= John Boyle (artist) =

Canadian painter (born 1941)

John B. Boyle
- Born: John Bernard Boyle; 23 September 1941 (age 84); London, Ontario, Canada
- Education: Self-taught
- Known for: Painter, activist, curator and writer
- Movement: London Regionalism
- Awards: Canada Council Grants in 1971, 1973 and 1979, and 1987
- Elected: member in 1975, Royal Canadian Academy of Arts

John B. Boyle RCA (born 23 September 1941) is a Canadian painter known for his use of subjects drawn from his own specific life experience and from Canadian history. He was a part of the London Regional art movement. The National Gallery of Canada considers Boyle's paintings are "firmly within the realm of the Canadian response to the 1960s-era Pop phenomenon".

== Biography ==
Boyle lived most of his life in London, Ontario. He was educated at the Ontario Teachers’ College in London, as well as the University of Western Ontario, and is self-taught as a painter. He taught elementary school in St. Catharines, Ontario, between 1962 and 1968. In 1974, he moved with his family to a converted church in Elsinore, Ontario (a small community near Owen Sound), where he had his home and studio until 2002, when he moved to Peterborough, Ontario.

Boyle began to paint in 1960 and was confirmed in his decision to become a painter by seeing a show circulated by the Stedelijk Museum in Amsterdam of Vincent van Gogh at the Detroit Institute of Arts, in 1962. He learned how to paint from a how-to-paint book. In 1964, the year he met Jack Chambers and Greg Curnoe, he began to exhibit. In 1966, controversy arose at Museum London over Boyle's exhibited piece in the 27th Annual Juried Western Ontario Exhibition, Seated Nude (now in Museum London, London, Ontario).

In 1968, he gave up teaching and became a full-time artist. His work came to favorable critical notice in the show, Heart of London, curated by Pierre Théberge for the National Gallery of Canada, 1968. The Heart of London exhibition, which featured other local artists including Jack Chambers, Greg Curnoe, and Murray Favro, brought the London Regionalism art movement to national attention.

Boyle was honoured when a detail of Tom Thomson from Boyle's painting Midnight Oil, Ode to Tom Thomson (1968, Museum London) - Thomson was one of Boyle's heroes - was used as the cover of Barry Lord's "The History of Painting in Canada" as well as the full picture on the back (NC Press, 1974). (It was the second book featuring a more-or-less complete record of Canadian art history after Russell Harper's 1966 'Painting in Canada - A History".) In 1978, an article in the Montreal Gazette described Boyle as "one of that influential handful of Southwestern Ontario artists which includes Greg Curnoe and Jack Chambers... whose work is characterized by their profound attachment to their local – and by extension – Canadian environment."

Boyle was a participant in London's 20/20 Gallery, an early cooperative founded in London, Ontario which continued until 1971. In 1972, he designed sets for the play Buffalo Jump by Carol Bolt at Theatre Passe Muraille, Toronto; that same year he curated the first Billboard Show in St. Catharines. In 1980, Boyle completed the enamelled steel mural Our Nell for the Queen station of the Toronto subway, depicting Nellie McClung, William Lyon Mackenzie, as well as the former Simpson's and Eaton's department stores. From 1973 through the 1990s, Boyle exhibited regularly at Nancy Poole's Studio in Toronto, a commercial gallery. In 2005, he was included in The Sixties in Canada, curated by Denise Leclerc and Pierre Dessureault for the National Gallery of Canada, Ottawa. He is represented by Loch Gallery, Toronto.

His illustration and book design work includes The Port Dalhousie Stories by Dennis Tourbin (1987), as well as several magazine articles and book jackets. Boyle also has published a novel, No Angel Came (Tellem Press, 1995) and has been since 1965 a founding member and principal kazooist of the Nihilist Spasm Band.

In 1970, he served as the first president of the Niagara Artist's Cooperative, now the Niagara Artists Centre, then, in 1971, became the founding spokesperson of Canadian Artists' Representation Ontario. Boyle was a member of the Royal Canadian Academy of Arts and served on the board of the Niagara Artists’ Company, the Canada Council Arts Advisory Panel, and the Canadian Conference of the Arts (shut-down in 2012). He was a member of the Board of Trustees of the Art Gallery of Ontario, 1975–1977. His papers are in The Edward P. Taylor Library & Archives of the Art Gallery of Ontario in Toronto, John Boyle Fonds CA OTAG SC093.

== Public collections ==
- Art Gallery of Hamilton, Ontario;
- Art Gallery of Ontario, Toronto;
- Art Gallery of Peterborough, Ontario;
- Beaverbrook Art Gallery, Fredericton, New Brunswick;
- Confederation Centre Art Gallery, Prince Edward Island;
- McMichael Canadian Art Collection, Kleinburg;
- Montreal Museum of Fine Arts;
- Museum London, Ontario;
- National Gallery of Canada, Ottawa;
