= Tom Benner =

Canadian artist (1950–2022)

- Born: Thomas Earl Benner; January 5, 1950; London, Ontario, Canada
- Died: September 21, 2022 (aged 72); London, Ontario, Canada
- Education: Special arts diploma from the Beal art program at H. B. Beal Secondary School, London, Ontario in 1969. Studied with Herb Ariss, Tom Coulter and Liz Biesiot
- Known for: Large-scale sculptor, painter, installation artist
- Spouse: Pauline McHenry (m. 1992)

Thomas Earl Benner (January 5, 1950 – September 21, 2022) was a Canadian sculptor of large sculptures, a painter and an installation artist who explored such themes as the environment, history and nature. His work was widely exhibited in Canada and the United States in public galleries and even in unconventional places, such as Union Station in Toronto. He is associated with a movement in Canadian art known as London Regionalism, which took place in the city of London, Ontario, where he was born and lived.

== Early years ==
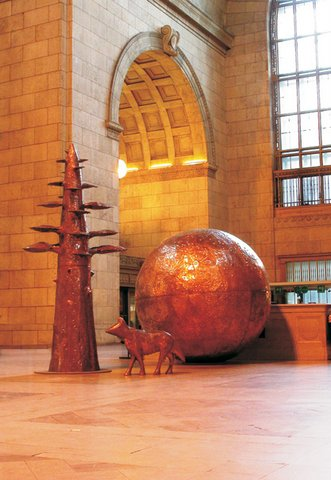
A Landscape (2003–2004), consisting of three pieces, is pictured in a solo exhibit at Union Station, Toronto, Ontario, in 2008. Wood frame sheathed in copper and copper rivets.

Benner was born on January 5, 1950, in London, Ontario. He received a special arts diploma from the Beal art program at H. B. Beal Secondary School, London, Ontario in 1969, studying with Herb Ariss, Tom Coulter and Liz Biesiot. From 1970–1974, together with Murray Favro and others, he was a member of a group of young artists working as sculptors centred on Don Bonham and known as The Herman Goode Aesthetic Racing Team (The A.R.T.). Theirs was an art of invention, a way to make the viewer consider the work of art as a part of the world around them. Benner took from the group a conviction about what constitutes an art object and the manner of its presentation. In time, his work would transform history itself into an imagined landscape.

== Career ==
Benner's first shows concerned nature's products such as leaves and fibreglass sculptures of rocks and boulders. In 1977, Sir George Williams Art Galleries in Montreal hosted an exhibition of works by Benner and his artist brother, Ron Benner. In 1983, he created his first environmentally-oriented work, Hanging Fin (Whale). For this installation, he created a hanging whale made of metal and hardware, which he suspended from the ceiling by a rope. He set on the wall behind the hanging whale a painting of the whale's mother and baby. It was the first of his installations dedicated to memory and loss, a signature work that marked the beginning of his prolific production of memorial sculptures of endangered and extinct wildlife. He created it in response to his feeling that there was a lack of animal symbolism in Western culture so, as an artist, as he said, it was his job to put that in.

Benner's 1986 exhibition, titled A Response, consisted of large-scale sculptures and linocut prints that depicted threatened or extinct wildlife, such as the fin whale, polar bear, sea eagle, puma, white rhinoceros and the great auk. It embodied extensive research on Benner's part about the meanings of animals and nature symbols to older civilizations. A particular highlight was the surreal installation of White Rhino (1986), a full-scale aluminum-clad sculpture of a rhinoceros now on the front lawn of Museum London.

In his 1996 show titled Tecumseh, at Museum London, Benner also brought to light little-known or lost histories of Aboriginal identities in the Canadian narrative, such as Tribute to Nahneebahweequay (1988) and Tecumseh (1993). A year later, he exhibited his full-size 600-pound copper Bison in Union Station in Toronto and then toured it in 1998 in his show, Tour of Bison.

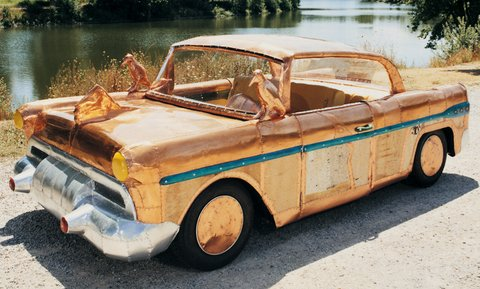
Pontiac is one of three automobiles (2000–2002) in Benner's solo show, Cruising the Margins, that travelled across Canada and the U.S. from 2002 to 2007. Wood frame, hand-carved wood, steel, copper, aluminium, birch bark, deerskin, ceramic, paint.

In 2002, Catherine Elliot Shaw for the McIntosh Gallery in London, Ontario, curated Cruising the Margins, Benner's "auto" show, composed of three full-size classic cars made by Benner which travelled to nine galleries across Canada and the United States. That same year, Benner began an eight-foot in diameter, 13-foot-high sphere Moon. He wanted to build pieces that were sculptures in simple, dramatic forms in the medium of copper. The Moon became the core for A Landscape, a show in 2008. He added the Red Pine and the Coyote, resulting in a work that reflected the landscape paintings he grew up with, represented by Tom Thomson and the Group of Seven, and those made by his friends Roly Fenwick and Paterson Ewen.

Museum London held a major travelling retrospective exhibition, Call of the Wild, in 2010. It covered 20 years of his work and ultimately travelled to eight galleries across Canada. Some viewers thought the show seemed like the remnants of a storybook world but even museum professionals found its scale, which required major gallery space, "quite impressive". In 2016, the Michael Gibson Gallery in London, Ontario, showed his exhibition Ice Formations with a monumental sculpture, watercolours and what Benner calls "cased shrines" honouring marine animals. His last works were a life-sized Polar Bear and an oversized Sandhill Crane, both in a private art collection.

== Public collections ==
- Art Gallery of Algoma, Sault Ste. Marie
- Art Gallery of Guelph
- Art Gallery of Mississauga
- Art Gallery of Ontario, Toronto
- Art Gallery of Windsor
- Canada Council Art Bank, Ottawa
- Confederation Centre Art Gallery, Charlottetown, Prince Edward Island
- McIntosh Gallery, The University of Western Ontario, London, Ontario
- Museum London, Ontario
- Tom Thomson Gallery, Owen Sound, Ontario

Benner also has permanent installations of outdoor sculpture including the White Rhino at Museum London, Rookery of Herons at Norfolk Arts Centre (Simcoe), The Ancient Ones at the Woodstock Art Gallery and Turkey Vultures at the D. B. Weldon Library, Western University, London, Ontario.

== Personal life ==
Benner died on September 21, 2022, in London, Ontario. He was 72 years old.
