= Canadian pavilion =

Venice Biennale national pavilion

Coordinates: 45.4276°N 12.3584°E

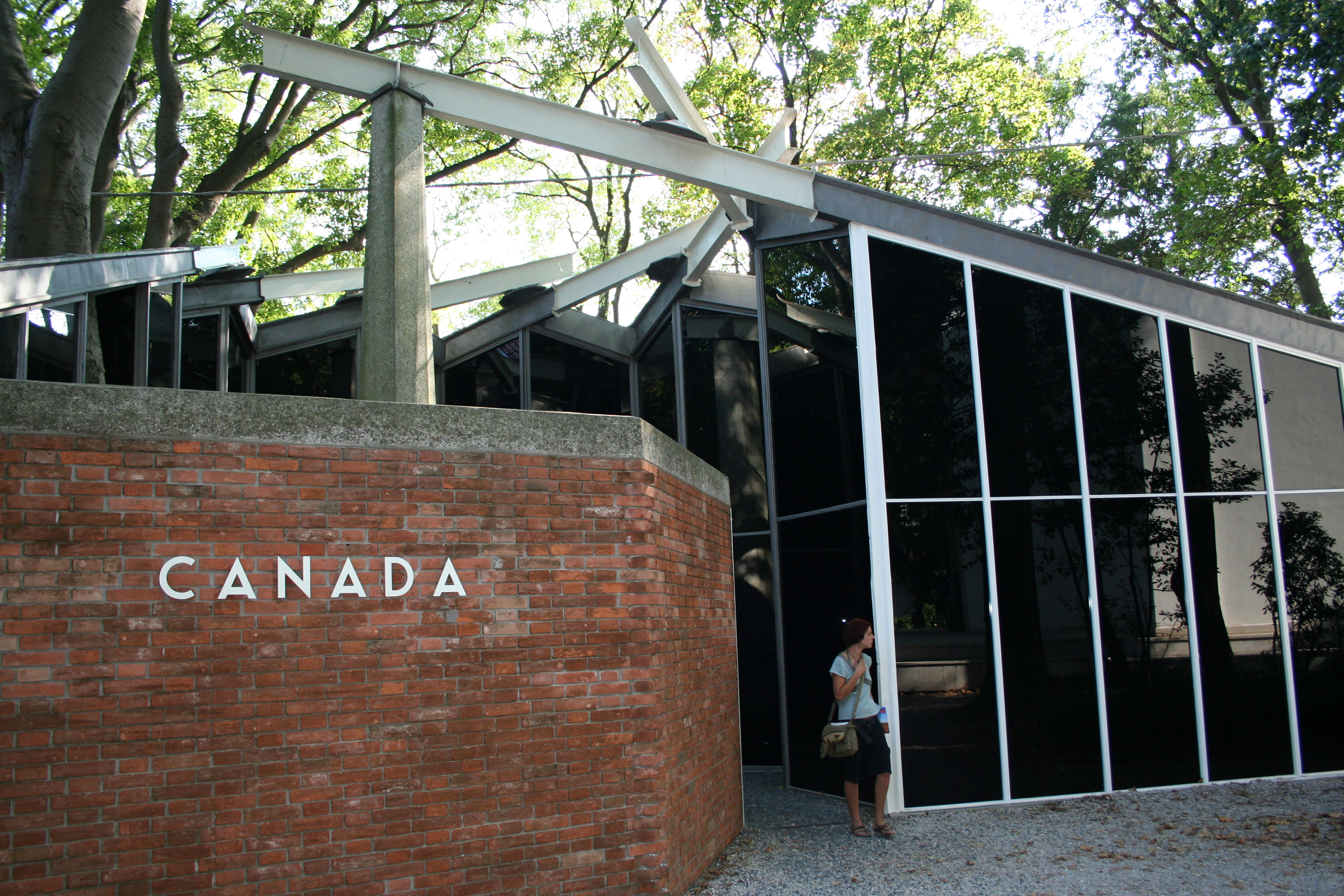
Biennale art 2009 Pavilion Canada

The Canadian pavilion houses Canada's national representation during the Venice Biennale arts festivals.

== Background ==
The Venice Biennale is an international art biennial exhibition held in Venice, Italy. Often described as "the Olympics of the art world", participation in the Biennale is a prestigious event for contemporary artists. The festival has become a constellation of shows: a central exhibition curated by that year's artistic director, national pavilions hosted by individual nations, and independent exhibitions held throughout Venice. The Biennale's parent organisation also runs regular festivals in other arts: architecture, dance, film, music and theatre.

Outside the central international exhibition, individual nations produce their own shows, known as pavilions, as their national representation. Nations that own their pavilion buildings – such as the 30 housed in the Giardini – are responsible for their own upkeep and construction costs as well. Nations without dedicated buildings create pavilions in venues throughout the city.

== Organization and building ==
The Canadian pavilion was designed by the Italian architects BBPR and erected between 1956 and 1957. Its architecture is more modern and thereby distinct than the nearby pavilions. Inside, its rooms unfold in a spiral of open and closed spaces.

The nation has been participating in the international exhibition since 1952. The National Gallery of Canada took over the Venice selection process from the Canada Council for the Arts in 2010.

== Representation by year ==
Since 1952 Canada has been represented at every Venice Biennale.

- 1952 — Emily Carr, David Milne, Goodridge Roberts, Alfred Pellan
- 1954 — B C Binning, Paul-Émile Borduas, Jean-Paul Riopelle
- 1956 — Jack Shadbolt, Louis Archambault, Harold Town
- 1958 — James Wilson Morrice, Jacques de Tonnancour, Anne Kahane, Jack Nichols
- 1960 — Edmund Alleyn, Graham Coughtry, Jean Paul Lemieux, Frances Loring, Albert Dumouchel
- 1962 — Jean-Paul Riopelle
- 1964 — Harold Town, Elza Mayhew
- 1966 — Alex Colville, Yves Gaucher, Sorel Etrog
- 1968 — Ulysse Comtois, Guido Molinari
- 1970 — Michael Snow
- 1972 — Gershon Iskowitz, Walter Redinger
- 1976 — Greg Curnoe
- 1978 — Ron Martin, Henry Saxe
- 1980 — Collin Campbell, Pierre Falardeau & Julien Poulin, General Idea, Tom Sherman, Lisa Steele
- 1982 — Paterson Ewen
- 1984 — Ian Carr-Harris, Liz Magor
- 1986 — Melvin Charney, Krzysztof Wodiczko
- 1988 — Roland Brener, Michel Goulet
- 1990 — Geneviève Cadieux
- 1993 — Robin Collyer
- 1995 — Edward Poitras (curator: Gerald McMaster)
- 1997 — Rodney Graham (curator: Loretta Yarlow)
- 1999 — Tom Dean
- 2001 — Janet Cardiff & George Bures Miller (Curator: Scott Watson)
- 2003 — Jana Sterbak
- 2005 — Rebecca Belmore (curators: Jann LM Bailey and Scott Watson)
- 2007 — David Altmejd (curator: Louise Déry)
- 2009 — Mark Lewis (curator: Barbara Fischer)
- 2011 — Steven Shearer (curator: Josée Drouin-Brisebois)
- 2013 — Shary Boyle (curator: Josée Drouin-Brisebois)
- 2015 — BGL (curator: Marie Fraser)
- 2017 — Geoffrey Farmer (curator: Kitty Scott)
- 2019 — Isuma (curators: Asinnajaq, executive director and chief curator of the Art Gallery of Alberta Catherine Crowston, senior curator of contemporary art at the National Gallery of Canada Josée Drouin-Brisebois, executive director and chief curator Art Museum at the University of Toronto Barbara Fischer and independent curator and writer Candice Hopkins.
- 2022 — Stan Douglas (curator: Reid Shier)
- 2024 — Kapwani Kiwanga (curator: Gaëtane Verna)
- 2026 — Abbas Akhavan (curator: Kim Nguyen)

== Bibliography ==
- Russeth, Andrew (April 17, 2019). "The Venice Biennale: Everything You Could Ever Want to Know". ARTnews. Archived from the original on April 20, 2019.
- Volpi, Cristiana (2013). "Canada". In Re Rebaudengo, Adele (ed.). Pavilions and Garden of Venice Biennale. Rome: Contrasto. p. 189. ISBN 978-88-6965-440-4.
