= Ron Martin (artist) =

Canadian painter (born 1943)

- Born: Ronald Albert Martin; April 28, 1943 (age 82); London, Ontario, Canada
- Known for: painter
- Awards: Governor General's Award in Visual and Media Arts (2012)

Ron Martin (born 1943) is a Canadian abstract painter. His way of generating his paintings by conceptually defined strategies differs from modernist abstraction, which seeks to enhance an artist's special aesthetic genius and craft skills. Martin works in series.

He is associated with a movement in Canadian art known as London Regionalism, which took place in the city of London, Ontario where he was born and grew up. Led by individuals such as Jack Chambers, the city was the home of the founding of Canadian Artists' Representation in 1968. Other artists who lived in the city included Murray Favro.

== Biography ==
Martin was born and raised in London, Ontario, where he attended H.B. Beal Secondary School. He shared his first studio with Murray Favro in 1964. His early work was influenced by Greg Curnoe, not only by Curnoe's work but by Curnoe's interest in Marcel Duchamp and Kurt Schwitters.

Martin had his first solo show at the Pollock Gallery in Toronto in 1966 at a time when he was influenced by Curnoe. His particular approach to art-making was apparent in 1967 when he began painting his series Conclusions and Transfers. Acting on a suggestion of Duchamp, Martin's series showed the painting itself and an exact duplicate, hung next to each other.

Martin's theory-oriented approach continued in the series that followed: World Paintings, in which he divided canvases of fixed size into one-inch squares and filled the squares with paint shaped like an N. Martin showed these paintings at Carmen Lamanna Gallery in 1971.

In 1973, the National Gallery of Canada included Martin as one of six artists in the exhibition Boucherville Montreal Toronto London curated by Brydon Smith and Pierre Théberge. Martin exhibited 14 paintings, part of a series of 24 Bright Red paintings made in 1972. Martin was quoted as saying "I have to do what I'm doing".

From 1974 to 1981, Martin painted the series Black Paintings, which was followed by much sparer grid works, the Geometric Paintings (1981–85), and then by the more painterly Black, White and Grey Paintings. In the 1990s he created a number of series based on a configuration of circles.

Martin has had numerous solo shows and been included in group exhibitions across Canada, in New York, Germany, Japan and France. He was included in a number of major exhibitions including biennials and group exhibitions at the National Gallery of Canada and the Art Gallery of Ontario. His work is represented in numerous public and private collections, such as the National Gallery of Canada, Ottawa; the Art Gallery of Ontario, Toronto; the Vancouver Art Gallery (which displayed the Martin work in its collection in the permanent collection installation Repeated Gesture [1997–1998]) and Museum London. In 1978, along with Henry Saxe, his work represented Canada at the Venice Biennale. In 1979, he was awarded the Canada Council's Victor Martyn Lynch-Staunton Award. In 2012, Ron Martin was awarded a Governor General's Award in Visual and Media Arts. He is represented by Michael Gibson Gallery in London, Ontario.

== Bibliography ==
- Nasgaard, Roald (2008). Abstract Painting in Canada. Douglas & McIntyre. p. 249. ISBN 9781553653943.
