= Wyn Geleynse =

Canadian artist (born 1947)

- Born: 1947; Rotterdam, The Netherlands
- Education: H.B. Beal Secondary School, London, Ontario (1963–1966)
- Known for: multimedia installation artist

Wyn Geleynse (born 1947) is a pioneer film and video projection artist whose career spans a period of over 40 years.

== Career ==
Wyn Geleynse was born in Rotterdam, The Netherlands, and he and his parents emigrated from Rotterdam to London, Ontario, in 1953. The so-called "London Regional School" in art had an impact on Geleynse's development as an artist, especially Greg Curnoe and Murray Favro and influenced him in making art from his everyday surroundings. He studied at H.B. Beal Secondary School, London, Ontario in the arts program (1963–1966). He at first made drawings, then became a printmaker - he studied lithography in 1972 – then a painter. In 1979, he became involved with film and video. During his long career, he has been a lecturer at the University of Western Ontario's Visual Art Department and a visiting artist at many schools, museums and galleries in Europe and Canada.

== Work ==
In 1979, Geleynse combined an interest in model-making with photography. Since 1981, the artist has integrated film into this process, creating installation-based works in which short films loops are projected against or as part of a host of fabricated items and with people, often himself, in the films, accompanied by his ironic comments. To these works, he applies custom film loopers, viewfinders and other objects to transform the viewer's reception of the image. He often uses biographical footage, and his work speaks about matters such as self-identity, male sexuality, powerlessness and haplessness. For haplessness, he uses himself in his films. As he said:

"I think I can be hapless better than most people".

He also constructs models of trucks and imaginary buildings such as Warehouse (1993–2015) or Shelter (2020) and combines them with film loops and audio recordings as well as projecting images on buildings.

== Exhibitions ==
Since 1969, when he began to show his work in solo shows, he has exhibited extensively in Canada and Europe. In 1976 and 1981, he had solo shows at the Forest City Gallery, London, then in 1986, in New York at the Artist's Space and in Mercer Union in Toronto and in 1989, at the Art Gallery of Windsor and Art Gallery of Hamilton. In the early 1990s, he had solo shows mainly in the United States, then in the mid-1990s and till 2008, abroad in Holland and France. In 1997, he had a solo exhibition titled Wyn Geleynse: projections at the Centre d'Art Contemporain de Basse-Normandie in Hérouville Saint-Clair. In 2003, he had a solo exhibition at the Centre culturel canadien in Paris. In 2005, his show A Man Trying to Explain Pictures, was organized by Museum London, London, Ontario. In 2020, he built a large model titled Shelter for a show at TrepanierBaer Gallery in Calgary, Alberta, Canada, which represents him. He also has been represented in a large number of group shows in Canada, the U.S. and Europe over many decades. In 2022, his work was included in Everywhere We Are, a show co-organized by Contemporary Calgary and Nickle Galleries featuring works by Vikky Alexander, Chris Cran, Geoffrey Farmer, Liz Magor, and Ron Moppett and other artists who helped shape contemporary art in Canada.

== Commissions ==
Since 1987, he has projected film on buildings in Canada and Europe and participated in shows on projections, solo or group. In 2009, he was commissioned to create a film projection on the building that would house the new Art Gallery of Peel in Brampton titled Wyn Geleynse: The Peel Projection.

== Selected public collections ==
His work is in such public collections as Art Windsor-Essex; the Musée d'art contemporain de Montréal; Museum London; the National Gallery of Canada; the Remai Modern and elsewhere.

== Awards ==
In 2018, Geleynse received a Governor General's Award in Visual and Media Arts.
