= Paterson Ewen =

Canadian painter (1925–2002)

Paterson Ewen RCA
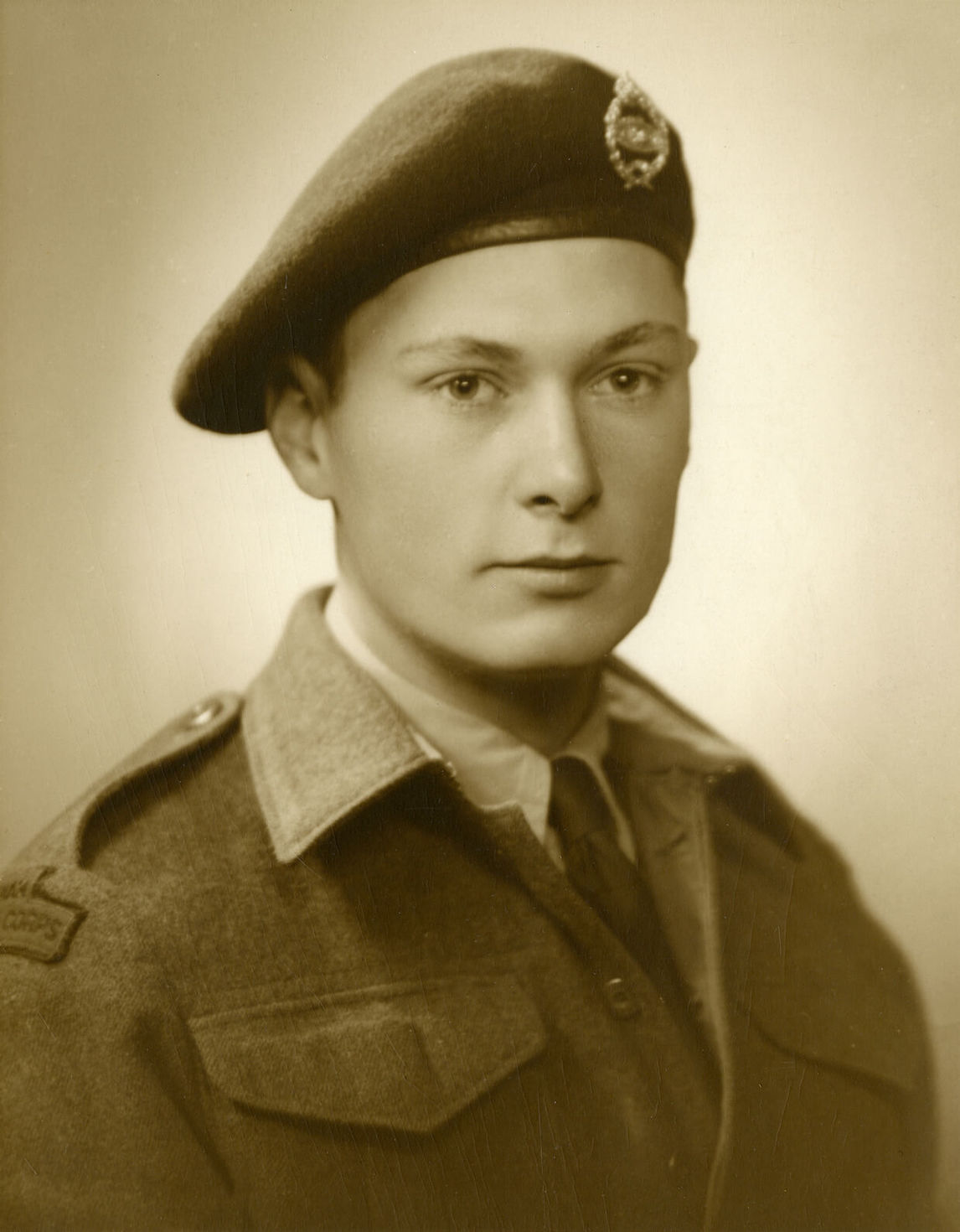
- Ewen in his army uniform, c. 1944
- Born: April 7, 1925; Montreal, Quebec, Canada
- Died: February 17, 2002 (aged 76); London, Ontario, Canada
- Education: Montreal Museum School of Fine Art and Design
- Spouses: Françoise Sullivan (m. 1949–1965); Mary Handford (m. 1979)

Paterson Ewen RCA (April 7, 1925 – February 17, 2002) was a Canadian painter. He was a founding member of The Non-Figurative Artists' Association of Montreal, along with Claude Tousignant, Jean-Paul Mousseau, Guido Molinari, and Marcel Barbeau. He moved to London, Ontario in the late 1960s where London Regionalism was championed by Jack Chambers and Greg Curnoe. It was in London that Ewen developed the gouged-plywood style that would become his hallmark.

== Biography ==
William Paterson Ewen was born in 1925 in Montreal, Quebec. Interested in art from a young age, he began by sculpting small figures in wax, and at thirteen petitioned his mother to hang art on the previously unadorned walls of the Ewen residence. Beginning in 1944, Ewen served in a reconnaissance regiment on the Western Front (World War II), but was not involved in active combat. Upon his return to Canada, he enrolled in McGill University. He studied geology, but after his first year he began to struggle with depression, and sought relief in copying magazine covers and sketching the landscape around Canadian Officers' Training Corps at Saint-Gabriel-de-Valcartier where he had re-enlisted for the summer. When he returned to school in the fall, Ewen signed up for a figure-drawing course taught by John Goodwin Lyman. The experience was, as Ewen recalls it, unpleasant. The next year he transferred to the School of Art and Design at the Montreal Museum of Fine Arts, where he studied with Goodridge Roberts, Arthur Lismer, Moses Reinblatt, and Jacques de Tonnancour. Ewen sometimes recalled this period, caught up in Goodridge's orbit and the "sympathetic atmosphere," of the program, as "the happiest days of [his] life.

In 1949, he married dancer Françoise Sullivan, with whom he had four sons. Sullivan was a member of Les Automatistes, and Ewen would often attend Automatiste events and take part in the conversations which were enriching for him. Ewen's graduation that same year marked the end of his veteran's allowance, and so he went to work, first making hats, then selling rugs at Ogilvy's. He eventually found a position with Sullivan's father as an assistant secretary to the chief administrator at the municipal rent control board, where he remained until taking an employment supervisor position at Bathurst Containers in 1956.

When Sullivan and Ewen separated in 1966, Ewen again grappled with depression. In 1968, he moved to Kitchener, Ontario, to stay with his sister Marjorie Margesson. He then went to Westminster Veteran's Hospital in London, Ontario. Ewen felt that the treatment he received was helpful and that it restored him to "a state of good physical and mental health," though he continued to struggle with his mental health and his relationship to alcohol. He went on to teach at H. B. Beal Secondary School until he was awarded a Canada Council grant in 1971. The grant allowed him to take a studio in Toronto, and this is where he developed his signature style, gouging landscapes out of massive plywood sheets with an electric router. When Ewen returned to Toronto, his Beal Secondary job had gone to someone else, but there was an opening at the University of Western Ontario. Ewen became a full professor at UWO. This is where he met Mary Alison Handford in 1979. They married in 1995.

== Career ==
Ewen's career began with explorations of the landscape.The influence of James Wilson Morrice, and his professor Goodridge Roberts can be seen in Ewen's early works, completed while he was still attending the School of Art and Design. During this period Ewen was, in his own words, "a pretty straightforward figurative painter influenced by the Post-Impressionists." This began to change around 1949, when Françoise Sullivan's influence and the Automatiste milieu pushed Ewen towards abstraction.

This tension between surface and figurative form can be seen in paintings like Interior, Fort Street, Montréal [#1] (1951). Ewen showed very little until 1955, when he began exhibiting abstract works. This new way of painting balanced the psychic automatism of les Automatistes with the rising star of hard-edged geometric Plasticiens like Molinari and Tousignant, both of whom Ewen shared a studio with in the mid-1960s. During this period, Ewen was also influenced by Camilla Gray's work on Russian Constructivism, the monochromes of Paul-Émile Borduas, and the work of Northwest Coast artists on display at the Royal Ontario Museum.

In 1971, Ewen moved to London, and there found inspiration in the growing London Regionalism movement, which emphasized specificity of place and time. Once again, Ewen's methods changed dramatically, rejecting abstraction in favour of dynamic, figurative "phenomscapes." This way of looking at landscape allowed Ewen to revisit his boyhood interests in geology and space. The new pieces were physically large, often using two or three 4' x 8' sheets of plywood scarfed together. Ewen used a router to tear into the surface, sometimes re-attaching objects to the plane with hardware. These shallow topographies were then painted with huge, rolling forces, gestures towards what Roald Nasgaard called "a strategy to make landscape painting vital again." Ewen described this way of working as cathartic:

I enjoyed the physicality of it, particularly after the meticulousness of the hard-edge painting. It was like a kind of therapy. I may not have felt the tension and anger pouring out of me when I did it, but it felt awfully good afterwards.

These were the works that solidified Ewen's place in the annals of Canadian art. He worked on many series in this mode, returning again, and again to the ever-changing natural world. No subject is more integral to an understanding Ewen's work, and perhaps Ewen himself, than the moon, whose phases he painted endlessly.

== Selected exhibitions ==
- 1969: four group exhibitions and first solo at the Carmen Lamanna Gallery, Toronto
- 1976: Retrospective, Museum London, London, Ontario
- 1982: Venice Biennale curated by Jessica Bradley
- 1996: Art Gallery of Ontario, Toronto: Ewen: Earthly Weathers, Heavenly Skies (major retrospective)
- 2000: Palazzo Grassi, Venice: Cosmos: From Goya to De Chirico, From Friedrich to Kiefer

== Selected collections ==
- National Gallery of Canada, Ottawa
- Art Gallery of Ontario, Toronto
- Musée d'art contemporain de Montréal
- Montreal Museum of Fine Arts
- Museum of Contemporary Canadian Art, Toronto
- MIT List Visual Artistiiscis centres of the west
- . Jackson-Triggs Winery, Niagara On The Lake.

== Selected publications ==
- Hatch, John G. Paterson Ewen: Life & Work. Toronto: Art Canada Institute, 2018. ISBN 978-1-4871-0158-9
- Paterson Ewen: Biennale di Venezia [exhibition catalogue]. 1982.
- Teitelbaum, Matthew. Paterson Ewen: The Montreal Years. Saskatoon: Mendel Art Gallery, 1988.
- Teitelbaum, Matthew (ed.). Paterson Ewen. Toronto: Art Gallery of Ontario, 1996.

== Honours ==
- Prix des Laurentides, 1957
- numerous Canada Council awards and fellowships
- Royal Canadian Academy of Arts, 1975
- Victor Martyn Lynch-Staunton Award, 1987
- Banff Centre School of Fine Arts National Award, 1987
- Toronto Arts Award for Visual Arts, 1988;
- Professor Emeritus, University of Western Ontario, London, Ontario, 1988
- D. Litt, University of Western Ontario, London, Ontario, 1989
- honorary LL.D, Concordia University, Montreal, Quebec, 1989
- Jean A Chalmers National Visual Arts Award, Ontario Arts Council 1995
