= Tony Urquhart =

Canadian painter (1934–2022)

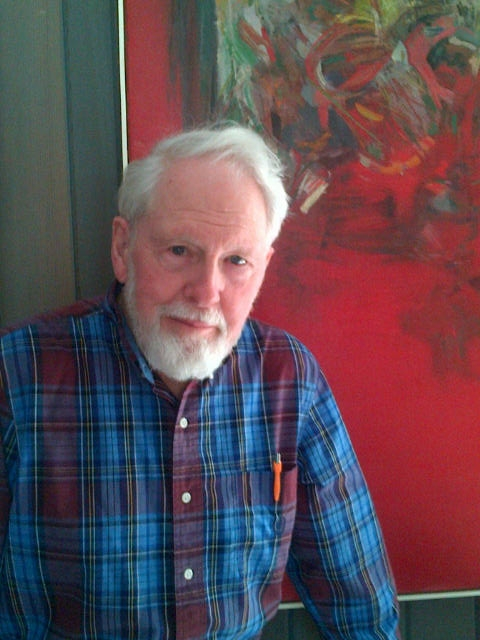
- Born: April 9, 1934; Niagara Falls, Ontario
- Died: January 26, 2022 (aged 87)
- Occupation: Artist
- Spouse: Jane Urquhart
- Children: Emily Urquhart
- Writing career
- Notable awards: Order of Canada, Governor General's Award in Visual and Media Arts, CARFAC Outstanding Contribution Award; degree of Doctor of Laws Carleton University, Ottawa
- Website: tonyurquhartartist.com

Anthony Morse Urquhart, CM RCA LL.D. (April 9, 1934 – January 26, 2022) was a Canadian painter. He was recognized in the late 1950s and early 1960s as one of Canada's pioneering abstractionists, having been variously linked with the Toronto painters associated with The Isaacs Gallery and The Heart of London group that included Jack Chambers, Greg Curnoe and Murray Favro.

Since the 1960s Urquhart has followed an independent and autonomous path in his art, centred upon his distinctive "box" format. In 1968, with Jack Chambers and Kim Ondaatje, he helped found Canadian Artists' Representation/Le Front des artistes Canadiens (CARFAC), the artists' 'union' that first established a fee schedule for public museum and gallery exhibitions of contemporary artists.

== Early life ==
"When I was a child," Urquhart says, "there were creative people in my family: a great aunt who painted pottery; my mother who did little watercolours under instruction at school and my father who was a photographer at one time, and serious about his work. But I never had a relative who was an artist per se. Actually, my grandmother was quite a strong influence throughout my life. She was an artist in the sense that she liked landscaping the grounds of our house, which were considerable, given the fact that we lived in the centre of the town of Niagara Falls on half an acre. She had ponds made; there was a wood; there was an old barn in the back of the house. It was like an oasis of quiet".

== Education ==
Between 1954 and 1958 Urquhart was trained at Yale University summer school (1955). He also attended the Albright Art School (1955) with Seymore Drumlevitch, a painter in Western New York; Larry Calcagno who showed with the Martha Jackson Gallery in New York; advertising design teacher Don Nicholls; and Robert Bruce, a Canadian who taught illustration. Afterwards, he attended the University at Buffalo, New York, graduating in 1958.

== Career ==
Urquhart began his career as a painter. Some of his earliest work includes landscapes such as Primavera, 1957. His association with Av Isaacs, the owner of the Isaacs Gallery (one of Toronto's most cutting-edge art venues which emerged in the mid-1950s). In 1956, Isaacs asked Urquhart to join his growing stable of artists, including Michael Snow, Joyce Weiland and Graham Coughtry. Urquhart had his first works shown at the Isaacs Gallery in Toronto when he was only 22. He also had a one-man show in January 1957 and a second in November of the same year with Isaacs. At the time, Urquhart's influence was from Buffalo, directly from the New York Abstract Expressionists and in 1956 the influence of this movement was still new to the Toronto public.

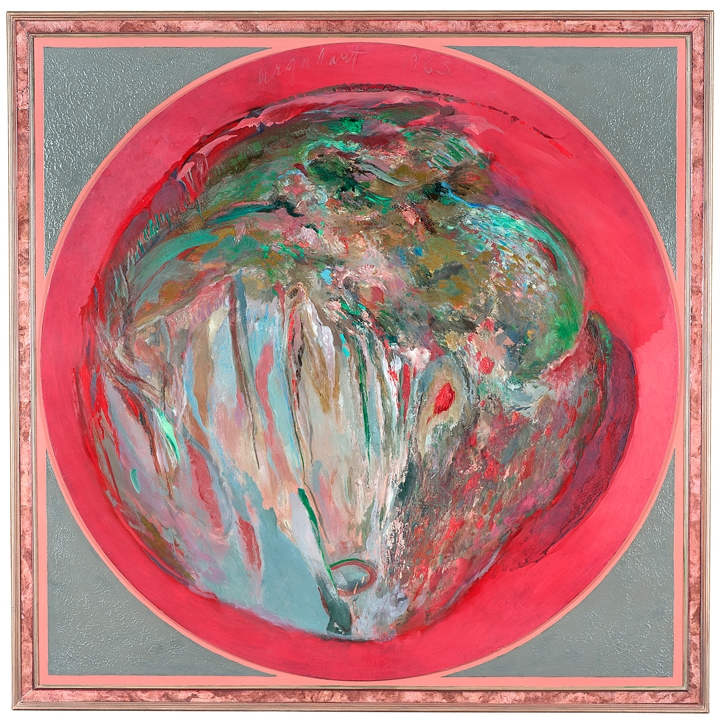
Object On a Red Ground. A painting by Canadian artist Tony Urquhart. 1965.

Urquhart lived in Niagara Falls until September 1960 when he went to London to be the first artist-in-residence at the University of Western Ontario. The university's McIntosh Art Gallery was the first university art gallery in Ontario, and opened in 1942, but it wasn't until Urquhart was appointed artist-in-residence that the gallery really took off. Essentially, Urquhart ran the place for four years starting in 1960, mounting approximately ten shows each year.

Urquhart was one of a handful of artists responsible for generating the excitement and community engagement that garnered national acclaim for the growing London art scene during the late 1960s. Having an artist at the centre of the McIntosh Gallery's curatorial operations was indicative of the broader regional trend towards empowered artists, culminating in 1968 with the formation of CARFAC. The organization successfully established a fee structure for public museum and gallery exhibitions of contemporary artists. Urquhart stayed at the University of Western Ontario in a teaching capacity until 1972 when he joined the faculty of Fine Arts at the University of Waterloo, where he remained for three decades, retiring in 1999.

Urquhart's first major retrospective, Reunion, was mounted by the London Regional Art Gallery in 1970, subsequent to which he began to serve widely on juries and, along with Jack Chambers, was consulted concerning the establishment of the Canada Council's Art Bank collection. Other retrospective exhibitions were presented at the Kitchener-Waterloo Gallery (1978) and the Art Gallery of Windsor (1988), both of which toured extensively from Newfoundland to British Columbia.

Urquhart also became involved in the literary scene. He collaborated with Gary Michael Dault on the making of Cells of Ourselves: Drawings by Tony Urquhart, as well as Off the Wall, a hundred and three idea-drawings for boxes with commentary by Michael Phillips. A similar book, Sketch Book, was published by The Isaacs Gallery, 1962.

He also worked on book illustration which put him in collaboration with such authors as his wife Jane, Michael Ondaatje, Rohinton Mistry, Matt Cohen Stuart MacKinnon and Louis Dudek. His work is found in the permanent collections of such public institutions as New York's Museum of Modern Art; the Victoria and Albert Museum in London; the Hirshhorn Museum and Sculpture Garden Collection of the Smithsonian Institution in Washington, D.C.; the Bibliothèque nationale de France in Paris; the Museo Civico in Lugano; and the Walker Art Center in Minneapolis.

== Influences ==
In 1958 Urquhart embarked on the first of what would become annual, if not more frequent, stays in Europe, attracted to what he called the "otherness" of the visual experiences there, especially the landscape, architecture and pilgrimage sites such as Lourdes and Vimy Ridge in France. Of particular influence were the prints and drawings of Goya in The Prado, Madrid.

Urquhart may have begun his career as a painter, but he later felt the need to prolong the time viewers spent looking at a work of art. During 1963 and 1964 Urquhart traveled in France and Spain, and he described what he found there:

I had been wanting more of a presence in my two-dimensional work and that year I saw much three-dimensional work, most of which was not "art," but nevertheless had the indefinable presence I sought. Such things as scarecrows in Spain or truck scales in France took on an excitement for me that many works in traditional galleries no longer had. I also did a lot of reading and thinking that year. The result was that I returned home as a "thing-maker".

Urquhart made a study of 19th and 20th century French cemeteries from Père Lachaise Cemetery in Paris to the hundreds of small country graveyards outside of humble villages throughout France. He had a collection of over 800 120 mm slides that he photographed of sites and cemetery artifacts (wreaths, wrought iron objects, etc.) which he often used as reference for his drawings, paintings and box sculptures.

== Box sculptures ==
In 1965 Urquhart began to make paintings on boxes, which required the viewer to move around to see the whole work. They were tiny cubes six inches high that did not open, and with landscapes painted on all sides. By 1967 some of them had grown to seven feet in height, and were essentially three-dimensional paintings.

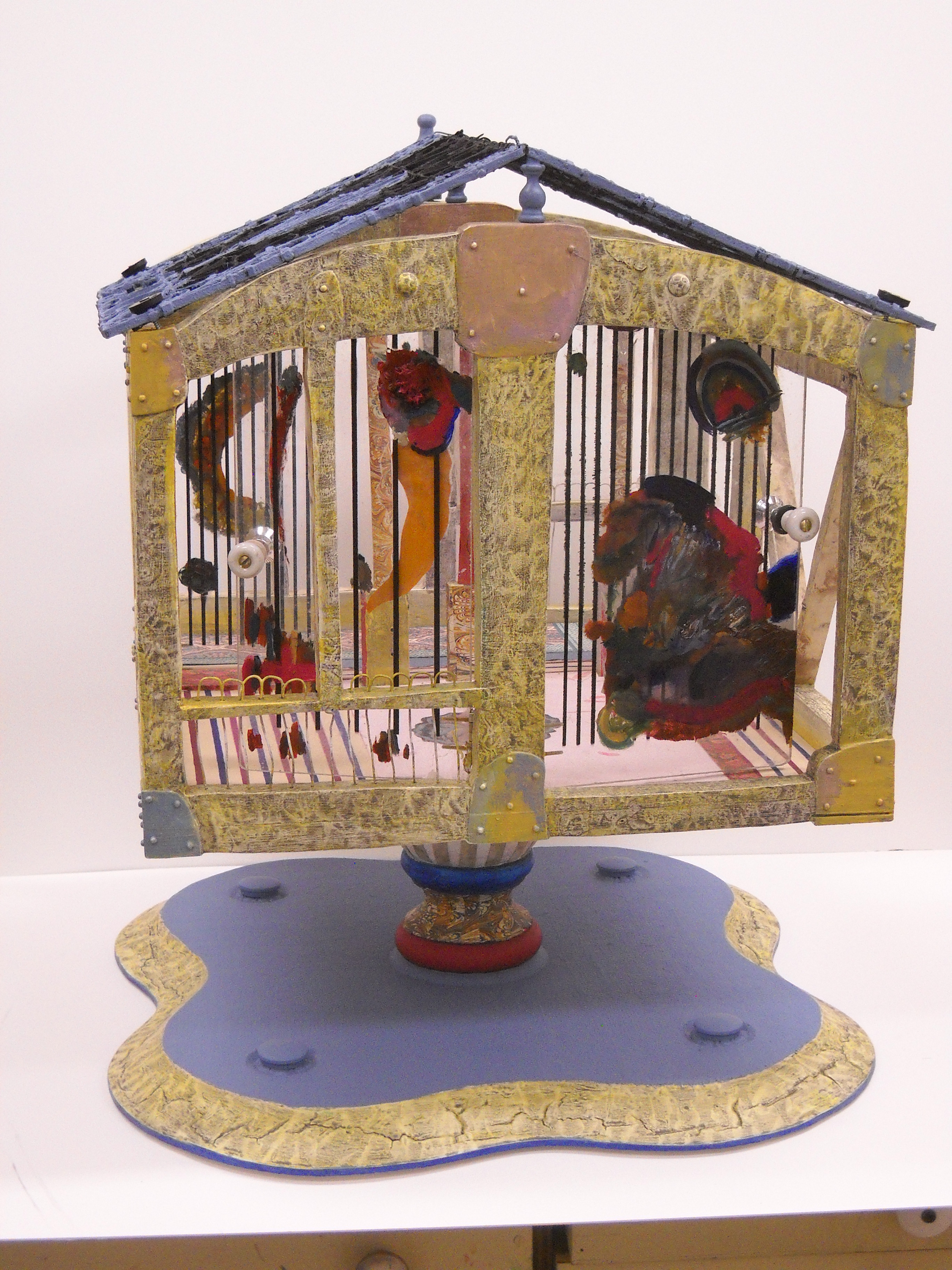
Pavillion. A box sculpture by Canadian artist Tony Urquhart. 2014.

Urquhart's first box was exhibited in 1965, a tiny 4 in × 5 in (100 mm × 130 mm) construction called the Decadent Cube. As Dorothy Cameron pointed out, its opening was just a mere "maddening" slit, but it was, nevertheless, "the first box to directly indicate an interior." She interpreted his later Box with Six Landscape Shards, 1970, as a metaphor for the destruction of natural landscape and as "the philosophic core of Urquhart's art." For Urquhart, however, three-dimensional form permitted the outward projection of his inner vision, of his imaginary landscape constructs; he insisted that "Every object I have ever made was just naturally meant to be painted" and continued to think of himself as a landscape painter.

In 1967 he went to Europe again. This time looking carefully at opening box-like objects: reliquaries, altar pieces, even a three-foot statue of the virgin with Christ-child on her lap, which, when opened, showed Christ on the cross. On his return he began to open boxes.

Urquhart's opening-box sculptures require not just the viewer's attention, but also the viewer's participation. Unlike conventional works of art, the boxes are meant to be handled – carefully – by gallery visitors. Made primarily of wood, and using a selection of found and invented materials that evoke memories or feelings from the past, or produce a reaction in the viewer, the boxes have hinged doors that give viewers access to interiors, along with Urquhart's brightly painted exteriors.

In Fourteen Rings, a box sculpture in the MacKenzie Art Gallery collection, Urquhart presents an opening-box with an intriguing title. What are the 14 rings? Where are they, and what do they mean? What happens if you touch them? With this exhibit, Urquhart reminds the viewer that exploring interior mysteries can be more rewarding than admiring familiar and predictable exteriors. By thinking about what's inside the box he is encouraging viewers to think outside the box.

== Honours and awards ==
Tony Urquhart was named to the Order of Canada in 1995. He was the winner of the 2009 Governor General's Award in Visual and Media Arts, and the CARFAC Outstanding Contribution Award. In 2016, he was given an LL.D. by Carleton University, Ottawa.

== Personal life ==
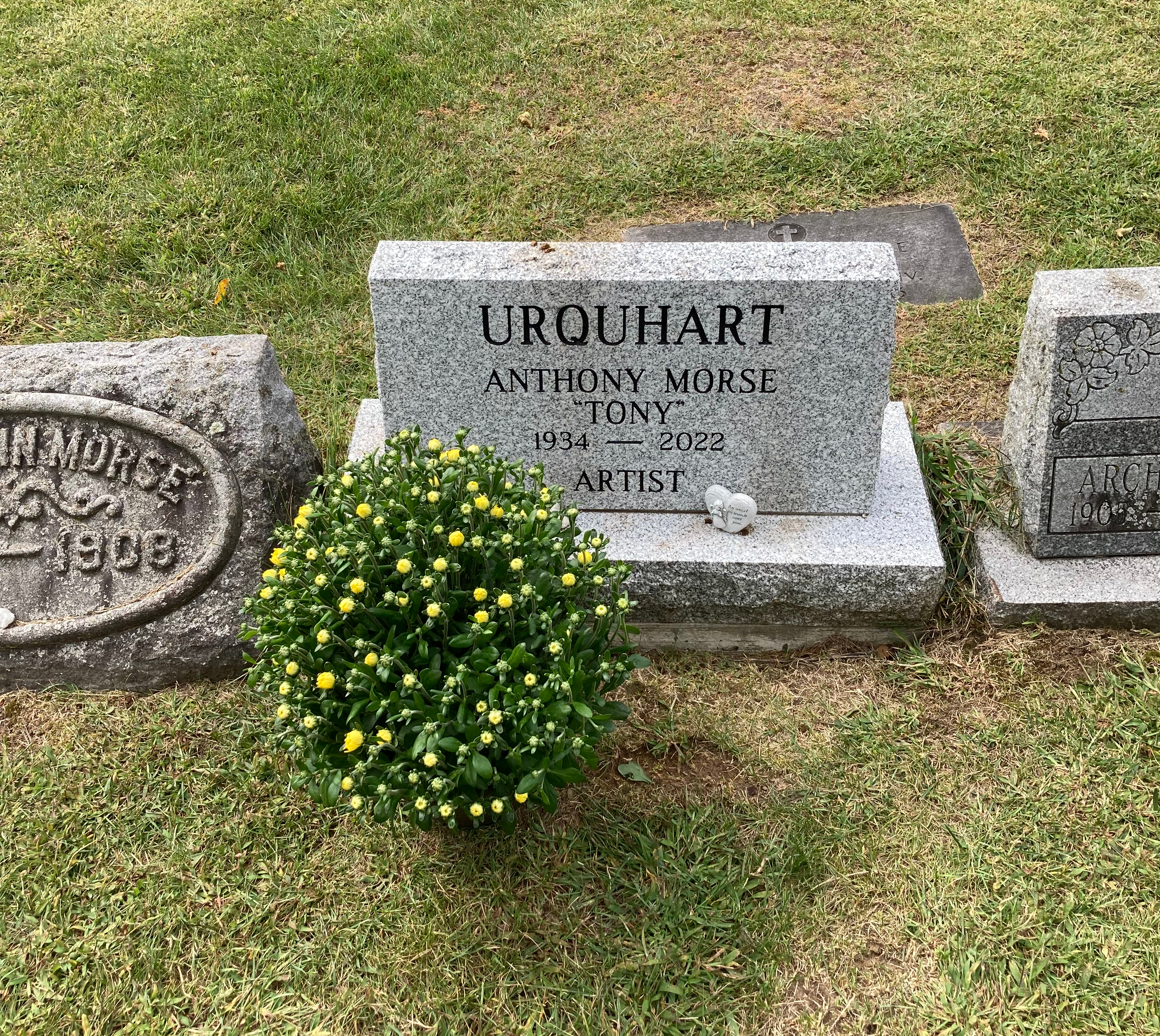
Urquhart's grave at Drummond Hill Cemetery

Urquhart's first marriage was in July 1958. The couple had four children together including two sons and two daughters. They later divorced. In 1976, Urquhart married the Canadian novelist and poet Jane Urquhart. Together, the couple had one daughter named Emily (born 1977), who became a nonfiction writer when she grew up. In 2020, she wrote a book about her father titled The Age of Creativity: Art, Memory, My Father, and Me (House of Anansi), which has been favorably reviewed as being not only one of the best accounts of her father's life but showing the resilience of the artist on facing old age.

He died from complications of a fall on January 26, 2022, at the age of 87. He was buried at Drummond Hill Cemetery in Niagara Falls, Ontario.
