= Pierre Théberge =

Canadian museum director and prolific curator (1942–2018)

- Born: August 9, 1942; Saint-Éleuthère, Quebec, Canada
- Died: October 5, 2018 (aged 76); Montreal, Quebec, Canada
- Education: B.A., M.A. University of Montreal; study at the Courtauld Institute of Art, London (1966)
- Known for: work on behalf of art in Canada
- Awards: Knight of the National Order of Quebec (1992); Officer of the Order of Canada (2001); Queen's Golden Jubilee Medal (2002); Royal Canadian Academy of Arts Medal (2005); Officer of the French Ordre des Arts et des Lettres (2008)

Pierre Théberge OC CQ (August 9, 1942 – October 5, 2018) was a museum director, curator and art historian, who was an advocate for Canadian art.

== Career ==
Théberge was born the seventh of nine children on August 9, 1942, in Saint-Éleuthère, Quebec. When he was a child, his family moved to Montreal, where in 1953, his older sister took him to the exhibition Five Centuries of Drawing at the Montreal Museum of Fine Arts. It was a turning-point. He became deeply interested in art.

After receiving his BA and MA in art history at the University of Montreal and further study at the Courtauld Institute of Art (1966), London, Théberge joined the National Gallery of Canada in 1966 as assistant curator of Canadian Art. He became curator of Contemporary Canadian Art in 1970 and curatorial administrator from 1972 to 1979.

At the National Gallery, he organized landmark exhibitions such as The Heart of London (1968), the first show to recognize the artists active in London, Ontario, among them Greg Curnoe. In 1969, for the N.E. Thing Co., he organized an exhibition titled Look [at the N.E. Thing Company]. In 1971, for Joyce Wieland, he organized the National Gallery's first solo show featuring a woman, with quilting and lipstick as art materials. In 1973, he and Brydon Smith co-curated Boucherville, Montreal, Toronto, London which introduced London Ontario artists Ron Martin and Murray Favro and others from Boucherville, Montreal and Toronto to the Canadian public. For Guido Molinari, he organized a retrospective and published his Writings on Art: 1954-1975 (both 1976). For Michael Snow, he organized a retrospective in 1978 with a major tour in Europe, making him the first Canadian artist to have a solo show at the Centre Georges Pompidou, in Paris. Théberge also was active in the purchase of their work as well as works by Ron Martin, Henry Saxe, Claude Tousignant, Charles Gagnon, Murray Favro and Gathie Falk, artists now the core of Canada's contemporary art establishment.

From 1979 to 1985, he served as chief curator at the Montreal Museum of Fine Arts. There, in 1980, he organized Tintin's Imaginary Museum, a first for Montreal, then in 1981 Greg Curnoe, a retrospective exhibition prepared for the National Gallery of Canada, and presented at the Montreal Museum. In the 1980s, he continued his commitment to Canadian art, co-curating shows such as Paul-Émile Borduas (1988) but he now began to assist curators in organizing shows such as Largillière and the Eighteenth-century Portrait (1981) with its loans from the Louvre, as well as co-curating populist shows which ranged widely over art history, with subjects from animated films (1982), to Pablo Picasso (1985). From 1986 to 1997, Théberge served as the director of the Montreal Museum. Between 1986 and 1991, Théberge and the Museum's Board oversaw the planning and construction of an ambitious new pavilion designed by Moshe Safdie, and launched a fund-raising campaign. In 1991, the opening of the new Jean-Noel Desmarais Pavilion more than doubled the space for the permanent collection and temporary exhibitions, as well as the Museum's technical services. At the same time, Théberge continued to co-curate exhibitions ranging from Leonardo da Vinci (1987), to Japanese art (1989), and even fashion Pierre Cardin (1991). In 1992, he organized the unorthodox show Snoopy the Masterpiece, devoted to the comic strip Peanuts.

In 1998, he was appointed director and CEO of the National Gallery of Canada, the first person in Canada to hold directorships of two major museums. As director of the National Gallery he hosted several major exhibitions including The Great Parade: Portrait of the Artist as Clown (2004) which he organized, The 1930s: The Making of The New Man (2008) featuring artists of the 20th century such as Pablo Picasso, Salvador Dalí, Alex Colville and Walker Evans. He also acquired Louise Bourgeois’s Maman, a 30-foot-tall sculpture, designed in 1999 and installed in 2005 on the plaza of the National Gallery, which became a landmark, as well as purchasing oversized, human sculptures by Ron Mueck, and Running Horses, 11 life-sized, neon-coloured steel horses by Joe Fafard. Under Théberge's directorship, the Gallery also increased its holdings of First Nations and Inuit art, as well as initiating shows in these areas, such as a retrospective of Norval Morrisseau (2006).

With his curators, from 2003 on, Théberge created a series of big summertime exhibitions in an old aluminum factory in Shawinigan, Quebec, including 2004's Noah’s Ark, which highlighted Ydessa Hendeles's Teddy Bear Project. And he secured a donation from Vancouver philanthropist Michael Audain that, in 2007, saw the creation of a dedicated position for an Indigenous curator at the National Gallery of Canada. However, his directorship came under increasing criticism from 2003 on for a wide range of reasons, among them his travel expenses, poor labour relations with staff; fighting within the gallery's management ranks; Théberge's management style; the inability to hire foreign-trained curators, or qualified specialists from the immigrant community; and the closing of The Canadian Museum of Contemporary Photography.

In 2009, Théberge retired from the National Gallery, and joined the acquisitions committee of the Montreal Museum of Fine Arts. He collaborated with the art critic of Le Devoir Nicolas Mavrikakis, on two books: one a biography penned by Mavrikakis, Les aventures de Pierre Théberge, l’homme qui a osé exposer Tintin au musée, the other an anthology of his own writings (both 2017). He died on October 5, 2018, after a lengthy battle with Parkinson's disease.

== Honours ==
- Knight of the National Order of Quebec (1992);
- Officer of the Order of Canada (2001);
- Queen's Golden Jubilee Medal (2002);
- Royal Canadian Academy of Arts Medal (2005);
- Officer of the French Ordre des Arts et des Lettres (2008)

== Legacy ==
Paris curator and art critic Jean Clair asserted: "Through his actions, his acquisitions, and his exhibitions, [Mr. Théberge] brought Canada into the contemporary era and brought it into the circuit of the big international museums". Théberge said of his career:

Sometimes I’ve fallen flat on my face, but I sincerely believe that I’ve contributed to the improvement of museum collections, and that I’ve expanded our collective view on the art of this place and of this world.

== Personal life ==
Pierre Théberge owned Airedale terriers, named Bobinette and Pistache, whom he brought to the National Gallery offices and for whom he had ID cards made.

== Bibliography ==
- Nicolas Mavrikakis, Les aventures de Pierre Théberge, l’homme qui a osé exposer Tintin au museum. Montreal, Groupe Nota bene (Varia), 2017.
- Pierre Théberge, Écrits et interviews sur l'art, Montreal, Groupe Nota bene (Varia), 2017.
