= Dennis Young (curator) =

Canadian curator, educator, writer (1923-2021)

- Born: Hubert Dennis Young; October 1, 1928; Upwell near Wisbech
- Died: 2021; Halifax, NS
- Education: Goldsmiths, University of London (1950–1953)
- Known for: writer, curator of contemporary art; educator

Dennis Young (October 1, 1928 – 2021) was a curator of contemporary art at the Art Gallery of Ontario, Toronto who afterwards established the art history program at the Nova Scotia College of Art (NSCAD), Halifax.

== Career ==
Young was born in Upwell near Wisbech, in England. In 1946, he joined the Air Training Corps and got a glider pilot's A license, then joined the RAF to become a wireless transmitter mechanic. He attended Goldsmiths, University of London (1950–1953), studying painting and learned there about Sir Herbert Read, whom he admired. He studied the history of art at the Courtauld Institute (CI) (1953 on), then got an academic diploma from the National Gallery of Art (1958).

He joined the Institute of Contemporary Arts and the Society for Education through Art (SEA) in 1956, and from 1957 to 1963, he was editor of "Athene", the journal of the Society. In 1959, he studied at the London University Institute of Education and worked in several schools. In 1963, he emigrated to Canada, settling in Toronto, where he taught while obtaining a degree in Psychology and Sociology from the University of Toronto (1967). That year, he became the second curator of modern art at the Art Gallery of Ontario after Brydon Smith, but changed his title and responsibilities to Curator of Contemporary Art (1967–1972).

His first show was the groundbreaking Canadian Artists '68, which he conceived, and for which he selected the jurors such as Richard Hamilton, Bill Turnbull, and Jonas Mekas who decided the contemporary artists to include. Among these artists were many little-known to the public at the time such as Iain Baxter, Ivan Eyre, Jack Chambers, Greg Curnoe and Michael Snow. The exhibition spread news to England and to America of the high quality of contemporary Canadian art and was reviewed favorably by Lucy Lippard in ArtsCanada.

Young afterwards curated New Alchemy: elements, systems, forces (1969), which included Hans Haacke, Charles Ross, Takis, and John Van Saun, evidence of his international interests and from which he bought Haacke’s Ice Stick (1966), a six-foot refrigerated column, for the gallery. He then did a retrospective of Jack Chambers (1970). In 1970 Young was approached by Curtis Coley, Director of the John and Mable Ringling Museum of Art in Sarasota, Florida, to select the works and write the catalogue introduction for an exhibition of contemporary Canadian painting and sculpture, 49th parallels: new Canadian art. It was the first traveling exhibition of Canadian art to appear in the United States for 26 years, the curator wrote.

The show was followed by what turned out to be Young’s swan song at the Art Gallery of Ontario, an exhibition titled Recent vanguard acquisitions (1971), of his Canadian and International purchases during his years there, mostly sculpture with a predominance of American artists such as Donald Judd and among painters, Chuck Close (Young bought his colossal portrait of "Kent"). The exhibition was reviewed favorably again, this time in the Toronto Star.

In 1972, Young met Gerald Ferguson, who visited him at the Art Gallery of Ontario to show him prints from the NSCAD Lithography Workshop. A year later, Young was invited to create the Art History Department at the Nova Scotia College of Art and Design. When the college created the NSCAD Press, Young chaired the publications committee and oversaw the design and translation of its first book, Paul-Émile Borduas: Écrits/Writings 1942-1958 (1978). Other projects followed. In 1987 Young organized an international conference on Marcel Duchamp and edited the resulting book, The Definitively Unfinished Marcel Duchamp, co-published by the NSCAD Press and MIT Press in 1991.

Young retired in 1990 after serving as Chair of the Art History Department (also called the Department of Historical and Critical Studies) for 18 years. He was then made Professor Emeritus. The Board of Governors appointed Young as a Life Fellow of NSCAD University in 2017.

From 1991-2000, he was a Special Advisor to the National Gallery of Canada's Acquisition Committee. He also wrote Marcel Duchamp, the catalogue for the exhibition Marcel Duchamp: dustballs & readymades, etc. (1997), a National Gallery of Canada travelling exhibitions program. At the start of his "ninth decade", to keep his mind alert, he created his own website at http://www.dennis-young.ca, "Dennis Young: Writings on art" which wittily and persuasively discussed his projects and various writings, book reviews, selected essays and lectures. He was 93 when he died in Halifax, Nova Scotia.
