= Kim Ondaatje =

Canadian artist (born 1928)

- Born: Betty Jane Kimbark; October 2, 1928 (age 97); Toronto, Ontario
- Education: Ontario College of Art, McGill University
- Occupations: painter, photographer, documentary filmmaker
- Spouse(s): D. G. Jones (divorced); Michael Ondaatje (divorced)
- Children: 6

Kim Ondaatje (born Betty Jane Kimbark; born October 2, 1928) is a Canadian painter, photographer, and documentary filmmaker.

== Biography ==
=== Early life and training ===
Born in Toronto, Ontario, Ondaatje studied at the Ontario College of Art and McGill University. She completed a M.A. in Canadian literature at Queen's University, while on a teaching fellowship. Until 1964, Ondaatje served as a part-time lecturer at Wilfrid Laurier University and Sherbrooke University. In the early 1960s she returned to the visual arts again and by 1965 was painting full-time.

=== Founding of Canadian Artists' Representation ===
In 1967, with fellow Canadian artists Jack Chambers and Tony Urquhart, she founded Canadian Artists' Representation, which today is the Canadian Artists Representation/Frontes des Artistes Canadiens (CARFAC). CAR was the first artist organization in the world to establish a fee structure for museum and gallery exhibitions of contemporary artists.

=== Career ===
In her paintings she pursued a variety of interests. Along with abstract and impressionistic landscapes she composed three paintings series: a landscape group entitled the Hill Series; an interior-based group of paintings titled The House on Piccadilly Street; and a final group of large industrial landscapes entitled the Factory Series, completed in the mid-1970s. Ondaatje's research on traditional Ontario quilt-making and design led to a large national touring exhibition of patchwork quilts (1974–1976), and a documentary film. Primarily a visual artist, Ondaatje also directed short documentary films and published books of photography.

In 2008, the Art Museum University of Toronto held a major retrospective entitled Kim Ondaatje: Paintings 1950–1975, the first comprehensive exhibition of Ondaatje's works since 1973. The retrospective was curated by University of Toronto art historian Lora Senechal Carney. In 2021, Renée van der Avoird for the Art Gallery of Ontario curated an exhibition titled Kim Ondaatje: The House on Piccadilly Street, featuring a group of works, created between 1967 and 1969, depicting various scenes of the artist's Victorian house in London, Ontario, accompanied by a film by Ondaatje's grandson, Khyber Jones.

During the course of her career, she worked for Museum London, the Agnes Etherington Art Centre, the Art Gallery of Ontario, and the Emily Carr University of Art and Design outreach program as a travelling artist with her work from 1969 to 1981.

=== Personal life ===
She was married to the Canadian poet D. G. Jones and was later married to the poet and novelist Michael Ondaatje. She has six children.

== Awards ==
In March 2009, Ondaatje and Urquhart were announced as joint winners of a Governor General's Award in Visual and Media Arts, Outstanding Contribution for their role in founding Canadian Artists' Representation (CARFAC), the Canadian Artists’ Representation/Le Front des artistes Canadiens.

== Works ==
=== Collections ===
Her paintings and films are part of various collections in galleries across Canada including: the National Gallery of Canada, the Art Gallery of Ontario, the Montreal Museum of Fine Arts, the Doris McCarthy Gallery at the University of Toronto, The McIntosh Gallery, University of Western Ontario, London, the Art Gallery of Windsor, Simon Fraser University, B.C., the Robert McLaughlin Gallery, and the Confederation Centre Art Gallery, in Prince Edward Island.

=== Short films ===
- Black Creek, 1972, (16 mm, colour)
- Factories, 1973, (16 mm, colour)
- Patchwork Quilts, 1974, (11 min., 16 mm, colour)
- Old Houses, 1977 (27 min., 16 mm, colour)
- Where Bitter Sweet Grows, 1978, (16 mm, colour)

=== Books ===
- Old Ontario Houses, 1977
- Small Churches of Canada, 1982
- Toronto, My City, 1993
