= Dennis Young =

Dennis Young may refer to:

- Dennis Young (Australian politician) (born 1947), Australian politician and anti-drug campaigner
- Dennis Young (Canadian politician)
- Dennis Young (curator) (1928–2021), Canadian curator
- Dennis Young (diver) (born 1944), English former diver
- Dennis Young (Papua New Guinean politician) (1936–2008), acting Governor-General of Papua New Guinea in 1991
- Dennis Young (rugby union) (1930–2020), New Zealand rugby union player

== See also ==
- Dennis DeYoung (born 1947), American singer-songwriter
