= Michael Murphy (sculptor) =

American sculptor (born 1975)

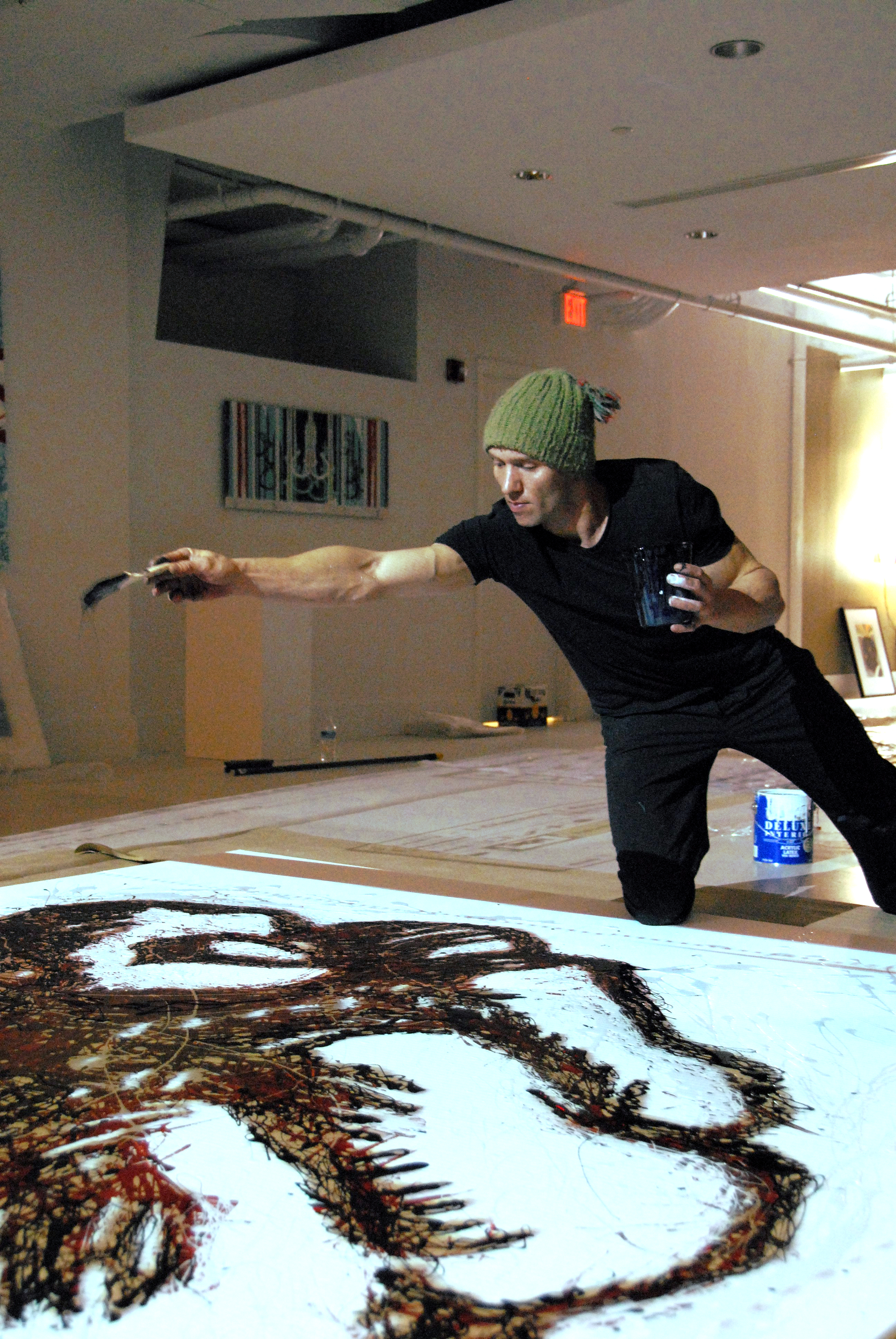
- Born: 22 March 1975 (age 51); Youngstown, Ohio, U.S.
- Education: Kent State University (BFA); Art Institute of Chicago (MFA)
- Known for: Sculpture, perceptual art, installation art
- Movement: Perceptual art
- Website: mmike.com

Michael Murphy (born March 22, 1975) is an American artist, sculptor and pioneer of the perceptual art movement. Murphy became widely known during the 2008 U.S. presidential election, after creating the first portrait of candidate Barack Obama in 2007 that influenced thousands of artists to contribute to the "Art for Obama" movement, documented in Shepard Fairey's book Art for Obama: Designing Manifest Hope and the Campaign for Change.

His approach is to challenge the viewer's boundaries using multidimensional techniques in order to create three-dimensional renderings of flat images. His inventions of "Expanded Graphics", the "3D Halftone" and "Suspended Narrative Mobiles" have established an entirely new formula for rendering images.

== Background ==
Murphy was born in Youngstown, Ohio. He earned his Bachelor of Fine Arts and sculpture training from Kent State University in 2000. He then earned his Master of Fine Arts in art and technology from The Art Institute of Chicago while focusing on sound art, installation and metal casting. In 2000 Murphy began his teaching career at the Art Institute of Chicago. He taught at various universities for twelve years until he retired in 2013 to focus exclusively on his art. According to his website, "for the past two years Michael has been partnering with Michael Jordan and Nike creating centerpiece works of art for their retail environments incorporating Murphy's stylistic approach into the Jordan Brand."

== Works ==
Michael Murphy's work has been exhibited widely ranging from intimate gallery settings to large outdoor public installations. Murphy has shown exhibited alongside Shepard Fairey, Swoon and Ron English. His work has been featured in Time magazine, New York Magazine, ARK Magazine, American Artist Drawing Magazine, Uptown Magazine, Washington Life Magazine, Art for Obama, and Designing Obama. His works are held in private collections in Munich, London, Zürich, Los Angeles, Atlanta, New York City, Chicago, Cleveland and Washington, D.C. One of his pieces, Come Together, is currently touring with an art installation show known as "Point of View" hosted by Wonderspaces.

Murphy creates every piece carefully considering the viewer and the experience they will have when seeing the piece. His large-scale installations "dominate the viewer's physical and mental space, captivating the critical thought process." His work at first looks like an unorganized composition of material, but when viewed from a proper angle, becomes a highly organized suspended three dimensional graphic image. Murphy's breadth of work ranges "from sound installations utilizing pools of water and live cellos to the incorporation of shadows as shading. Murphy's ability to think outside the box, and his technical skill to bring the concepts to fruition, make his work a fun, imaginative and accessible experience."

=== Obama art ===
Murphy created the first portrait of Barack Obama in 2007 as soon as his campaign launched. During the 2008 U.S. presidential election Michael Murphy was inspired by the "hope" and potential for "change" Obama campaigned on and the "hope that change is really possible". Murphy's wire portrait of Obama received critical acclaim and was featured in Time magazine's December 2008 issue. In 2012 Time magazine commissioned Murphy to create a portrait of Barack Obama for their Person of the Year issue. He worked with a variety of mediums ranging from nails to high-tension wire, pastels, and even cardboard. "Several pieces use directional light and shadows to create images. These works seem to change form depending on the line of sight, making them interactive for viewers." Michael was commissioned to create three pieces for Manifest Hope, art shows featuring artists who "used their talents to motivate the grassroots movement that carried Barack Obama to victory."

==== Obama Nail Portrait (2007) ====
(Wood, light, nails, and shadows - 24" × 24" × 4")

In 2007 Michael Murphy began creating portraits of Barack Obama. One of his earliest portraits of Obama was created by the shadow cast by 6,400 nails hammered into a canvas. The shadows produced by each nail when lit properly form the likeness of Obama. The Obama Art Report, which covered all of the work produced during the 2008 presidential election wrote that, "In an artistic movement so heavily inundated with design work, prints and street art, Murphy's nail portrait came as a breath of fresh air."

==== Tension wire portrait (2008) ====
(High tension wire - 24" × 24" × 96")

Murphy's sculpture Tension received critical acclaim and was featured in Time's year-end edition that featured the most prominent Obama artworks. Murphy used 1000 feet of high tension steel wire to create a profile portrait of Obama. "Obama's image pops out of the sculpture only if viewers stand at a precise location; otherwise, they see only a mess of wire." The portrait was displayed as the prominent piece of the Manifest Hope: DC art show, curated by Shepard Fairey.

==== Electoral Divide (2012) ====
In 2012 Time magazine commissioned Murphy to create a portrait of Barack Obama, their 2012 Person of the Year. The result was a multilayered cardboard sculpture that Time hailed as an "incredible piece". The final portrait consisted of 66 hand-cut and painted cardboard plates suspended from white braided fibers. In Michael's own words,

It was created considering the perception of the viewer. When viewed from different vantage points, the piece offers varied experiences. Straight on, the shapes are perfectly organized, creating a graphic portrait of Obama as a strong leader. As the viewer moves around the sculpture, seeing it and the point of view changes, the image of the President becomes distorted and the layers become their own separate pieces. In the distortion, viewers are encouraged to see the red and blue edges of the plates as indications of the electoral divides. From the side, the forward momentum of the piece, as it protrudes into space suggests growth, progress, movement and the partisan divide.

CNN and many other international news organizations highlighted Murphy's work propelling him to international fame, and providing him with a platform for his activist art.

=== Art as activism ===
==== Ed Port ====
Ed Port was diagnosed at the age of 3 with neurofibromatosis type II, which caused a growing tumor on his face. The growth of the tumor "obscured the vision in his left eye, damaged his hearing and led to the removal of part of his jawbone"; however his insurance considered the surgeries cosmetic in nature and would not provide coverage. Murphy saw his newfound fame from his Obama portraits as a platform to help Ed and bring attention to his struggle. As CNN reported at the time, "he realized he could redirect the buzz aimed at his work toward a friend in need." He made a film showcasing Ed's struggle, developed a website for Ed, and sold his Obama Nail Portrait on eBay to raise money and bring awareness to Ed's desperate need for surgery. After CNN interviewed Murphy and aired portions of the video he made for Ed Port, a surgeon reached out to Ed and offered to perform the surgery at no cost to Ed.

==== Damage (2013) ====
(Black balls, steel, and braided fiber - 10 ft × 20 ft × 10 ft)

Murphy's sculptural feat Damage consists of 1,200 ping pong balls painted black and suspended from the ceiling, when viewed from the correct angle the balls coalesce into an expanded graphic of an assault rifle. The piece was created with the ongoing gun control debate in America in mind, and stands as a metaphor for the role perspective plays in shaping this dialogue. The physical arrangement of the piece seems at first unorganized, until it is viewed from the proper perspective when a fully formed assault rifle comes into view. As Murphy said when the piece was released,

Guns are fetishized in America. Historically, secret societies have used little black balls to indicate a "no" vote. In this installation the ping pong balls are like little votes against gun culture. The large gun is designed to be beautiful and adored, and I'm trying to show how inappropriate that is, on a massive scale

Instead of taking a side in the debate, the piece was meant to further communication and discussion about gun control, gun culture and the use of guns in America.

==== Gun Country (2014) ====
(150 toy guns - 12 ft × 20 ft × 12 ft)

Gun Country is an expanded graphic of the United States rendered using 130 suspended toy guns. The controversial installation which received much praise from both sides of the gun debate, was meant to foster conversation about the prevalence of guns in America. The widespread media coverage the piece received did just that, and allowed millions of people to engage in conversation about their stance on guns and gun related issues in America. The piece was created for ArtPrize 2014 and installed on the terrace of the Urban Institute for Contemporary Arts in Grand Rapids, Michigan.

==== Perceptual Shift ====
(3D halftone sculpture - 1,252 wood balls, paint, and braided fibers - 12 ft × 8 ft × 10 ft)

==== Come Together ====
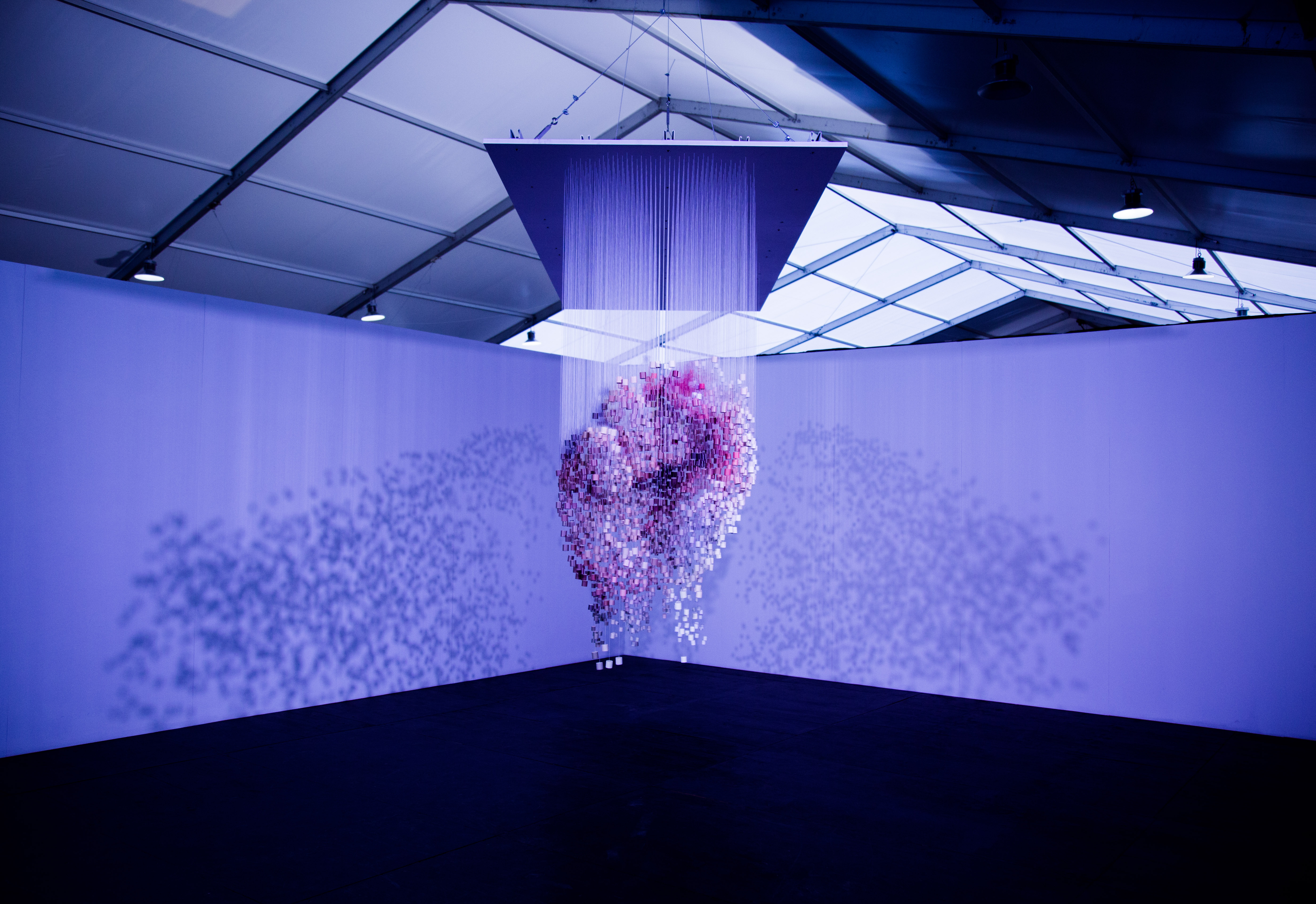
Come Together by Michael Murphy

Come together is a symbol of power. It depicts Murphy's girlfriend's fist raised during the Women's March in D.C. in early 2018. There are over 2000 pieces of wood that make up the shape. This piece is currently being shown in an interactive art show known as "Point of View" that is touring within a company named Wonderspaces.

== Selected exhibitions ==
- 2015: Perceptual Shift. I.M.A.G.E. Gallery. Brooklyn, NY
- 2014: Gun Country. Urban Institute for Contemporary Art, Artprize 2014, Grand Rapids, MI.
- 2013: In God We Trust. The Zacheta National Gallery, Warsaw, Poland.
- 2011: Look - The Work of Michael Murphy. Gallery Nine5, New York City.
- 2011: Reform School. New York City.
- 2010: Manifest Equality. Los Angeles, CA.
- 2010: Digital Artifacts. Solo show. Arts Clayton Gallery. Atlanta GA.
- 2009: Manifest Hope DC. Washington DC. Commissioned.
- 2009: Can and Did. Danziger Projects. Manhattan, NY.
- 2009: Obama Art. Heineman Myers. Gallery. Bethesda, Md.
- 2009: 44 - The 2008 works of Michael Murphy. Georgia College Museum at GCSU. Milledgeville, GA
- 2008: Hope. Blackbridge Gallery at Georgia College and State University. Milledgeville, GA.
- 2008: Merge Visual. Museum of Arts and Sciences. Macon, GA.
- 2008: Transformative Collection. GCSU Faculty Exhibition. Blackbridge Gallery, Milledgeville GA.
- 2008: Choral Impressions. Milledgeville, GA.
- 2007: Current. Asterisk Gallery. Cleveland, OH.
