= DHMakerBus =

Mobile educational facility

Overview
- Type: Mobile makerspace and technology education classroom
- Manufacturer: Beth Compton, Kim Martin, and Ryan Hunt
- Also called: The MakerBus
- Model years: 2013

The MakerBus, also known as the DHMakerBus, is a mobile makerspace and technology education classroom in London, Ontario. The MakerBus claims to be the first of its kind in Canada.

== History ==
The MakerBus was founded in 2013 by Beth Compton, Kim Martin, and Ryan Hunt. The bus was created for two purposes. First, it was intended to be used to take attendees of the Digital Humanities 2013 Conference from Southern Ontario and Michigan to the conference in Lincoln, Nebraska. Second, the MakerBus was created to help provide greater access to technology, making, and education to the London/Middlesex region. To raise money for the project, then called the "DHMakerBus," an Indiegogo crowd-funding campaign was launched on April 8, 2013 with a funding goal of $10,000. At the end of the two-month funding window, the DHMakerBus received $2,856 in community funding. With this funding the MakerBus team purchased a used school bus.

== Activities ==
The MakerBus team seeks to promote access to technology and education in the London/Middlesex region. In the first year of its operation the MakerBus worked with community partners to create pop-up educational events that promoted non-traditional uses of technology. The MakerBus has worked with a number of educational partners in London, like Literacy Link South Central, the London Public Libraries, and the Western Fair.

== Projects ==
To date the largest project undertaken by the MakerBus is the MAKE London Wearable Technology and Made Clothing Fashion Show. This event was held in partnership with Museum London and saw homemade clothing designers from around Southern Ontario come together to create a fashion show that celebrated the fashion and technology. Other projects include an ongoing partnership with Literacy Link South Central (a part of the Ontario Literacy Network) to create classes that focus on improving adult digital literacy skills. Past examples of these classes include using quadcopters as a teaching tool for math skills and using the MakeyMakey to build confidence in adult learners. The MakerBus team has held community events in London to raise awareness of the maker movement like the MAKE London Day of Making that brought together local makers and members of the general public.

== Partners ==
The MakerBus works with a variety of partners in London, ON. Partners include:

Literacy Link South Central London Public Libraries Thames Valley District School Board Bread and Roses Books Ontario Library Association
