= London Regionalism =

London Regionalism is a Canadian art movement that developed in the late 1950s and 1960s in London, Ontario, Canada. Artists in the movement included Greg Curnoe, Tony Urquhart, Murray Favro, Ron Martin and Jack Chambers.

The movement was composed of a group of artists who acknowledged their home as the centre and subject of creative activity; who acknowledged yet refused to situate themselves in the art world of the metropolitan centre; who refused to participate in ‘movements’. In fact, the term "regionalism" was adopted by the community in a spirit of defiance after a Toronto critic used it in a derisive way to describe the scene. The movement is jokingly referred to as not an "ism" at all, but "a group of artists who had decided to stay home."

As Canadian curator and art historian Terrence Heath wrote: "In the late sixties and seventies, Canadian artists and writers from coast to coast embraced the belief that art can only be made out of the specifics of life, place and time. Curnoe was one of many, but he was a leader and one of the strongest voices....It was not that they rejected all art made in what are called ‘art centres’ per se, but that they rejected the right of any person or group to prescribe what art should be....They sought out and found, in their own lives and localities, the stuff of their art."

Greg Curnoe stated in 1983 that London Regionalism was in no way related to 1930s American Regionalism. His various studios served as meeting places for the artists in the movement, who supported each other but developed their own distinct practices. London Regionalism garnered national recognition with the National Gallery of Canada's 1968 exhibition Heart of London, which travelled to smaller cities across the country.

Art historian Mark Cheetham maintains that Jack Chambers's "theory of 'perceptual realism' challenges parochial notions of regionalism." Chambers "was closely involved with the London art scene [but] was trained in Spain and kept his eye on the work of friends there. His reputation as an avant-garde filmmaker was international, and his constant technical experimentation was in line with developments in the United States."

By the late sixties, the movement became an object of interest for Canadian art critics. In art historian Barry Lord’s 1969 article in Art in America, he describes London as an art phenomenon as "the most important art centre in Canada and a model for artists working elsewhere, the site of 'Canada’s first regional liberation front.'"
