= The Hart of London =

- Directed by: Jack Chambers
- Release date: 1970
- Running time: 79 min.
- Country: Canada

The Hart of London is a 1970 experimental Canadian film directed by Jack Chambers. Stan Brakhage proclaimed it as "one of the greatest films ever made". The film is shown in black and white and colour, and includes found news footage from 1954, film shot by the artist years earlier in Spain, and film shot by the artist in London, Ontario.

The film is preoccupied with the tensions between nature and the city of London: "It explores life and death, the sense of place and personal displacement, and the intricate aesthetics of representation. It is a personal and spiritual film, marked inevitably by Chambers' knowledge that he had leukemia."
