= Philip Aziz =

Canadian artist (1923–2009)

Philip J.A.F. Aziz (April 15, 1923 – September 13, 2009) was a Canadian artist. He lived in London, Ontario, and was of Lebanese Greek Orthodox Christian descent. He was recognized for his work in the technique of egg tempera-en-gesso panel, a method popular during the Renaissance.

== Early years ==
Aziz was born in St. Thomas, Ontario, before moving to London, Ontario, at an early age.

He grew up in old South London and attended H.B. Beal Secondary School, enrolling in its arts program. Aziz graduated from Yale University with a Master of Fine Arts degree in 1949. He next travelled the world, living alternately in New York City and London, Ontario, where he resided in his now heritage-designated home, also the site of his studio and art gallery.

From 1947 to 1949 Aziz was an art instructor at Yale University and a lecturer at various colleges and museums throughout Canada and the United States. From 1950 to 1955, Aziz lectured at the University of Western Ontario (UWO), teaching art and art history as well as helping to expand the collection at UWO's McIntosh Gallery. He was UWO's first official artist in residence in 1953. In 1972 and 1976, Aziz was the artist in residence and lecturer at the Aspen Institute for Humanistic Studies in Aspen, Colorado.

Aziz painted commissioned portraits of Ontario's Progressive Conservative Premier the Honorable John Robarts, Governor-General Georges Vanier and Mrs. Vanier, noted Canadian photographer Yousuf Karsh, and mezzo-soprano opera star Rise Stevens.

In the late 1950s Aziz was commissioned by John Christopher Cody, London's seventh Catholic bishop, to transform the former Sacred Heart Chapel in London's St. Peter's Cathedral Basilica into Christ the King Chapel and design the interior of the Lady Chapel.

== Later years ==
In the early 1970s Aziz successfully fought for the retention and refurbishment of the historic old Court House and Gaol at the Forks of the Thames River in London, Ontario, and developed a plan for the redevelopment of the river forks, which attracted support and attention from Premier John Robarts, the then London South MP John White, author Pierre Berton, and TV and radio station owner, and newspaper publisher Walter J. Blackburn. Aziz's redevelopment plan lost by one vote at London City Council, but many of his ideas were implemented in 2005–2006, with the completion of the multi-staged, multimillion-dollar 'Forks-of-the-Thames Project'.

Aziz established the Philip Aziz Foundation of Art, a non-profit charity in London, to expand his gallery, built in 1967 as his Canadian Centennial project.

=== 2000s ===
On June 2, 2006, at Museum London, Aziz unveiled his egg tempera-en-gesso painting Follow Me, a tribute to the late Pope John Paul II. The unveiling occurred during an Alumni Western event, a gala attended by several hundred University of Western Ontario alumni, and members of the local media.

On September 11, 2006, in council chambers at city hall and on behalf of the City of London, Aziz presented Academy Award-winning screenwriter and filmmaker Paul Haggis with his painting Celestial City, completed in 1974. The day had been named Paul Haggis Day, and the city announced that a future park in southwest London would be named in Haggis's honour.

On October 21, 2006, during the Islamic Centre of Southwestern Ontario's annual feast following the holy month of Ramadan, Aziz unveiled his egg tempera-on-gesso-panel and 24-carat gold leaf work titled the Tree of Lebanon, completed as a humanitarian fundraiser for relief efforts in Lebanon. The painting is mounted on a five by three foot panel of Lebanese cedar. Five hundred full-size colour prints signed by Aziz were sold for $1,000 each. The painting was to be displayed at the UN headquarters in New York City, after which it was to hang in the presidential palace in Lebanon.

On November 29, 2006, London International Airport unveiled Aziz's twelve by seven foot egg tempera painting Epilogue, completed in 1976. Aziz had agreed to loan the painting to the airport for three years.

== Death ==
Philip Aziz died on September 13, 2009, after a 10-year battle with cancer.

== Awards and honours ==
In 1968 Aziz was invited to the Republican and Democratic national conventions. He took a side trip to Texas, where then-Governor John Smith made him an honorary admiral in the Texas Navy.

On October 20, 2005, the London Free Press published two special sections called 150 People Who Define London. Mr. Aziz was included at No. 30.

Philip Aziz Avenue, which runs through the University of Western Ontario campus, is named for him.
