= Brydon Smith =

Canadian curator (1938-2022)

- Born: Brydon Evans Smith; February 1, 1938; Hamilton, Ontario
- Died: July 19, 2022 (aged 84); Ottawa, Ontario
- Education: B.A. in science at McMaster University (grad. 1961), M.A. in art history at University of Toronto (grad. 1965)
- Known for: art curator and museum administrator
- Spouse(s): Jane Irwin (d. 2013), Ann Thomas (m. 1986)
- Awards: Governor General's Award in Visual and Media Arts (2014)

Brydon Smith (February 1, 1938 – July 19, 2022) was an art curator and museum administrator who had an impact on International and Canadian art history. As Assistant Director and Director of Research and Collections at the National Gallery of Canada (NGC), he helped plan and realize the new building in 1988, for which he received a Public Service Award of Merit. Among his acquisitions of works of art for galleries was Claes Oldenburg's Floor Burger (Art Gallery of Ontario, Toronto) and Barnett Newman's Voice of Fire (1967, National Gallery of Canada, Ottawa). As a result of his purchases, exhibitions, and publications, particularly of postwar American art, the National Gallery of Canada acquired credibility in a broader North American cultural context. In 2014, he was awarded the Governor General's Award in Visual and Media Arts.

== Career ==
Smith received his B.A. in science at McMaster University, graduating in 1961 and received an M.A. in art history at University of Toronto, graduating in 1965. In the same year, he started to work as an assistant curator at the Art Gallery of Toronto (renamed in 1966 the Art Gallery of Ontario (AGO)). He began by helping with the exhibition catalogue for a Canaletto show organized by W.G. Constable and Jean Sutherland Boggs, the AGO curator. Smith's first exhibition was of Duncan Macpherson. He then assisted scholar Robert Welsh (1932–2000) with organizing a major survey of Piet Mondrian (Art Gallery of Ontario, 1966), in collaboration with the Philadelphia Museum of Art and the Gemeentemuseum, The Hague. In late 1966 or early 1967, Smith was promoted to curator of modern art, the first such appointment which established a separate department in what had been called "the curator" in the Art Gallery of Toronto.

Among his acquisitions at the Art Gallery of Ontario were the following outstanding works by Canadian and American artists: Joyce Wieland (Time Machine Series (1961)), Jim Dine (Black Bathroom #2 (1962)), Kenneth Noland (C (1964)), Frank Stella (Ossippee (1965)), Morris Louis (Lambda (1960–61)), Andy Warhol (Elvis I & II (1964)), George Segal (The Butcher Shop (1965)), and Claes Oldenburg (Floor Burger (1962)), among others. Besides these prescient purchases, he organized the important exhibition titled Dine, Oldenburg, Segal (1967), which helped to introduce the Canadian public to Pop art.

Smith followed Jean Boggs to the National Gallery of Canada in 1967. The year of his arrival, 1967, he acquired Jackson Pollock's No. 29, 1950 and Warhol's Brillo Soap Pads Boxes (1964) for the National Gallery. By the following summer, he had purchased Robert Morris's Untitled (1967–68) and James Rosenquist's Capillary Action II (1963). Smith also was instrumental in choosing Canadian artists for the national pavilion at the Venice biennale: Ulysse Comtois and Guido Molinari in 1968, Michael Snow in 1970, and Gershon Iskowitz and Walter Redinger in 1972.

The first exhibition Smith curated at the Gallery in Ottawa James Rosenquist (1968) was the artist's first museum survey. He followed it with a travelling show of Dan Flavin titled fluorescent light, etc. from Dan Flavin (1969), the first museum survey of Flavin's work. In 1969, he also curated an exhibition of sculptor Robert Murray for the São Paulo Biennial. In 1973, he and Pierre Théberge co-curated Boucherville, Montreal, Toronto, London which introduced artists such as Ron Martin to the Canadian public. In 1975, he organized a survey of Donald Judd's work, accompanied by a catalogue raisonné.

In 1979, Smith was made assistant director and Director of Research and Collections at the National Gallery, where through the mid-1980s he played a key role in the planning and realization of the new National Gallery of Canada building in 1988, for which he received a Public Service Award of Merit.

During his tenure, Smith made nearly one hundred acquisitions for the national collection by artists such as Agnes Martin, Michael Snow, and Louise Bourgeois.

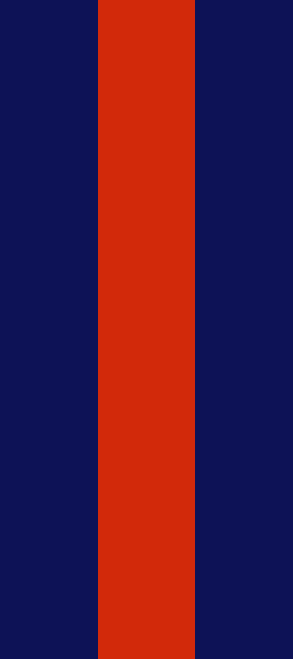
Voice-of-fire-mock-up

It was when he acquired Barnett Newman's Voice of Fire (1967) for the National Gallery in 1989 that he drew a barage of criticism. It was a virtual firestorm and a massive controversy. Smith followed this purchase with the acquisition of Mark Rothko's No. 16, again controversial largely due to its price.

In 1993, he requested and took a sabbatical from the gallery and when he came back, he was appointed Curator of Modern Art. Smith retired from the National Gallery in 1999.

In the years following 2000, he continued to work with artists he had championed such as Dan Flavin, Donald Judd and Ron Martin. In 2001, he contributed to a symposium and publication in Marfa, Texas by the Chinati Foundation titled Light in Architecture and Art: The Work of Dan Flavin. A Symposium Hosted by The Chinati Foundation, Marfa, Texas, May 5 and 6, 2001 In 2004, he contributed an essay to Dan Flavin: a retrospective, organized the National Gallery of Art in Washington. In 2014, he was awarded the Governor General's Award in Visual and Media Arts. Brydon Smith died in Ottawa in 2022. The Brydon Smith fonds is in the NGC Library and Archives.
