= Walter Redinger =

Canadian artist (1940-2014)

- Born: Walter Frederick Redinger; January 6, 1940; Wallacetown, Ontario
- Died: June 17, 2014 (aged 74); Dutton, Ontario
- Education: H. B. Beal Secondary School, London (1957-1958); Minsinger School of Art, Detroit (1958); Ontario College of Art, Toronto with Jock Macdonald (1958-1960)
- Spouse(s): Marian Manchester, married 1961
- Awards: Pollock-Krasner Foundation Inc., New York; Gottlieb Foundation, New York; Canada Council grants (1968-1976); Victor Martyn Lynch-Staunton Award (1975)
- Elected: member in 1973, Royal Canadian Academy of Arts

Walter Redinger RCA (January 06, 1940 – June 17, 2014) was a Canadian sculptor, best known for large-cast fiberglass works that resemble fleshy shapes. He was one of the earliest sculptors in Canada to use fiberglass.

== Career ==
Redinger grew up on a tobacco farm in West Lorne, near London, Ontario. After attending Beal Technical School, in London, Ontario to study art (1957–1958), he went to the Minsinger School of Art, in Detroit (1958), and then the Ontario College of Art, in Toronto (1958–1960), studying with Jock Macdonald, whom he remembered especially After dropping out of art school, he returned to West Lorne to work and build his studio in the company of Ed Zelenak who had studied with him in London and Detroit. In West Lorne, he experimented with sculpture and in 1963, began using fiberglass.

Reidinger had his first solo exhibition of the dozen or so figurative pieces he had made at West Lorne at the Isaacs Gallery in Toronto in 1963. In 1968, he showed again in a solo exhibition at the Isaacs Gallery. By now, his work resembled the fleshy parts of the body, abstracted, which a critic traced to Henry Moore's sensibility and organic forms, especially Moore's work after 1962. Redinger's third solo show at the Isaacs in 1970, "Organic Engine Combine", showed, he believed, the impact of the automobile on man.

Throughout the 1960s and 1970s, Redinger was one of Canada's most prominent and internationally known artists. In the mid-1990s and until close to his death, Redinger produced a large body of innovative work. Redinger divided his 50-year career as a sculptor into different and sometimes disparate phases from organic fibreglass sculptures, single, then after 1968, in groups, to what he termed Skeletals, and sculpture that might be suspended rather than earth-borne. Of particular importance was Redinger's organic sculpture period of 1965–1972. Xabis (1972), a six-unit sculpture was sited at the Court House in London, Ontario. Caucasian Totems (1972), a six-unit work, was exhibited along with Klonos, which was purchased by the National Gallery of Canada, at the Venice Biennial in 1972. His exhibition in Venice (along with Gershon Iskowitz) sealed his reputation. By 1974, Redinger created his Industrial Totem Sets "1929–1986 Landscape", which he once described as large mechanical chess sets, and in 1978, striped land formations in black and white, which had an exotic zebra-like effect.

Redinger received critical attention in 2007 for his 42-foot long Ghost Ship (1990–2006), considered by many his masterpiece. It was shown in the show Walter Redinger: Return to the Void, curated by David Liss for the Museum of Contemporary Canadian Art in Toronto, and in 2008, in Museum London. Canadian Art magazine suggested Ghost Ship was an abstract expression of certain spiritual states. Considering Redinger's career over 40 years, it called Redinger's work in all mediums (Redinger did paintings and prints too) intensely eccentric and Redinger himself a maker of odd forms.

Redinger's work is in public collections such as the National Gallery of Canada, the Art Gallery of Ontario, and Museum London which owns over 50 of his works, one of which, "Two Units", is found in front of the museum. Western University's McIntosh Gallery has seven of Redinger's works, the largest of which, "Adhesion Wall" (1968), is installed on the first floor of Weldon library. Other commissioned works can be seen at The Art Gallery of St. Thomas-Elgin, Concordia University in Montreal; Confederation Park, Gananoque; Gairloch Gardens, Oakville; the University of Guelph; the National Parks Commission, Ottawa; and at the Het National Ballet in the Netherlands.

== Awards ==
- 1975 Canada Council's Victor Martyn Lynch-Staunton Award

== Personal life ==
Walter Redinger played the guitar and formed The Walter Band which played at exhibitions. In 1996, he was diagnosed with Parkinson's disease. He died of Parkinson's disease June 17, 2014 in Dutton, Ontario.
