= Emily Urquhart =

Canadian writer (born 1977)

- Born: 1977 (age 48–49)
- Education: Queen's University at Kingston; Memorial University of Newfoundland (PhD)
- Occupation: Writer
- Parent(s): Tony Urquhart; Jane Carter
- Website: emilyurquhart.ca

Emily Urquhart (born 1977) is a Canadian writer. She is most noted for her 2022 book Ordinary Wonder Tales, which was a shortlisted finalist for the 2023 Hilary Weston Writers' Trust Prize for Nonfiction.

== Background ==
The daughter of artist Tony Urquhart and writer Jane Urquhart, she did her undergraduate education at Queen's University, and worked as a freelance writer and book reviewer before completing her Ph.D. in folklore studies at Memorial University of Newfoundland.

== Writing career ==
Urquhart's first book, Beyond the Pale: Folklore, Family and the Mystery of Our Hidden Genes, was published in 2015. A memoir of her experience giving birth to a daughter who was diagnosed with albinism, the book was shortlisted for British Columbia's National Award for Canadian Non-Fiction in 2016.

In 2020 she published The Age of Creativity: Art, Memory, My Father and Me, a memoir of her childhood experiences learning about art from her father.

Ordinary Wonder Tales, a collection of essays about the intersection between memory and cultural folklore, was published in fall 2022.

Urquhart currently teaches creative writing at the University of Waterloo.
