= Nihilist Spasm Band =

Canadian noise band

- Also known as: NSB
- Origin: London, Ontario, Canada
- Genres: Noise; free improvisation
- Years active: 1965–present
- Label: Alchemy
- Members: John Clement; John Boyle; Murray Favro; Art Pratten
- Past members: Archie Leitch; Greg Curnoe; Hugh McIntyre; Bill Exley
- Website: www.nonsb.ca

The Nihilist Spasm Band (NSB) is a Canadian noise band formed in 1965 in London, Ontario, by Hugh McIntyre, John Clement, John Boyle, Bill Exley, Murray Favro, Archie Leitch, Art Pratten, and Greg Curnoe. The term "spasm band" refers to a band that uses homemade instruments.

Leitch has since retired, Curnoe was struck and killed by a pickup truck while cycling in 1992. Aya Ohnishi (a Japanese fan who organized NSB tours of Japan) joined the band on drums starting in 1999. McIntyre died of heart failure in 2004. Bill Exley died in July of 2025.

The Nihilist Spasm Band have been cited as the longest running self-described "noise" band and an influence on Sonic Youth, Negativland, and Einstürzende Neubauten.

== History ==
The Nihilist Spasm Band was formed in 1965, bringing together a group of individuals who frequented Greg Curnoe's art studio on King Street in London, Ontario. The band secured a Monday night residency at the York Hotel, performing as a noise experiment in exchange for free drinks. That residency eventually moved to another bar (Victoria Tavern) and later, the band was given a permanent space at the Forest City Gallery (opened in 1973). The band played the Gallery regularly for years thereafter.

Most of the NSB's instruments are modifications of other instruments, or wholly invented by the members. In addition to the homemade instruments, members are encouraged to improvise. The range of the improvisation is such that instruments are not tuned to each other, tempos and time signatures are not imposed, and the members push the ranges of their instrumentation by engaging in constant innovation and ever-increasing volume over the course of a performance.

Regular jam sessions would also take a place at No Haven, a cottage owned by Curnoe in Grand Bend, Ontario. The band also represented Canada at the 1969 edition of Biennale de Paris, performing at the Musée d'Art Moderne de Paris.

The Nihilist Spasm Band has performed in France on several occasions, in addition to shows in England, Switzerland, Germany, the Czech Republic and two different tours of Japan (1996 and 2016). Recordings from the second NSB tour of Japan were released on compact disc by Alchemy Records.

The Nihilist Spasm Band celebrated its 50th anniversary of live performance in 2015. It marked the occasion with a series of live appearances with American jazz musician Joe McPhee in London, Guelph and Toronto.

== Influence and legacy ==
The Nihilist Spasm Band have been cited as an influence on Sonic Youth, Negativland, and Einstürzende Neubauten.

The Nihilist Spasm Band opened for Sonic Youth at the Kool Haus in Toronto in 2002. Sonic Youth's Thurston Moore also played with NSB at the Forest City Gallery in 1998. This performance can be found on the No Music Box CD collection from Forced Exposure. When Bill Exley passed in 2025, Moore called him "the greatest lead vocalist in the history of music" as part a tribute post on Instagram.

In 2004, members of R.E.M. jammed with NSB members at the London's Dissent club. R.E.M. was visiting London to perform at the John Labatt Centre.

Best-selling Canadian author Malcolm Gladwell was taught and inspired by NSB vocalist Bill Exley at Elmira District Secondary School, where Exley worked for many years as a teacher.

Zev Asher's documentary film What About Me: The Rise of The Nihilist Spasm Band premiered at the Toronto International Film Festival in 2000. Drawing from the inspiration of finding a copy of the Nihilist Spasm Band's first L.P. No Canada in the pile of 1970's ephemera in his family's basement, the documentary explores the legacy of the NSB as Canadian noise music pioneers.

The Nihilist Spasm Band were inducted into the London Music Hall of Fame in 2003, alongside Helix, the Demics and several other artists.

== Discography ==
- The Sweetest Country This Side of Heaven (vinyl single, 1967; reissued on CD, 1996), Arts Canada
- No Record (vinyl LP, 1968; reissued on CD, 1996; reissued on vinyl, 2000), Allied Record Corporation
- Vol. 2 (vinyl LP, 1979; reissued on CD, 1996), Music Gallery Editions
- 1984 (audiocassette, 1984; reissued on CD, 1999), Chimik Communications
- ¬x~x=x (vinyl lp, 1985; reissued on CD, 1996), United Dairies Records
- What About Me (CD, 1992), Alchemy Records
- Live in Japan (CD, 1997), Alchemy Records
- Every Monday Night (CD, 1999), Alchemy Records
- No Borders with Joe McPhee (2xCD, 2001), Non Musica Rex
- NSB Live at Western Front (CD, 2006), NSB
- No Nihilist Spasm Band in Mulhouse (vinyl LP, 2007), Les Mondes Mental
- No Borders to No Borders with Reynols (CD, 2007), Disques Hushush
- Live In Geneve, Switzerland October 2006 with Fossils (cassette, 2007), Wintage Records & Tapes
- theBESTweCANdo (best-of compilation) (CD, 2008), NSB
- Nothing is Forever (LP, 2013), Wintage Records & Tapes, WRT-99
- Breaking Wind (LP, 2013), Rekem Records, Rekem 04
- No Record (vinyl LP re-re-release, 2014), Pacemaker Entertainment, Ltd., LION LP-136
- Fluxus (vinyl Split-LP with Kommissar Hjuler, 2015), Psych. kg
- Last Concert in Japan (CD, 2016), Alchemy Records, TECH-24486

=== Appears on ===
- No Music Box — No Music Festival 1998 (6-CD box set, 1998), Entartete Kunst Recordings
- no99 — No Music Festival 1999 (5-CD box set, 1999), Entartete Kunst Recordings
- No Nothing — No Music Festival (6-CD box set, 2000), Non Musica Rex

== Members ==
- John Clement – guitar, bass guitar, drums
- John Boyle – kazoo, thumb piano, drums
- Bill Exley – vocals, cooking pot
- Murray Favro – guitar
- Art Pratten – "pratt-a-various," water-pipe

=== Guest performers ===
- Aya Onishi – drums, kazoo, "constant guest performer" since 1999
- Owen Curnoe – Drums
- Mark Favro – Casio keyboard
- Galen Curnoe – guitar
- Tim Glasgow

=== Previous members ===
- Hugh McIntyre – bass guitar (1965–2004)
- Archie Leitch – slide clarinet (1965–?)
- Greg Curnoe – kazoo, drums (1965–1992)
