= Henry Saxe =

Canadian sculptor (born 1937

- Born: September 24, 1937 (age 88); Montreal, Quebec, Canada
- Known for: sculptor
- Awards: Order of Canada

Henry Saxe OC RCA (born September 24, 1937) is a Canadian artist who creates sculpture, painting and drawing.

== Career ==
Born in Montreal, Quebec, Saxe attended Sir George Williams University (1955–1956) and the École des Beaux-Arts de Montréal (1956–1961), then studied printmaking with Albert Dumouchel (1960–1961). Saxe made his first sculpture in 1965. He continued printmaking in London (1967–1968). He taught at the École des beaux-arts de Montréal (1968–1969) and at the École des arts visuels de l'Université Laval (1970–1973). His work has been presented in numerous solo and group exhibitions, including at the Biennale de Paris in 1963 and 1968, as well as the Cent jours d’art contemporain de Montréal, in 1985. In 1994, a retrospective of his work (1960–1993) was held at the Musée d'art contemporain de Montréal. In 2007, he had a show titled Henry Saxe, The Anarchy of Space at the Freedman Gallery at Albright College, Reading, Pennsylvania, curated by Christopher Youngs. In 2019, he had a show titled Henry Saxe Sculpture and Drawings at the Galerie d'art du Centre culturel de l'Université de Sherbrooke. From 1965 on, his practice has undergone changes from modular sculptures to sculpture made from familiar materials used in installations to sculpture made from lighter materials.

His sculptures may be situated outside public institutions, such as Dex (1977) which is on a lot adjacent to the Musée de Lachine, and stretches horizontally, near ground level. Other works are in the National Gallery of Canada and Musée d’art contemporain, Montreal.

He was made a member of the Royal Canadian Academy of Arts. In 1978, along with Ron Martin, he represented Canada at the Venice Biennale. In 1979, he was awarded the Canada Council's Victor Martyn Lynch-Staunton Award. In 1988, he was made an Officer of the Order of Canada for "his own unconventional works" which have "left an indelible imprint on Canadian sculpture". In 1994, he was awarded the Government of Quebec's Prix Paul-Émile-Borduas.

Saxe has lived and worked in Tamworth, Ontario, north of Kingston, since 1973.
