= Perceptual art =

Form of art

Perceptual art is a form of art that can trace its roots to the art history concepts of perceptualism as well as to twentieth century inventions of conceptual art and performance art.

== Perceptualism ==
The concept of perceptualism has been discussed in historical and philosophical explorations of art and psychology, thus it forms an innate relationship between the artist and philosopher. Norman Bryson discussed perceptualism in terms of optical truth, as opposed to constructivist interpretations that take into account the social values of any given era's zeitgeist. Ernst Gombrich discussed perceptualism in terms of universal perceptual and psychological responses that govern the reception of images across time and differences in culture. Jack Chambers discussed perceptualism, which he first called "Perceptual Realism," in terms of visual art that is a "profound reflection of primary sensory experience, not simply a reproduction of it."

== Practice ==
In practice, perceptual art may be interpreted as the engagement of multi-sensory experiential stimuli combined with the multiplicity of interpretive meanings on the part of an observer. Sometimes, the role of observer is obscured as members of the public may unwittingly or unknowingly be participants in the creation of the artwork itself.

== Examples ==
In the late 20th century, visual artists such as Robert Smithson, with his massive land-based creation entitled Spiral Jetty, began to break down barriers between art medium and subjective interpretation. Christo and Jeanne-Claude's wrapping of the Reichstag was another milestone in this succession. Jack Chambers used "sense combinations [to] complement one another to enrich perception" in paintings such as 401 Towards London No. 1. Andy Kaufman utilized television as his primary medium in the 1980s, creating intentionally unusual and sometimes confrontational situations that left viewers unsure of their nature and meaning (Sometimes Kaufman's intentions were even undisclosed to fellow performers). A new generation of artists have continued stretching definitions and boundaries between performance, intent and meaning, such as Karen Finley, whose controversial performances were criticized by a U.S. senator, Joey Skaggs, who creates artificial news stories that are often reprinted by major media outlets, and Paul Rebhan who charges a fee for his friendship, smuggles his own paintings into museums, and hosts dating events where no one is allowed to speak.

== Sources ==
- Cheetham, Mark. Jack Chambers: Life & Work. Toronto: Art Canada Institute, 2013. E-Book.
- Clayton, Richard, Anti-realism and Scepticism, Realism and Common Sense retrieved July 17, 2007
- Chandler, Daniel, Visual Perception 3 retrieved July 17, 2007
- Christo and Jeanne Claude: The Art of Christo and Jeanne-Claude retrieved July 17, 2007
- karenfinly.net defunct July 17, 2007, see also: karenfinley.com retrieved July 17, 2007
- JOEY SKAGGS retrieved July 17, 2007
- Rebfile.com - portal to the projects of Paul Rebhan retrieved July 17, 2007
