= Murray Favro =

Canadian sculptor

- Born: Murray Favro; December 24, 1940 (age 85); Huntsville, Ontario, Canada
- Education: H.B. Beal Technical and Commercial School
- Known for: Sculptor
- Movement: London Regionalism

Murray Favro RCA (born December 24, 1940) is a Canadian sculptor who lives in London, Ontario. His work that includes drawing, sculpture, performance and installation, often incorporating slide and film projections, lighting effects, computer and electronic technology. He is associated with London Regionalism.

== Life and work ==
Favro's work deals with the nature of perception, reality and art itself, as well as with the insistent presence of the machine environment. He is an important figure among a significant generation of artists – Jack Chambers, Greg Curnoe, and Ron Martin among them – who became active in that city in the early 1960s and drew national attention as the London Regional School of artists. He is also well known as a founding member of the Nihilist Spasm Band.

As a teenager he moved to London where, from 1958 to 1962, he studied at H.B. Beal Technical and Commercial School, after which he enrolled in the specialized art classes offered at Beal (at the time, one of the few training schools for artists in Canada). Early on, he showed an interest in machines of all kinds, an interest that was encouraged by an uncle who was a tinkerer and inventor.

Favro began his career painting brightly coloured works on masonite. A Canada Council Arts Bursary in 1970 allowed him to devote himself to quit painting to pursue his other interests – guitars, machines, airplanes, and experiments with film images and inventions. That year he developed his first successful "projected reconstruction", in which images on a slide are projected onto their wooden, white, life-sized counterparts, giving them colour, detail and identity.

The formative years of Favro's practice in the 1960s were marked by a growing desire to collapse the boundaries between art and life. In contrast to Andy Warhol's Factory led the American Pop Art movement of the period, Favro resisted the mass-produced image and object. He was determined instead to build, even replicate, his own 'things' from the materials at hand, repurposing the readymade and reasserting the relationship between object and maker.

Significant works over the course of his eclectic career include "projected paintings" such as Country Road (1971–1972), Synthetic Lake (1972–1973) and Van Gogh’s Room (1973–1974), reconstructions such as Sunlight on Table and Floor (1990) and Hydro Pole (1995–1996), and a series of drawings and mechanically-improvised constructions of flying machines, their parts and hand tools, that include Sabre Jet, 55% Size (1979–1983) and Air Compressor and Turbine (1996–1997).

Favro's work has been acquired for numerous public galleries and countless private collections across Canada, and has twice been the focus of comprehensive exhibitions, organized by the Art Gallery of Ontario (1983) and collaboratively by the former London Regional Art and Historical Museums and the McIntosh Gallery (1998), University of Western Ontario. In 1977, he received the Victor Martyn Lynch-Staunton Award (1987). In 1997, he received the Gershon Iskowitz Award for career achievement. He is a 2007 recipient of the Governor General's Award in Visual and Media Arts. He is a member of the Royal Canadian Academy of Arts.

Favro is represented by the Christopher Cutts Gallery in Toronto.
