= Canadian Artists' Representation =

Canadian non-profit corporation

CARFAC
- Canadian Artists' Representation/Le Front des artistes canadiens
- Founded: 1967
- Headquarters: Ottawa, Ontario
- Location: Canada
- Members: 4,000+
- Website: www.carfac.ca

Canadian Artists' Representation/Le Front des artistes canadiens (CARFAC) is a non-profit corporation that serves as the national voice of Canada's professional visual artists.

The mandate of CARFAC is to promote the visual arts in Canada, to promote a socio-economic climate that is conducive to the production of visual arts in Canada, and to conduct research and engage in public education for these purposes.

The organization's active involvement in advocacy, lobbying, research and public education on behalf of artists in Canada has defined CARFAC as an integral representative body for artists across the country.

CARFAC was established by artists in 1968 and has been certified by the federal Status of the Artist legislation. CARFAC is guided by an active Board, elected by the membership.

== Jack Chambers and the foundation of CARFAC ==
In the early fall of 1967, the National Gallery of Canada wrote to many Canadian artists regarding the compilation of 2000 slides for a documentation library for the gallery using slides of the exhibit "300 Years of Canadian Art". The letters requested the artist's permission to reproduce their artwork in slide images; however, the letters also indicated that if the artist's permission was not received in time, the project would continue with their assumed support.

The letters implied that it was unnecessary for the artists to ask for royalty fees for the reproduction of their work because the project was educational in nature. This was a common claim used by galleries throughout the country in order to reproduce artists' works without having to pay to do so.

Jack Chambers, a painter from London, Ontario, received one of these letters and replied to the National Gallery of Canada with a request for fair treatment for the artists. Jack Chambers advocated that it was absurd to exclude artists from payment for their work and the reproduction of it within an economic climate where it is socially acknowledged that payment is granted for services rendered. He pointed out that the gallery would make a profit from the reproduction of his work, even as an educational product, and thus asked to be compensated for his work. He sent his reply the National Gallery and forwarded his reply to 130 Canadian artists who also participated in the exhibit, encouraging them to reply in kind.

Because of the pressure from the artist's letters, the slide project was cancelled. Also from the letters, the foundations of CARFAC began to emerge.

Jack Chambers remained heavily involved in CARFAC during its formative years. However, on April 13, 1978 Jack Chambers died from Leukemia. In tribute to the organization's founder, the Jack Chambers Memorial Foundation for Research and Educational Development Projects to Benefit Canadian Visual Artists was formed.

== The origin of Canadian artists' fees ==
In 1968 Canadian Artists' Representation (CAR) was officially founded. Spearheaded by Jack Chambers as National Representative, the collective of artists began to demand the recognition of artists' copyright.

CAR began issuing minimum Copyright Fee Schedules which suggested how much artists should be paid when their art is exhibited or reproduced. The first suggested fee schedule was sent around to galleries in 1968. Previous to that, most galleries in Canada did not pay rental exhibition fees to the artists at all.

According to Jack Chambers in several interviews, the first fee schedule was met with great disbelief and hostility. Immediately, some galleries supported artists' rights and began paying fees but there were many who refused to abide by the CAR fee schedule. However, as a result of CAR's announcement in its newsletter in 1971 that its members would boycott all non-fee paying galleries, more galleries began paying fees to artists.

== CARFAC's role in amending Canadian copyright legislation ==
CARFAC was instrumental in the creation of artist-centered copyright legislation.

In 1988 CARFAC's lobbying with other similar arts organizations resulted in an amendment to the Canadian Copyright Act (R.S., 1985, c. C-42). The amendment recognized artists as the primary producers of culture, and gave artists legal entitlement to exhibition and other fees.

In 1990, once the amendments to the Copyright Act were approved, the Canadian Artists' Representation Copyright Collective (CARCC) was established as a subsidiary organization of CARFAC. It serves as a copyright collective to license and administer copyright for visual and media artists in Canada.

== CARFAC and the exhibition right ==
CARFAC has worked to achieve the Exhibition Right for all visual artists in Canada. The Exhibition Right is the right for artists to present a work of visual art other than a map, chart, or plan at a public exhibition, for a purpose other than for sale or hire. CARFAC defends of the rights of artists to be paid to exhibit their works publicly rather than being forced to exhibit without pay if they desire exposure.

== CARFAC membership ==
The CARFAC voting membership includes practicing professional artists. The non-voting associate members include students, museums and art galleries, educational institutions, and other individuals and institutions with an interest in the visual arts.
