= H. B. Beal Secondary School =

High school in London, Ontario

H.B. Beal Secondary School
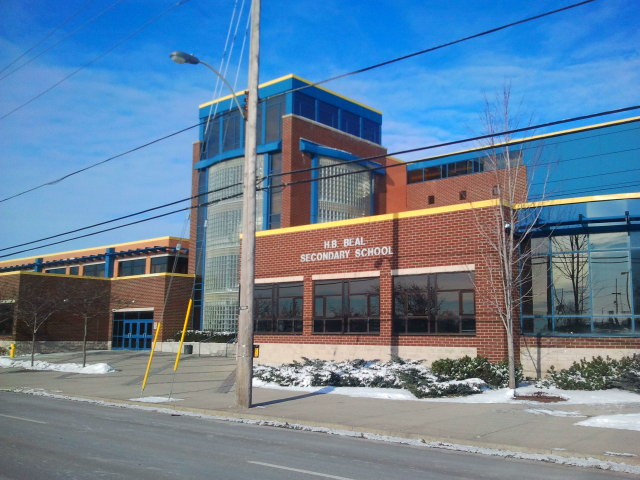

Location
- 525 Dundas Street; London, Ontario, N6B 1W5; Canada; 42.9872°N 81.2347°W

Information
- School type: High School
- Motto: Integrity, Loyalty, Industry (Industry, Loyalty, Integrity)
- Founded: February 29, 1912; 114 years ago
- School board: Thames Valley District School Board
- Superintendent: Sheila Builder
- Principal: Ian Charlton
- Grades: 9 to 12
- Enrollment: 1,522 (January 15th, 2025)
- Language: English
- Colours: Blue and Gold
- Team name: Raiders
- Website: beal.tvdsb.ca/en/index.aspx

H.B. Beal Secondary School is a high school in London, Ontario. It is named after Herbert Benson Beal, the founder and first principal of the school. H.B. Beal is the second largest school in Thames Valley District School Board with almost 2,000 students currently enrolled as of 2019/20. The school property sits on almost two whole city blocks in downtown London. The actual building sits on one, while the other block is used for parking and athletics, including a football field and a track.

== General school description and history ==
In 1911, Beal recognized the need for a program of technical education that would reflect the emerging needs of society. The London Industrial School opened its doors in 1912 and began offering both day and night programs. Demand was growing rapidly and in 1918, students began moving to a new school building. After many additions and increased program demands, it was decided to completely renovate Beal so that it could continue to be a leader in the field of education.

After a 52 million dollar renovation, (one of the most expensive school renovations in Canadian history), the official opening of "The New Beal" took place in June 1999. Beal now offers approximately 250 courses and 18 Cooperative Education courses.

== Bealart ==
Bealart has ten separate fully equipped studio facilities, which are augmented by a computer lab, art library, and courses in art history and drawing. Developed by practising artists, the program provides professional instruction with a hands-on approach.

The foundation programs are offered as half day or full-day courses. Programs are available as one-year foundations program and two-year specialized program. The programs provide students the opportunity to immerse themselves in an intensive, studio based experience.

=== Studios ===
- Painting (Acrylic, Oil, Encaustic, Watercolour, Gouache)
- Printmaking (Intaglio) (Etching, Drypoint, Lino, Serigraphy, papermaking and book binding)
- Printmaking (Lithography) (Reduction, Photocopy Transfer, CMYK colour separation)
- Sculpture (3-D) (Linear, Form, Assemblage, Casting, Planar, functional and non functional forms)
- Ceramics (slab work, pinch pots, coil forms, wheel work, tile, functional and non functional forms)
- Photography (35mm, medium format, digital, studio and darkroom)
- Film (video production, final cut pro, film criticism)
- Animation (Classical Animation techniques and character design)
- Textiles (Weaving, felting, knitting, silk painting, embellishing, silk screening)
- Commercial Design (advertising, illustration, digital design, Photoshop, Illustrator)
- Technology (camera design, illustration, designing logos)

Although not official studios, these two disciplines are mandatory with all BealArt programs. One day a week is spent divided between the two of them. They are:

- Drawing (Observational, analytical, expressive and figure drawing)
- Art History (Art criticism, overview of prehistoric art to present)

== Course offerings ==
H.B. Beal Secondary School offers a variety of classes that virtually encompass all the academic disciplines, including but not limited to: Arts, Business, Canadian and World Studies, Co-op Education, English and Literature, ESL/ELD, Modern Languages, Technology, Social Sciences and Humanities, Science, and Mathematics.

== Specialist High Skill Majors (SHSM) at Beal ==
SHSMs are ministry-approved specialized programs that allow students to focus their learning on a specific economic sector while meeting the requirements for the Ontario Secondary School Diploma and assists in their transition from secondary school to apprenticeship training, college, university, or the workplace. Successful completion of the SHSM program will be recognized on the OSSD and Ontario Student Transcript. Beal offers training and preparation in the following programs:

- Arts and Culture (Bealart or Fashion, Hairstyling and Aesthetics focus)
- Construction
- Information and Communications Technology
- Manufacturing
- Non-Profit
- Sports

== Arts ==
Beal Television is an "Airing Twice a Week" YouTube live-stream show that highlights topics of interest to the school community and the upcoming events, mixed in with PSAs made by the anchors of the Student Body for that semester.

The original name for the program was "Broadcast Beal," it was then changed in 2005–2006 to Channel 2 news and in 2006–2007 to B Channel News and to The Raider Report in 2007–2008 then changed to BTV in 2008–2009. In 2016, the program was rebranded once again to Beal News Network (BNN), but returned to the name BTV as of 2018, but to be changed back to BNN in 2019. In 2020, the program's name was returned back to BTV (Beal Television) and stays as such today.

The Beal Innovates program began in 2015 as a four-credit all day program running first semester, covering English, Science, Geography, and Mathematics through a project and inquiry-based approach. The success of this program led to an expansion of interdisciplinary study courses beginning in the 2019–2020 year, including The Chemistry of Biology (12U Biology and Chemistry), Physimatics (11U Physics and Mathematics), and Page to Stage (10D/P English and Drama.)

The Bealart Year End show is an opportunity for students to showcase their talents.

There is an annual end-of-year concert that highlights students' accomplishments through both group and individual performances from the jazz and concert bands, guitar ensemble, recording groups, and choir.

The dance program also showcases their talents in a public performance at the end of each semester. Beal offers Dance from Grades 9–12 with each class studying Jazz, Ballet and Modern dance. Guest artists are often brought into the school to allow dancers to participate in enrichment pieces such as Hip-Hop and Contemporary dance.

Beal Musical Theatre is a 3 credit program that involves vocal music, dance and dramatic arts. Students are accepted into the program after a successful audition. The program used to run in a 3-year cycle, running for two years in a row, and taking the third year off. Now the school puts on a show every year, following the pattern minor, major, minor, major in their show choices. The program has produced the following shows:

- The Devil wears Prada (2001)
- Footloose (2002)
- Les Misérables (2003)
- Children of Eden (2005)
- Beauty and the Beast (2006)
- All Shook Up (2008)
- Into the Woods (2009)
- Fame (2010)
- The Phantom of the Opera (2011)
- Hairspray (2012)
- Once on this Island (2013)
- The Music Man (2014)
- West Side Story (2015)
- Mary Poppins (2016)
- Pippin (2017)
- Shrek (2018)
- A Chorus Line (2019)
- The Theory of Relativity (2022)
- Mamma Mia! (2023)
- Newsies (2024)
- Hadestown (2025)
- Chicago (2026)

In 2009, Beal was granted a specialized program in performing arts by the Thames Valley District School Board called the Specialist High Skills Major (SHSM). Students who are accepted into the program are required to take specific courses so when they graduate they receive a special seal on their diploma saying they majored in Performing Arts in high school. The school now holds an annual gala to thank their many sponsors for their generosity.

The H. B. Beal student council is also highly involved in the school and the community with such events as the S.C.R.O.O.G.E Campaign, which is a canned food drive that benefits the Salvation Army. In 2008, the staff and students collected over 8000 cans for those in need.

On the evening of January 12, 2012, a celebration gala was held to celebrate the 100th anniversary of the school. London mayor Joe Fontana, MP Susan Truppe, and MPP Deb Matthews were in attendance, speaking to an audience of about 1,000. A performance by students from the school's Musical Theatre followed.

== Notable alumni ==
- Philip Aziz, artist
- Marc Bell, artist/cartoonist
- Jack Chambers, artist and filmmaker
- Frank Colman, Major League Baseball outfielder
- Greg Curnoe, artist
- Murray Favro, artist
- Paul Haggis, television screenwriter, director and producer
- Tommy Hunter, musician and entertainer
- John R. Little, author
- Lido Pimienta, musician
- Olivia Scriven, actress
- Shaedon Sharpe, basketball player
- Kendra Timmins, actress
- Brad Turner, film and television director
- Shannon Walsh, film director and producer
- Rich Williamson, filmmaker
- Jessie Fleming, pro soccer player for the Portland Thorns and Canwnt/Canxnt
- Myfanwy MacLeod, Canadian artist

== See also ==
- Education in Ontario
- List of secondary schools in Ontario
