= Greg Curnoe =

Canadian painter (1936–1992)

- Self Portrait #4 (1992). watercolour, stamp pad ink, blue print pencil, pencil on paper. 12 × 9 in.
- Born: Gregory Richard Curnoe; 19 November 1936; London, Ontario, Canada
- Died: 14 November 1992 (aged 55); Delaware, Ontario
- Education: Beal Technical School, Doon School of Art, Ontario College of Art
- Known for: Painter
- Movement: London Regionalism

Greg Curnoe (19 November 1936 – 14 November 1992) was a Canadian painter known for his role in the Canadian art movement labeled London Regionalism, which, beginning in the 1960s, made London, Ontario, an important centre for artistic production in Canada. While his oeuvre chronicled his daily experience in a variety of media, it was grounded in twentieth-century art movements, especially Dada, with its emphasis on nihilism and anarchism, Canadian politics, and popular culture. He is remembered for brightly coloured works that often incorporate text to support his strong Canadian patriotism, sometimes expressed as anti-Americanism, as well as his activism in support of Canadian artists.

== Early life ==
Gregory Richard Curnoe was born on 19 November 1936, at Victoria Hospital in London, Ontario. He grew up with his parents, Nellie Olive (née Porter) and Gordon Charles Curnoe; his brother, Glen (born 1939); and his sister, Lynda (born 1943), in a house built for the family by his grandfather. For most of his life, Curnoe lived within five kilometres of this home in Southwestern Ontario, a peninsula surrounded by water and the United States. Curnoe attended H. B. Beal Secondary School (1954–1956) and the Doon School of Art (1956) before attending the Ontario College of Art (1957–1960), where he failed his final year.

== Career ==
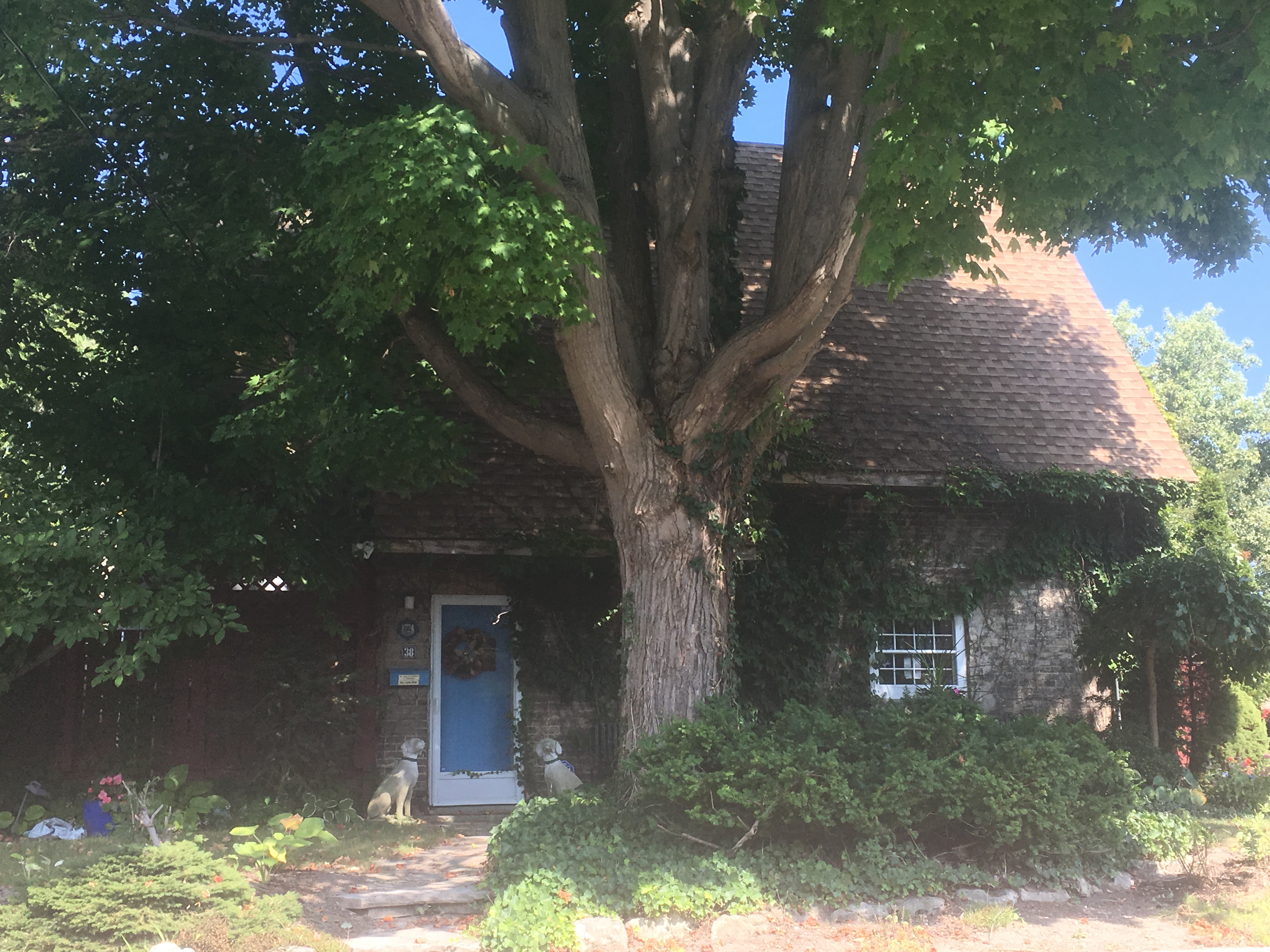
Curnoe Property, Weston Street, London, Ontario

Returning to London, Ontario, Curnoe began to work in the studio. He found meaning in popular culture and his own cultural roots that addressed the disillusion he felt with established culture after leaving art school. He founded Region magazine in 1961 and Region Gallery in 1962. He co-founded the Canadian noise band the Nihilist Spasm Band in 1965. In 1968, Jack Chambers with the aid of Kim Ondaatje, Tony Urquhart, Curnoe and John Boyle, founded Canadian Artists' Representation to serve as a union for artists in Canada. Curnoe co-founded the Forest City Gallery, an artist-run centre, in 1973. He represented Canada at the Venice Biennale in 1976 and was the subject of a retrospective exhibition at the Montreal Museum of Fine Arts in 1981, which subsequently toured across Canada.

== Death ==
While out on a Saturday club ride with the London Centennial Wheelers, Curnoe was killed by a distracted driver in a pickup truck that plowed into the group of seven cyclists on Highway 2, just outside Delaware, Ontario on 14 November 1992. He was killed and six others were seriously injured and taken to hospital. The driver was charged with four-counts of dangerous driving causing bodily harm, and one-count of dangerous driving causing death. In provincial court, the driver was eventually acquitted of all charges on 13 January 1994.

== See also ==
- Dorothy Haines Hoover
