= Jack Chambers (artist) =

Canadian artist and filmmaker (1931–1978)

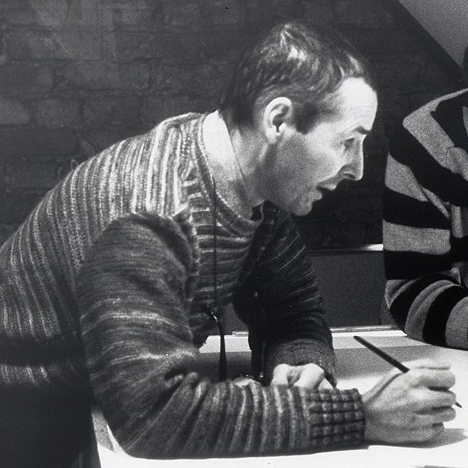
- Chambers in 1978
- Born: John Richard Chambers; March 25, 1931; London, Ontario, Canada
- Died: April 13, 1978 (aged 47); London, Ontario, Canada
- Known for: Painter, filmmaker
- Notable work: The Hart of London, 1970
- Spouse: Olga Sanchez Bustos (married 1963)

John Richard Chambers RCA (March 25, 1931 – April 13, 1978) was an artist and filmmaker. Born in London, Ontario, Chambers' painting style shifted from surrealist-influenced to photo-realist-influenced. He used the term "Perceptual Realism" and later "perceptualism" to describe his style. He began working with film in the 1960s, completing six by 1970. Stan Brakhage proclaimed Chambers' The Hart of London as "one of the greatest films ever made."

== Biography ==
Born John Richard Chambers in London, Ontario, Chambers signed his name as John until 1970 and thereafter was known as Jack professionally and posthumously. Chambers studied at Sir Adam Beck Collegiate Institute in London, where in 1944 he was taught by the painter Selwyn Dewdney. He later attended H.B. Beal Secondary School and the University of Western Ontario, before spending eight years (1953–1961) studying and working in Europe. While in Europe he met Pablo Picasso, turning up at the artist's house and scaling his gate in order to introduce himself. Picasso suggested he continue his studies in Barcelona. He called his own work "perceptual realism," a kind of surrealism based on his own dreams and memories and the existentialist philosophy of Maurice Merleau-Ponty. When he returned to London, Chambers worked with fellow London native Greg Curnoe. In 1969 he was diagnosed with leukemia. For the rest of his life he painted more realistically, often depicting sites in London and the surrounding area. An example of this is 401 Towards London No. 1 (1968–1969), a view of Highway 401 heading westward towards London.

In 1968, he founded Canadian Artists' Representation (CARFAC), now a national organization of artists, after an argument with the National Gallery of Canada over reproduction rights and fees. In 1973 he received the Victor Martyn Lynch-Staunton Award.

His work is in the collections of the National Gallery of Canada, the Art Gallery of Ontario, and Museum London. An elementary school Jack Chambers Public School (and the streets surrounding it) are named for him in London, and a tree was planted in his memory in Gibbons Park after his death.

The 2012 retrospective of his work at the Art Gallery of Ontario has helped introduce his oeuvre to a new audience.

== Perceptual Realism ==
Chambers evolved his theory of Perceptual Realism in the late 1960s in an essay of the same name. He argued for different types of realism and believed that his approach was unique. Art historian Mark Cheetham calls it "a fully articulated position that detailed art’s profound and spiritual relationship with primary sensory experience" and applies to his most notable films and paintings. Perceptual Realism showed the essence of matter through light and material. Chambers called it "a faculty of inner vision where the object appears in the splendour of its essential namelessness.

== Paintings ==
The foundations of Chambers' painting technique were laid during his training in Spain. Many of his paintings from that period show the influence of Surrealism. After his return to Canada in 1961 he experimented with paint application and vibrant colour. By the mid-1960s, his style changed again as he worked a sense of temporal movement into his paintings. Forms were fragmented in these paintings: "A painting gets put together just like an experience – in particles." In the mid-1960s, Chambers also produced his silver paintings using aluminum pigment. Other artists, including Andy Warhol, also experimented with this unusual metallic colour.

== Films ==
Between 1964 and 1970, Chambers completed six films varying in length between nine minutes and 79 minutes. Working in both black and white and colour film, his works were montages dealing on the surface with his domestic life and images of London, Ontario. They were also examinations of the contrast between nature and society. Although for the most part peripheral to the history of avant-garde film, owing to his early death and reluctance to travel with his films for festivals, Chambers' filmography and in particular his feature-length film The Hart of London have become important within Canadian film history but have also grown in stature internationally.

=== Filmography ===
- Mosaic (1964–1965, black and white, sound, 9 min.)
- Hybrid (1966, colour, silent, 15 min.)
- Little Red Riding Hood (with Greg Curnoe and James Reaney) (1967, colour, sound, 25 min.)
- R-34 (1967, colour, sound, 30 min.)
- Circle (1968–1969, colour/black and white, sound, 28 min.)
- The Hart of London (1968–1970, colour/black and white, sound, 79 min.)
- C.C.C.I. (unfinished) (c.1970)
- Life Still (unfinished) (c.1970)

Films About Jack Chambers

- Chambers (Fraser Boa, 1969, col., so., 41 min.)
- Jack Chambers (Cynthia Scott, CBC 'Man Alive' program, 1971, col., so., 52 min(?)
- Life Force (Peter Mellen, 1974, col., so., 26 min.)
- Chambers: Tracks and Gestures (Christopher Lowry and John Walker, 1982, col., so., 57 min.) (DVD Ecotone Productions)
