= Museum London =

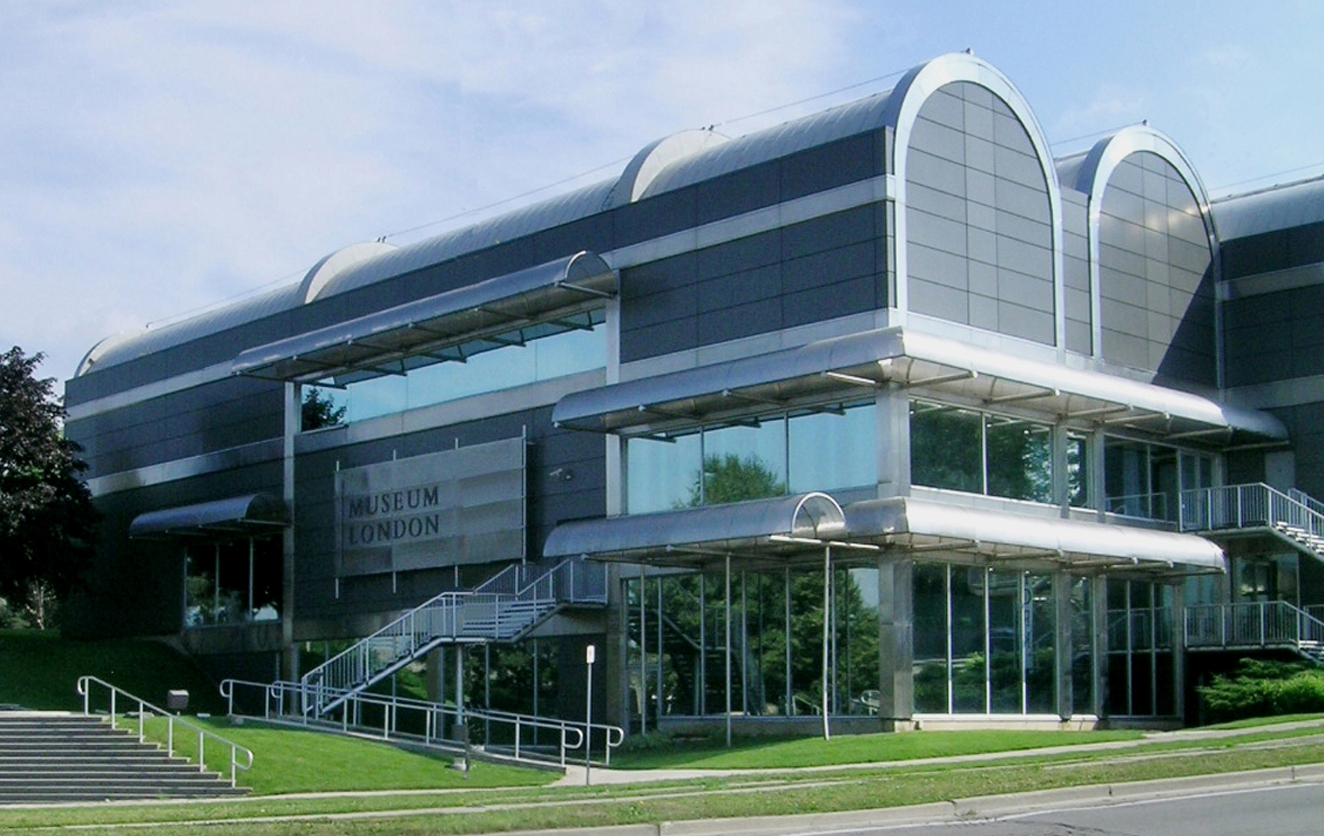
- Established: 1940
- Location: 421 Ridout Street North; London, Ontario; N6A 5H4
- Coordinates: 42.9826°N 81.2551°W
- Type: Art and history museum
- Director: Julie Bevan
- Curator: Andrew Kear
- Website: www.museumlondon.ca

Museum London is an art and history museum located in London, Ontario, Canada. It is located near the forks of the Thames River. It started its operations in 1940 with London Public Library and amalgamated with London Regional Art Gallery and London Regional Historical Museum in 1989. The current building is designed by Raymond Moriyama, architect of Science North in Greater Sudbury, the Bata Shoe Museum in Toronto, and the National Museum of Saudi Arabia in Riyadh.

== History ==
In 2018, the museum opened an expansion to the museum called Centre at the Forks.

== Collection ==
The museum's collection contains 45,000 artifacts and 5,000 pieces of art. The museum's art collection includes works by Lawren Harris, one of the founders of the Group of Seven, Kent Monkman, and Edward Burtynsky. In 2004, the London Health Sciences Centre gave the museum its medical artifact collection.
