= Quentin VerCetty =

Canadian Afrofuturist artist and sculptor

Quentin VerCetty (born Quentin Lindsay) is a Canadian visual artist, educator, and sculptor known for his work in Afrofuturism and public art. He has created sculptures and public artworks that address the underrepresentation of Black Canadian historical figures.

== Early life and education ==
VerCetty was born and raised in Rexdale, Etobicoke, Toronto, and attended Greenholme Junior Middle School and Lincoln M. Alexander Secondary School in Malton, Ontario. His mother Herfa Lindsay, a Jamaican immigrant, played a significant role in his early education, teaching him computer programming and animation. She introduced him to the story of Joshua Glover when he was six or seven years old, which would later become central to his artistic work.

His early years were marked by challenges, including involvement with street life and multiple encounters with police. He dropped out of high school at age 16 and was sent to New York by his mother in hopes of a fresh start, though he was eventually asked to leave that school as well.

Upon returning to Toronto, VerCetty enrolled at Nelson A. Boylen Collegiate Institute, where a guidance counselor encouraged him to pursue scholarships and bursaries for post-secondary education. He received several awards, including a 2010 bursary from the Toronto Police 31 Division Community Police Liaison Committee, which he described as a turning point in recognizing that his community cared about young people.

VerCetty completed his Bachelor of Fine Arts at OCAD University in 2016, where he first began working on sculpture during an exchange program in Florence. He later pursued a Master's degree in Art Education at Concordia University.

== Artistic practice ==
VerCetty describes himself as a visual griot, storyteller, and educator whose work centers on Afrofuturism—a creative approach that combines African history, culture, and futuristic or speculative elements. The focus of his work centers on the absence of representation of Black Canadians in public art, and zeroes-in on the lack of monuments commemorating people of African descent. VerCetty has conducted research revealing that there are only approximately 20 monuments to Black Canadians across the country, with only two Black Canadian artists having created these works—VerCetty being one of them.

In 2016, he co-founded and became director of the Black Speculative Arts Movement Canada, an organization that uses second-wave Afrofuturism to provide new perspectives on reimagining public spaces. His project "Missing Black Technofossil Here" uses augmented reality, digital 3D art, and printing to address the absence of monuments to Black bodies in Toronto and across Canada.

== Selected works ==
Step Forward Into History (Joshua Glover Memorial) – In 2020, VerCetty received a public art competition to design a memorial sculpture of Joshua Glover, an abolitionist who escaped slavery in the United States and settled in Etobicoke in 1854. The selection panel, which included Julie Crooks from the Art Gallery of Ontario and Gaëtane Verna from the Power Plant.

The bronze sculpture, titled Step Forward Into History, depicts Glover as a Victorian gentleman with a cyborg arm, symbolizing his breaking free from the chains of slavery through an Afrofuturist lens. VerCetty explained that the cyborg element represents Glover's transformation from being enslaved to reclaiming his humanity, while he clutches books and freedom papers as he gazes toward the future.

In 2021, the memorial was installed at Joshua Glover Park in Etobicoke as part of the City of Toronto's ArtworxTO: Toronto's Year of Public Art initiative. This was the first monument in Toronto to commemorate a person of African descent.

Ancestral Uprising – Also in 2021, VerCetty created Ancestral Uprising, an augmented reality installation that can be viewed anywhere in Toronto using a smartphone. The piece features a reimagined Black power fist with a golden base representing the value of Black life and purple hibiscus flowers symbolizing healing and royalty. The work includes patterns from the Ndebele people of South Africa and was created in consultation with Black and Indigenous elders.

AfroSankofa – In 2022, VerCetty was commissioned by Carnegie Hall to create AstroSankofa for the 2022 Afrofuturism festival. The piece pays tribute to Madame Sissieretta Jones, the first person of African descent to headline at Carnegie Hall, and incorporates references to various icons including Sun Ra, Earth, Wind & Fire, and Mae Jemison.

Lucie and Thornton Blackburn Portrait – In 2023, VerCetty was commissioned by Parks Canada to create a portrait of Lucie Blackburn and Thornton Blackburn. The portrait commemorates the Blackburns’ contributions as freedom seekers and entrepreneurs in Toronto’s early history.

Lincoln Alexander Bust (Suited for Greatness) – In 2024, VerCetty was commissioned to create a bust of Lincoln Alexander, Canada's first Black member of Parliament and Ontario's first Black lieutenant governor. The sculpture was unveiled at Queen's Park on January 21, 2024—Lincoln Alexander Day—making it the first monument of a Black political figure to be displayed in any parliamentary setting in Canada.

The bust, nicknamed Suited for Greatness, was inspired by Alexander's personal motto: "Every day I wake up and I suit up to be greater than I had been before." VerCetty drew from his personal connection to Alexander, having attended Lincoln M. Alexander Secondary School and briefly meeting Alexander as a student when the statesman told him, "I see great things in you."

The sculpture incorporates Afrofuturist elements and science fiction elements, including a base inspired by spaceships from Star Wars. The project was supported by the Black Opportunity Fund, Licensed to Learn, and the RBC Foundation.

Gait of Rexdale – VerCetty created Gait of Rexdale, a permanent bronze public sculpture commissioned by Woodbine Entertainment Group and installed in the Rexdale area of Toronto.

Exploring the Heart – Exploring the Heart is a 2.7-metre mixed-media public sculpture by VerCetty installed along Eglinton Avenue West in Toronto. Commissioned by The Eglinton Way Business Improvement Area in partnership with the City of Toronto, the aluminum and cement work depicts a figure emerging from a geometric form and references the architectural history and cultural legacy of the surrounding neighbourhood.

== Scholarly and editorial works ==
VerCetty served as an editor of Cosmic Underground Northside: An Incantation of Black Canadian Speculative Discourse & Innerstandings, an anthology of Black Canadian speculative art, literature, and visual culture published in 2020. The volume brings together contributions from Black Canadian writers and artists across multiple generations and disciplines.

In 2022, VerCetty published the peer-reviewed article "Parable of Museum Learning: Activating Afrofuturistic A-R-Tography Approaches" in the Journal of Museum Education. The article examines Afrofuturism in relation to museum education, public engagement, and art-based pedagogical practices.

== Awards and honors ==
In 2010, VerCetty received the Governor General's Bronze Medal for Academic Excellence, awarded annually to the graduating student with the highest academic standing at participating Canadian secondary institutions.

In 2020, VerCetty was selected as part of the Monument Lab Fellowship program based in Philadelphia, becoming the only Canadian among ten "memory workers" in the cohort. Monument Lab is an organization that supports projects addressing long-term inequities in monument building and proposing new approaches to public art and history.

VerCetty has worked as an educator at the Art Gallery of Ontario for over five years and has collaborated with the Goethe-Institut on transnational exhibitions exploring monuments, public memory, and accessibility.

== Parliamentary recognition ==
VerCetty has been formally recognized in the House of Commons of Canada. In 2021, then-Member of Parliament Kirsty Duncan (representing the riding of Etobicoke North) acknowledged his contributions to public art, education, and Black Canadian representation, with reference to his Joshua Glover memorial and international artistic work.

== Influences and legacy ==
VerCetty cites his paternal grandfather, Rupert Jeeper, who died in 2006, as a major influence on his life and artistic practice. He also draws inspiration from his great-grandfather, who was a blacksmith in Clarendon, Jamaica, and from Jamaican sculptor Basil Watson.

His work addresses what scholars have identified as systemic gaps in Canadian public commemoration. As noted in commentary about his Joshua Glover memorial, the monument landscape in Canada has historically been "overwhelmingly white and male," with Black women historical figures particularly underrepresented.

VerCetty has stated that he hopes his work opens doors for other artists and inspires communities to consider which other Black Canadian leaders and historical figures deserve recognition in public spaces. His approach combines rigorous historical research with speculative and futuristic elements, aiming to create monuments that engage multiple generations and spark ongoing conversations about history, identity, and social justice.
