= Barbara Fischer =

Canadian curator (born 1956)

- Born: Barbara Anna Elisabeth Fischer; November 4, 1956 (age 69); Karlsruhe, Germany
- Education: BFA, University of Victoria (1982); MA, York University (1999)
- Occupations: contemporary art curator, writer, educator
- Spouse: Kim Adams

Barbara Fischer (born November 4, 1956) is an art curator and writer who specializes in contemporary art in all media with an emphasis on sculpture, installation, and projection/lens-based work. She serves as the director and chief curator of the Art Museum at the University of Toronto. The Toronto Star called her the "unassuming nuclear reactor of the Toronto arts scene", adding that she is "doing seemingly impossible work that, at the same time, is both vital and otherwise neglected: building a memory bank of artistic expression in a city plagued with willful amnesia."

== Career ==
Fischer was born in Karlsruhe, Germany, the eldest of ten children and attended the Rudolf Steiner School, Bochum-Langendreer, Germany. She moved to Canada in 1976 and studied at the Banff School of Fine Arts Summer school. She received her BFA, University of Victoria (1982) and her MA from York University (1999).

Fischer changed curatorial positions every two or three years in the early part of her career. She was the curator of film and visual arts at the Open Space Gallery in Victoria, BC (1981–1983), assistant curator at the Walter Phillips Gallery, Banff, AB (1983–1985), assistant curator of contemporary Canadian and international art at the Art Gallery of Ontario, Toronto (1985–1988), and curator of contemporary art at The Power Plant, Toronto (1988–1990). From 1999 to 2002, she was the curator of the Blackwood Gallery at the University of Toronto Mississauga and its director/curator from 2002 to 2005.

She became director/curator of the Justina M. Barnicke Gallery (2005–), and then interim director at the Art Centre (2013–2014) and then executive director/chief curator leading the integration of both in the newly formed Art Museum at the University of Toronto. At the same time as her curatorial work, Fischer taught at the Ontario College of Art and Design (OCAD) in Toronto (1992–1998), at the University of Western Ontario, London, Ontario (1995–1999), and at the University of Toronto Mississauga (2000–2005), then in the Department of Art, University of Toronto (2008–) where she developed the Master of Visual Studies Program in Curatorial Studies at the John H. Daniels Faculty of Architecture, Landscape, and Design at the University of Toronto and was appointed associate professor, teaching stream in 2015.

== Curatorial work ==
Fischer has curated or co-curated roughly 100 exhibitions on contemporary art which have travelled nationally or internationally, such as the following:

- Love Gasoline (1996) traced staging of the self in the late 1960s and 1970s, drawing attention to performance of gender played out in the visual field through sculpture, video, and photo-based works;
- Logocity (2000), a major, campus-wide exhibition presented contemporary artists who use advertising and sign structures, including Ron Benner, Germaine Koh, David Kramer, Arnaud Maggs, Kelly Mark, Bernie Miller, and others, which won the 2001 Ontario Association of Art Galleries Awards "Exhibition of the Year" and the 2001 Ontario Association of Art Galleries Awards "Design Award";
- General Idea Editions 1967–1995 (2003), a retrospective of editions published by General Idea between 1967 and 1995, accompanied by a catalogue raisonné produced in collaboration with ten university and public galleries across Canada (the exhibition continues to travel in 2005 and 2006 to the Andy Warhol Museum, Pittsburgh, the Kunst-Werke ICA, Berlin, and Kunsthalle Zurich among others. The book won the 2004 Melva J. Dwyer award for exceptional reference or research tools related to Canadian art and the 2004 Ontario Association of Art Galleries "Book Design Award".
- Projections (2007), the first major survey of projection-based installations in the history of contemporary art from 1964 to 2007, in Canada. Presented in four distinct chapters, it included works by Michael Snow, Stan Douglas, Rodney Graham, Rebecca Belmore, Wyn Geleynse, Mark Lewis, Murray Favro, Genevieve Cadieux, Judy Radul, Janet Cardiff; George Bures Miller, John Massey, Ian Carr-Harris, David Hoffos, and others, presented at the Blackwood Gallery, Doris McCarthy Gallery, Justina M. Barnicke Gallery and the University of Toronto Art Centre and won the 2007 Ontario Association of Art Galleries Award "Exhibition of the Year";
- Mark Lewis, Canada Pavillion, 53rd Venice Bienniale of Contemporary Art (2009), which included a trilogy of specially commissioned works titled Cold Morning;
- Traffic: Conceptual Art in Canada 1965–1980 (2010), the first major exhibition of conceptualism in Canada, curated in collaboration with Catherine Crowston, Grant Arnold, Michèle Thériault and Vincent Bonin, and Jayne Wark, in five distinct regional chapters, and including over 100 Canadian and international artists (the exhibition travelled to the partner venues Halifax Ink, Art Gallery of Alberta, Ellen Art Gallery (Concordia University), and Vancouver Art Gallery (2011–2012) and internationally in reconfigured form to the Badischer Kunstverein, Karlsruhe and Canadian Cultural Centre, Paris). The show won the Canadian Museum Association (CMA) Award for Outstanding Achievement in Exhibitions, 2012 (2013). The Calgary Herald called the show a "spectacular achievement and a significant contribution to the history of art in Canada" and added "Every student of Canadian art, and every Canadian art student, should see it". The Toronto Star called it a "definitive history". Akimblog Toronto said it was the most "important exhibition of the year";
- Kent Monkman – Shame and Prejudice: A Story of Resilience (2017), which was a major curatorial project by Toronto based artist Kent Monkman produced in conjunction with the Sesquicentennial of Confederation. It toured nationally to eight venues and won the OAAG 2017 Exhibition of the Year Award (Budget over $50,000), the OAAG 2017 Exhibition Installation and Design Award and the Canadian Museums Association 2018 Outstanding Achievement (Exhibition). Robert Enright said the show was "the most radical rethinking of the way our society functions any artist has accomplished in the 150 years since Confederation....When you see 'Shame and Prejudice: A Story of Resilience' and actually take at face value what the exhibition is telling us, you cannot be the same person coming out as you were going in.... My projection is it will emerge as the most important exhibition organized by any Canadian museum in this anniversary year". The Guardian called it "The country's most talked about art exhibit";
- Isuma, Canadian Pavillion, 58th Venice Biennale (2019), as part of a five member team, which was a presentation of the Isuma Collective (Igloolik filmmakers Zacharias Kunuk and Norman Cohn). C Magazine said "Isuma encourages immersion here to consider not only the injustices within Inuit and Canadian relations, but the value of countering them through collaboration and Inuit self-determination".

== Writing ==
Fischer has written essays in books on the topic of contemporary curatorial practice, such as, 'Negotiations: Curatorial Practice', (in "Naming A Practice"), 'Top Ten' (in "Raising Frankenstein"), and most recently, in 'The Next 25 years: Propositions for the Future of Curatorial Studies' (in "Great Expectations: Prospects for the Future of Curatorial Education"); as well as edited and written introductions for numerous independent and exhibition-related publications such as "foodculture: Tasting Identities and Geographies in Art" (YYZ Books: 1999), "Form Follows Fiction: Art and Artists in Toronto" (Art Museum and Blackdog Press: 2020) with Luis Jacob; "Kent Monkman: Shame and Prejudice" (Art Museum and Blackdog Press: 2020) (translations to French and Cree); and "General Idea Editions 1967–1995", Catalog Raisonne. Her essays in books include "On Language in Conceptual Art', in "Conceptual Lines", proceedings from the international conference organized by the Beijing Central Academy of Fine Arts, CAFA, as well as many articles and reviews.

== Awards and honours ==
- 2001 Ontario Association of Art Galleries (OAAG) (now GOG (Galeries Ontario Galleries)) Exhibition Award ("Logo-city");
- 2001 OAAG Historical Curatorial Writing Award ("Love Gasoline");
- 2004 OAAG Exhibition Award ("soundtracks");
- 2004 Steamwhistle Award for Best Group exhibition ("Re-Play");
- 2004 Melva J. Dwyer Award for exceptional research tool relating to Canadian Art ("General Idea Editions");
- 2008 OAAG Exhibition Award ("Projections");
- 2008 Canada's Representation at the 53rd International Art Exhibition – La Biennale di Venezia. Awarded for "Mark Lewis: Cold Morning" by the Canada Council for the Arts (2009);
- 2008 Hnatyshyn Award for Curatorial Excellence in Contemporary Art:
- 2009 OAAG Colleague of the Year Award;
- 2013 CMA Outstanding Exhibition Award (co-curated exhibition “Traffic: Conceptual Art in Canada”);
- 2015 OAAG Art Publication Award ("Kelly Mark: Everything is Interesting");
- 2017 OAAG Exhibition of the Year Award (Budget over $50,000) ("Kent Monkman - Shame and Prejudice: A Story of Resilience");
- 2018 Canadian Museums Association (CMA) 2018 Outstanding Achievement ("Kent Monkman - Shame and Prejudice: A Story of Resilience");
- 2019 (co-curated exhibition "Isuma");
- 2018 Canada's Representation at the 58rd International Art Exhibition – La Biennale di Venezia;
- 2021 Chevalier de L’ordre des arts et des lettres, Ministry of Culture, France;
- 2022 President's Impact Award, University of Toronto
