= Melanie Townsend =

Art Curator and Writer

Melanie Townsend (1968 - December 19, 2018, London, Ontario, Canada) was a Canadian curator and writer on contemporary art, Head of Exhibitions at Museum London, and President of the Ontario Association of Art Galleries.

== Biography ==
Townsend was born and raised in Windsor, Ontario. She attended Kennedy Collegiate Secondary School and earned an Honours bachelor's degree from Western University in 1991. She received a master's degree in history from the University of Windsor in 1994. During her undergraduate studies, she worked as a collections assistant with Windsor's Community Museum, later working at the Art Gallery of Windsor as its Curatorial Assistant/Coordinator.

From 1998 to 2004, Townsend worked as Curator of the Walter Phillips Gallery at The Banff Centre and helped establish the Banff International Curatorial Institute. She was instrumental in partnering with Plugin Gallery in 2001 for the 49th Venice Biennale, which featured the work of Janet Cardiff and George Bures Miller. She was on the board of the Calgary artist-run centre TRUCK, and served as its President. Townsend was Secretary, Vice President, and President of the Ontario Association of Art Galleries, between 2010 and 2016. In 2004, she was appointed Curator of Contemporary Art, at Museum London and in 2005, its Head of Exhibitions and Collections.

== Exhibition history ==
At the Walter Phillips Gallery: Sentient Circuitry (2002) featuring the work of Norman White Ken Rinaldo and Reva Stone; Roy Kiyooka: Accidental Tourist (2004) and Campsites (2005). At Museum London: Garry Neill Kennedy: Superstar Shadow (2006); Wyn Geleynse: A Man Trying to Explain Pictures (2006); Gardens of a Colonial Present: Ron Benner (2008); Jamelie Hassan: At the Far Edge of Words (2009); Kim Adams: One for the Road (2013); Kim Ondaatje (2013); and Colette Urban: Incognito (2014).

== Writing ==
Townsend edited and wrote key works within the field of museology and curatorial studies including: The Paradise Institute (2001); The Edge of Everything: Reflection on Curatorial Practice (2002); Beyond the Box: Diverging Curatorial Practices (2003).
