= Blackburn Riots =

1833 civil conflict in Detroit, Michigan

- Date: June 17, 1833 – July 30, 1833
- Location: Detroit, Michigan
- Caused by: Capture of Thornton and Rutha Blackburn (Black); Escape of the Blackburns (White)
- Methods: Rioting, Assault, Arson, Gunfire, Murder
- Result: Ordnance on black residents of Detroit; Blackburns escape to Toronto

Parties
Black rioters	City of Detroit; Sheriff's Department	White rioters

Lead figures
Thornton Blackburn; Rutha Blackburn	Mayor Marshall Chapin; John M. Wilson	Mob

Number
40-400		

Casualties and losses
	1	

Casualties
- Death: At least 1
- Arrested: 29

The Blackburn riots occurred during the summer of 1833 in Detroit, Michigan. They were the first race riots in the history of the city. The riots were spurred by the imprisonment of Thornton and Rutha Blackburn, an African-American couple that had escaped slavery in Louisville, Kentucky, in 1831. They were caught by slave catchers, thrown in jail, and sentenced to be returned to their owners in Kentucky. This ruling angered the African-American population of Detroit. Rutha Blackburn was smuggled out by two African-American women, and the following day, a mob formed outside the jail, demanding the release of Thornton. Refusal was met with violence as the mob stormed the jail, beating the authorities and taking Thornton. Thornton was transported to Canada, where he was reunited with Rutha.

The rioting continued in Detroit into July. White Detroiters, angered by the escape of the Blackburns, retaliated by assaulting African Americans in the street and burning many of their buildings. The rioting came to a climax as the jail and adjacent stables were set aflame on July 11 and 15. The mayor was forced to bring in troops to restore order to the city on July 30. Following the riots, a set of city-wide ordinances were issued, including a mandated bond payment of $500 for every African-American resident. This caused a majority of the African-American population of Detroit to relocate to Canada.

== History ==
Thornton and Rutha Blackburn lived as slaves in Louisville, Kentucky during the early 1800s. The early 1800s was a volatile time for slavery in the United States. Practices and attitudes about slavery were changing and highly controversial between the northern and southern states. During the 1700s, slave owners of the South claimed that slavery was a positive thing, and claimed to care for their slaves as they tried not to separate them from their families when selling them. However, the invention of the cotton gin in 1793 caused the slave industry to skyrocket, and border states like Kentucky and Maryland could make a lot of money by shipping surplus slaves down South where slavery was growing. This promoted the practice of selling slaves, and slave owners no longer avoided separating slaves from their loved ones. Due to the increased risk of being separated from their families, slave flight to the North became popular during this time.

Among those threatened by separation were Thornton and Rutha Blackburn. The couple, though slaves owned by different people, were married in Louisville in 1831. A few months after their marriage, Rutha was sold to another slave owner. Before she could be shipped off, however, Rutha fled Kentucky with her husband on July 3, 1831. The two settled down in the free, northern city of Detroit, Michigan.

That fall, a white man from Louisville named Thomas J. Rogers visited Detroit. He ran into Thornton Blackburn who recognized him a slave who had fled his town a few months prior. Thornton, on the other hand, did not recognize him, and the two struck up a conversation, in which Rogers found out that another escaped slave, Rutha Blackburn, was living with him. For unknown reasons, Rogers waited two years, until the summer of 1833, to report the slaves’ whereabouts to the Kentucky authorities. When the Blackburns' owners were notified, they hired slavecatchers to capture them. The couple was arrested and put in the Detroit jail. A hearing was held on June 15, in which they were found guilty under the Fugitive Slave Act of 1793 and sentenced to be shipped back to their owners in Kentucky on June 17.

== Event ==
News of the Blackburns’ fate traveled fast throughout Detroit, angering the African-American community. Two African-American women, Tabitha Lightfoot and Caroline French, friends of Rutha Blackburn, went to the jail and asked if they could see Rutha one last time. Once inside, Rutha and French traded places and Lightfoot walked out of the jail with Rutha, disguised as French. Later, when this was discovered, French was told she would have to permanently take Rutha's place to compensate for the loss of a female slave. French, however, was released from the jail later that day.

The next day, 17 June 1833, a large, armed mob gathered outside the jail, demanding that the sheriff release Thornton Blackburn. The number of protesters ranges from 40 to 400, according to different accounts. The sheriff, John M. Wilson, attempted three times to reason with the mob. On the third try, he brought Thornton out to calm the crowd. On Thornton's emergence from the jail, he was slipped a pistol and pointed it at the jailer, threatening to shoot. The sheriff then lunged at Thornton and the two fought for the gun. This provoked the mob to storm the jail, attacking the sheriff, the jailer, the deputy, and the guards. The sheriff was fatally injured by an unknown assailant. During the confusion, Thornton was smuggled from the jail and delivered to a boat which took him and many of his supporters to Canada, where he would join his wife.

The conflict did not cease in Detroit once the Blackburns were rescued, however. White Detroiters were outraged by the Thornton's escape and joined in on the rioting. They assaulted African-American men and women in the streets and burned down over 40 buildings belonging to African Americans. The protest began as an effort to save the Blackburns, but it turned into a city-wide racial riot. The Blackburn riots are said to be the first race riots in Detroit's history. During this time, 29 people were arrested for unlawful assembly. Hearings were held on June 21 and June 22, though some arrested and tried were white, the 11 that were convicted were all African American. The struggle continued into July as a march was organized to demand the release of the jailed protesters who had not been charged of any crimes. On July 11, the jail was set on fire, but it was quickly extinguished. On July 15 the stables next to the jail were all burned down, causing $150 of damage. Following the stable fire, the mayor of Detroit, mayor Chapin, wrote the U.S. Secretary of War, Lewis Cass, and requested that troops from Fort Gratiot be brought into the city to restore order. The troops arrived on July 30 and enforced martial law, effectively putting an end to the riots.

== Outcomes for Detroit ==
With the rioting dispersed, Mayor Chapin, with the advice from the Detroit city council, issued several city-wide rulings. All African-American citizens were obligated to carry a lantern at night to make themselves visible to white citizens. A 9:00 pm curfew was set, and a night watch was established to patrol the river. All boats coming to Detroit from Canada were stopped. Those imprisoned were sentenced to work in a street repair gang to undo the damage from the riots. The Michigan law of 1827 was reinforced, "requiring blacks to register and post bond with the clerk of the county court". This meant that all African-American residents of Detroit who could not prove their freedom were to be expelled from the city. It also required a bond payment of $500. This ruling resulted in the emigration of the majority of the African-American population of Detroit to Canada.

== Outcomes for the Blackburns ==
Upon arriving in Canada, Thornton and Rutha Blackburn were arrested and put in jail in Sandwich, Windsor, Ontario. Michigan officials tried twice to get them extradited but Upper Canada had just passed an act concerning the capture and extradition of “fugitive offenders from foreign countries” that allowed Lieutenant Governor John Colburne to refuse their extradition. This law affirmed that “fugitive slaves could not be extradited to the United States if they had not committed a crime that was punishable under Canadian law”. The Blackburns had not committed a Canadian crime because slavery had just been made illegal by the Slavery Abolition Act 1833. The principal of this action was that Canada would not return slaves to their masters in the United States no matter what they had done. This established Canada as a safe terminus for the Underground Railroad. The Blackburn case was the first to be decided under that law. The Blackburns were released from jail, spent some time in Amherstburg, and then permanently relocated to Toronto in 1834.
