= Hoffos =

Hoffos is a surname. Notable people with the surname include:

- Courtney Hoffos (born 1997), Canadian freestyle skier
- David Hoffos (born 1966), Canadian artist
