= Ydessa Hendeles =

Canadian curator, art collector and philanthropist

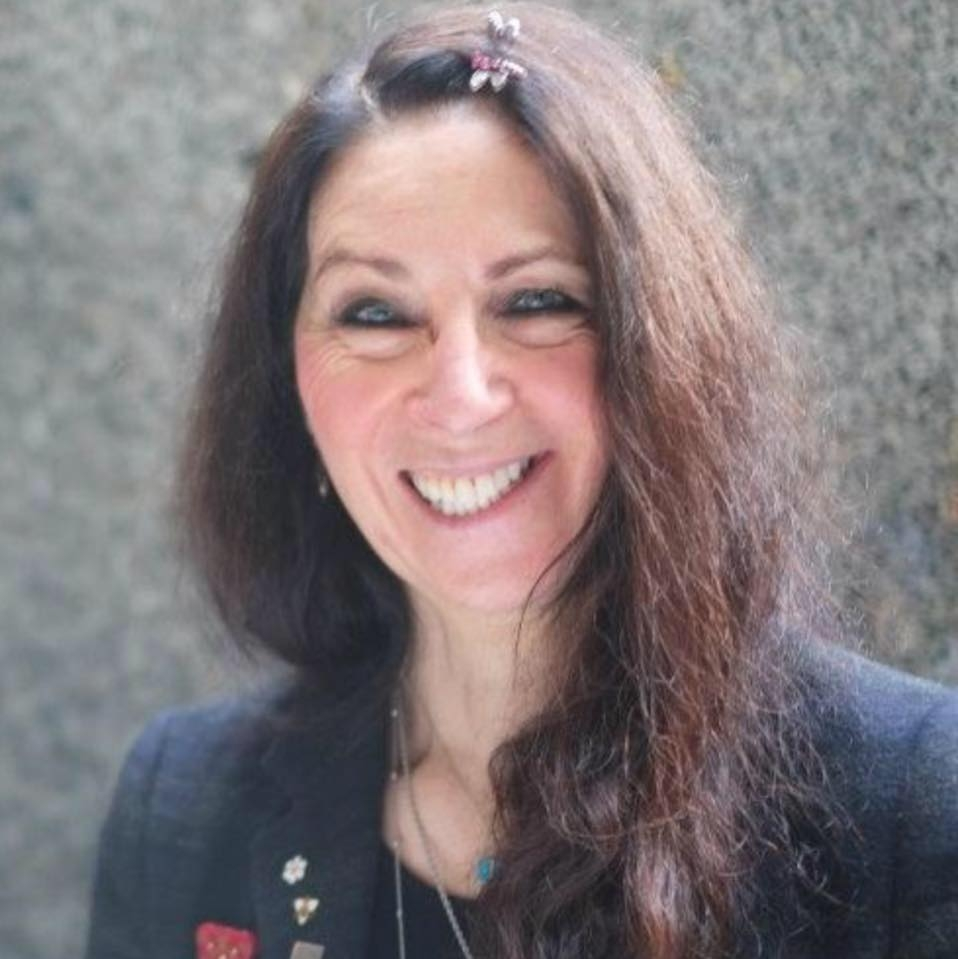
- Born: Marburg, Germany
- Known for: Artist, philanthropist

Ydessa Hendeles is a Polish-Canadian artist-curator and philanthropist born in Germany. She is also the founding director of the Ydessa Hendeles Art Foundation in Toronto, Ontario.

Hendeles is an adjunct professor with the Department of Art History at the University of Toronto, where she has endowed the Ydessa Hendeles Art Foundation Distinguished Lecturer on Art series of presentations. In 2009, she donated 32 works of International and Canadian contemporary art to the Art Gallery of Ontario, the most significant single gift of contemporary art in the gallery’s history. The donation led the institution to cite her as one who “has brought a distinctive Canadian perspective to the world stage while setting a standard for art philanthropy.”

== Life ==
Ydessa Hendeles was born in the university town of Marburg, Germany. Her parents, Jacob Hendeles and Dorothy Zweigel, were Polish Jews who both survived imprisonment in the Auschwitz and later Bergen-Belsen concentration camps. The Hendeles family immigrated to Canada when Ydessa was two years old, making Toronto their home.

A graduate of the University of Toronto, the New School of Art and the Toronto Art Therapy Institute, Hendeles earned her PhD from the Amsterdam School for Cultural Analysis at the University of Amsterdam.

== Career ==
In 1980, Hendeles established The Ydessa Gallery in Toronto, a commercial space devoted to the presentation of Canadian contemporary art. The gallery represented such artists as Kim Adams, Shelagh Alexander, Tony Brown, FASTWÜRMS, Andreas Gehr, Rodney Graham, Noel Harding, Nancy Johnson, Ken Lum, Liz Magor, John Massey, John McEwen, Peter Hill, Sandra Meigs, Jana Sterbak, Jeff Wall and Krzysztof Wodiczko. Hendeles closed The Ydessa Gallery in 1988.

In October 1987, Hendeles purchased a two-storey former uniforms factory at 778 King Street West in downtown Toronto as the headquarters and exhibition site for a new art foundation. In November 1988, after extensive renovations, the 14,000-square-foot industrial building became home of the Ydessa Hendeles Art Foundation, Canada's first privately supported contemporary-art exhibition space.

Hendeles launched her new exhibition program in December 1987 with Katharina Fritsch: Our Lady of Lourdes, presented at the Toronto Eaton Centre (the city's most popular downtown shopping mall). For the week leading up to Christmas, the peak of the mall's busiest shopping season, Hendeles installed Fritsch's sculpture of a small Madonna of Lourdes statue, enlarged to adult size and rendered in bright, yellow-painted Duroplast resin, in the middle of the pedestrian mall. The sculpture was positioned so the Church of the Holy Trinity, the historic Anglican Church adjacent to the western side of the mall would be visible in the background.

The Ydessa Hendeles Art Foundation was formally established in 1988 with a mandate to provide a program of contemporary-art exhibitions from a developing collection. In November 1988, the gallery space opened its inaugural show, Christian Boltanski, a five-gallery exhibition of the French artist’s work. This included the site-specific commission Canada (1988), the artist's first clothing-based work.

In 1996, Maclean's magazine published a profile by Sharon Doyle Driedger on Hendeles and her exhibition program at the Ydessa Hendeles Art Foundation. In the article, Driedger noted Hendeles’s influence on the art world:

Hendeles has managed to pique the interest of the art world by collecting and showing works by such luminaries as British photographer Eadweard Muybridge and American sculptor Louise Bourgeois. “These works are sought after by any great institution in the world,” says Marcel Brisebois (fr), director of the Montreal Museum of Contemporary Art. “She has a great eye. When she buys something, we look at her and say, ‘Oh, why is she doing so?’” Her bold aesthetic vision led ARTnews, a respected U.S. journal, to twice include her in its list of “the art world’s 50 most influential people” in 1993 and 1995—the only Canadian and one of just a handful of women. “Every museum curator who is not asleep knows about her,” says Robert Storr, a curator at New York City’s renowned Museum of Modern Art. Storr adds that for exhibitions of videos, films, photography and installations, “there is absolutely no better place in the world” than Hendeles’s foundation.

In his book Private Spaces for Contemporary Art (2010), Peter Doroshenko described the Ydessa Hendeles Art Foundation as functioning “more like an intellectual visual arts laboratory than an art centre or private collection space,” and declared its gallery “one of the most important contemporary spaces in North America.”

The Ydessa Hendeles Art Foundation maintained its exhibition program in Toronto until 2012, when its building was sold and the gallery closed its doors. The Foundation, however, continues to function as a not-for-profit organization in Toronto, and in 2015 it established a studio on the Upper West Side of Manhattan in the former studio of the photographer Philippe Halsman at the historic Atelier building.

=== Exhibitions ===
In 2003, Hendeles guest-curated Partners, an exhibition for the Haus der Kunst, Munich, at the invitation of then-incoming director Chris Dercon and the new chief curator, Thomas Weski. Presented in three passages, spread over 16 museum galleries, Hendeles positioned work by Diane Arbus, Maurizio Cattelan, James Coleman, Hanne Darboven, Walker Evans, Luciano Fabro, On Kawara, Paul McCarthy, Bruce Nauman, Giulio Paolini, Jeff Wall and Lawrence Weiner, together with photojournalistic images, anonymous vernacular photographs and antique objects. This exhibition also included Hendeles’s own artwork The Teddy Bear Project, 2002, a large-scale installation built around an archive of family-album photographs, each including the image of a teddy bear (see external link below). In 2004, the French filmmaker Agnès Varda made part of the exhibition the subject of her documentary short, Ydessa, les ours et etc..

The Teddy Bear Project was first shown in the group exhibition sameDIFFERENCE at the Ydessa Hendeles Art Foundation in Toronto (2002). It was expanded as a two-gallery installation for Partners in 2003, then remounted in Noah’s Ark curated by Pierre Théberge for the National Gallery of Canada (2004) and 10,000 Lives, the 2010 Gwangju Biennale, South Korea, curated by Massimiliano Gioni. It was exhibited again in 2016 at New York's New Museum in The Keeper, a group show also curated by Gioni.

Other exhibitions include Marburg! The Early Bird! at the Marburger Kunstverein (de), Germany (2010); The Wedding (The Walker Evans Polaroid Project) at Andrea Rosen Gallery, New York (2011); and THE BIRD THAT MADE THE BREEZE TO BLOW at Galerie Johann König, Berlin (2012).

Hendeles's work From her wooden sleep... (2013) was shown at the Institute of Contemporary Arts (ICA), London, UK in 2015, curated by Philip Larratt-Smith (see external link below). In 2016, Hendeles expanded and augmented From her wooden sleep… specifically for the Helena Rubinstein Pavilion for Contemporary Art (now the Eyal Ofer Pavilion for Contemporary Art) at the Tel Aviv Museum of Art, Israel, curated by Suzanne Landau. Hendeles reinterpreted From her wooden sleep... as an artist book published by Hatje Cantz in 2016.

In 2016 Hendeles’s installation Death to Pigs was mounted at Barbara Edwards Contemporary, Toronto, her first exhibition in Toronto since closing the YHAF gallery space in 2012. A catalogue for Death to Pigs was published in 2018.

In the summer of 2017, Hendeles’s exhibition The Milliner’s Daughter was shown at Toronto’s The Power Plant Contemporary Art Gallery, curated by Gaëtane Verna. This was the first major survey of Hendeles’s work in a public museum.

In 2018, the Kunsthalle Wien mounted Death to Pigs, the first institutional retrospective of Hendeles’s work in Europe, taking as its title the name of her installation first shown in Toronto in 2016. Curated by Nicolaus Schafhausen (Director, Kunsthalle Wien), the exhibition was spread over both floors of the Kunsthalle and included work by the artist drawn from the previous decade.

In 2019, Schafhausen featured Hendeles’s work, The Steeple and The People (2018), a site-specific installation at Munich’s Abtei St. Bonifaz (St. Boniface's Abbey) as part of the group exhibition Tell me about yesterday tomorrow he curated with Mirjam Zadoff (de) and Juliane Bischoff for NS-Dokumentationszentrum München (Munich Documentation Centre for the History of National Socialism).

In 2024, the Art Museum at the University of Toronto presented Hendeles's exhibition Grand Hotel as an official Collateral Event of the 60th Venice Biennale. Curated by Wayne Baerwaldt in collaboration with Project Producer Barbara Edwards, Grand Hotel was mounted at Spazio Berlendis on the Rio dei Mendicanti in the Cannaregio district of Venice.

=== Awards and recognition ===
Hendeles was inducted as a Member into the Order of Canada in 2004 and the Order of Ontario in 1998. She received a Governor General’s Award in 2002 for "Outstanding Contribution in the Visual and Media Arts." She was awarded a Queen Elizabeth II Golden Jubilee Medal in 2002 and a Queen Elizabeth II Diamond Jubilee Medal in 2012.

Hendeles received an Honorary Doctorate of Fine Art (D.F.A. h.c.) from the Nova Scotia College of Art and Design in 1996, an Honorary Doctorate of Laws (LL.D. h.c.) from the University of Toronto in 2000 and an Honorary Doctorate of Philosophy (Dr.phil h.c.) from Philipps-Universität Marburg (University of Marburg) in 2017. She was named an Honorary Fellow of the Ontario College of Art and Design (now OCAD University) in 1998 and received an "Award of Distinction" from the Faculty of Fine Arts of Concordia University, Montreal in 2009.

Hendeles received the 2004 "Founders Achievement Award," presented by the Toronto Friends of the Visual Arts and the 2003 “Award of Distinction,” from the Toronto International Art Fair (now Art Toronto). In 2007, she was named a Life Member of Art Metropole, Toronto.

The Ontario Association of Art Galleries, now Galeries Ontario / Ontario Galleries (GOG), has honoured Hendeles with multiple awards:

- Award for Outstanding Achievement (1998), conferred in its inaugural year in recognition of the “curatorial excellence and innovative programming at the Ydessa Hendeles Art Foundation.”
- Best Exhibition Installation and Design Award (2003), for sameDIFFERENCE at Ydessa Hendeles Art Foundation
- Exhibition of the Year Award (2003), for sameDIFFERENCE at Ydessa Hendeles Art Foundation
- Special Recognition Award (2007), for the exhibition Predators & Prey at Ydessa Hendeles Art Foundation
- Special Recognition Award (2008), for the exhibition Dead! Dead! Dead! at Ydessa Hendeles Art Foundation
- Exhibition of the Year Award (2011), for Marburg! The Early Bird! at the Marburger Kunstverein, Germany
- Art Publication of the Year Award (2017), for the artist’s book From her wooden sleep…, published by Hatje Cantz

In 2003, The Globe and Mail, Canada’s national newspaper chose Hendeles as its “Artist of the Year.”

== Publications ==
- Partners, edited by Chris Dercon and Thomas Weski (Haus der Kunst, Munich and Buchhandlung Walther König, Cologne), 2003 (ISBN 3-88375-755-1)
- Predators & Prey. Notes (Ydessa Hendeles Art Foundation, Toronto), 2006
- The Tragical Comedy or Comical Tragedy of Punch & Judy (Ydessa Hendeles Art Foundation, Toronto), 2007
- Curatorial Compositions. Doctoral Thesis (University of Amsterdam), 2009
- Marburg! The Early Bird! Notes at an Exhibition (Ydessa Hendeles Art Foundation, Toronto), 2010
- The Wedding (The Walker Evans Polaroid Project). Notes (Ydessa Hendeles Art Foundation, Toronto), 2011
- THE BIRD THAT MADE THE BREEZE TO BLOW. Notes (Ydessa Hendeles Art Foundation, Toronto), 2012
- From her wooden sleep... Notes at an Exhibition (Ydessa Hendeles Art Foundation, Toronto), 2015
- From her wooden sleep... (Tel Aviv Museum of Art, Tel Aviv), 2016 (ISBN 978-965539-132-9)
- Death to Pigs. Notes (Ydessa Hendeles Art Foundation, Toronto), 2016
- From her wooden sleep... (Hatje Cantz, Ostfildern), 2016 (ISBN 978-3-7757-4103-3)
- Death to Pigs (Ydessa Hendeles Art Foundation, Toronto), 2018 (ISBN 978-0-9940776-1-5)
- The Milliner's Daughter: The Art Practice of Ydessa Hendeles (Verlag der Buchhandlung Walther und Franz König, Cologne), 2024. "Ernst van Alphen and Mieke Bal explore Hendeles's art practice through an in-depth analysis of her exhibitions, The Milliner's Daughter in Toronto (2017) and Death to Pigs in Vienna (2018). The authors make a compelling argument that these ‘retrospective shows’ were each multilayered site-responsive artworks, in and of themselves, that presented parallel worlds composed of art objects and artifacts." With an essay by Emily Cadger, an interview of Gaëtane Verna by Markus Müller, and a foreword by Gaëtane Verna (ISBN 978-3-7533-0636-0)
