= UTAC =

UTAC may refer to:

- UTAC Group, a provider of test and assembly services for a wide range of semiconductor devices based in Singapore
- Utac (Union Technique de l’Automobile du motocycle et du Cycle), a member of the French AFNOR group of standardization bodies
- University of Toronto Art Centre, a public gallery, part of the Art Museum at the University of Toronto
