= Ron Benner =

Canadian artist (born 1949)

- Born: 1949 (age 76–77); London, Ontario, Canada
- Education: University of Guelph
- Occupations: Contemporary artist
- Years active: 1970-present
- Partner: Jamelie Hassan

Ron Benner (born 1949) is a Canadian artist who investigates the history and political economics of food cultures. He is also a gardener and writer who currently lives and works in London, Ontario.

== Early life and career ==
Benner studied agricultural engineering for one year at the University of Guelph (1969–70). From 1975 through 1981, Benner was a member of the Forest City Artists' Association, and was manager of the Forest City Gallery in 1980–81.

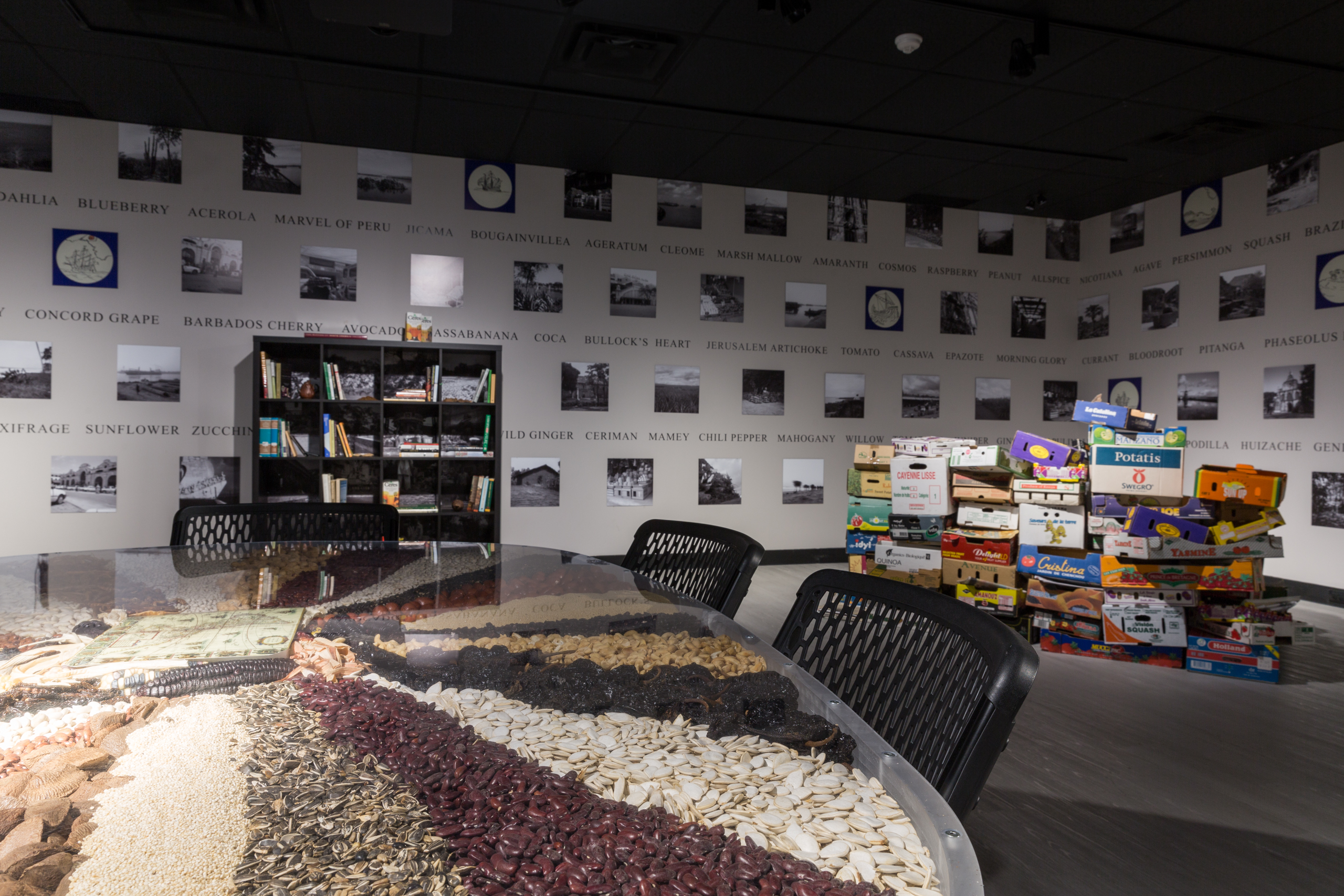
Transend: Meeting Room, Ron Benner, installation view, Robert Langen Art Gallery, curated by Suzanne Luke, 2017. Photo: Yuluo Wei

In 2010 he was appointed Adjunct Research Professor in the Visual Arts Department, Western University. His mixed media photographic installations are in the collections of the National Gallery of Canada, the Art Gallery of Ontario, Hart House (The University of Toronto), Museum London (London, Ontario), McIntosh Gallery (The University of Western Ontario), The Canada Council Art Bank and the Casa de Las Americas (Havana, Cuba).

== Garden installations ==
Benner's photographic garden installations have been installed in locations in Canada and in Salamanca and Sevilla, Spain.

In 2020, Museum London documented Benner's garden in its 14th year entitled As the Crow Flies.

== Selected solo exhibitions ==
- 2019 Trans/mission: Barley – Corn – Maize, Visual Arts Centre of Clarington, Bowmanville, ON, a year-long site-specific installation responding to the architecture and history of the former barley mill, curator Sandy Saad
- 2017- Trans/mission: Native to the Americas, permanent photographic/garden installation, sunken garden of the Wilfrid Laurier Library, organized by the Robert Langen Art Gallery, Wilfrid Laurier University, Waterloo, ON
- 2017 Transend: Meeting Room, Robert Langen Art Gallery, Wilfrid Laurier University, Waterloo, ON, curator Suzanne Luke
- 2016/17 Trans/mission: 101, photographic/garden installation, Kitchener-Waterloo Art Gallery, Kitchener, ON, curator Crystal Mowry presented in concert with CAFKA 16 (Contemporary Art Forum Kitchener Area)
- 2015 Ron Benner: 3 Questions, McIntosh Gallery, Western University, London, ON, curator Julian Haladyn
- 2015 All That Has Value, 3 guerrilla garden installations, in collaboration with CUPE, London, ON
- 2015 In Digestion, Museum London, London, ON
- 2013 Insubstantial Equivalence, photographic/garden installation, curator Peter Dykhuis, on the university campus in partnership with the agricultural faculty and the Dalhousie Art Gallery, Halifax, NS
- 2012-15 Cuitlacoche – Your Disease Our Delicacy, photographic/garden installation, curator Su Ying Lee, Hart House and Justina M. Barnicke Gallery, University of Toronto, Toronto, ON
- 2010 /10, photographic/garden installation, curator Vicky Chainey Gagnon, site project on campus, Bishop's University, Sherbrooke, Québec
- 2008 Trans/mission: Blé d’Inde, photographic/garden installation, curator Hannah Claus, Axené07, Gatineau, Québec
- 2005- As the Crow Flies, photographic/water garden installation, Museum London, London, ON
- 2003-02 Trans/mission: African Vectors, Oakville Galleries, Oakville, Ontario.
- 1997/01 Trans/mission: Corn Vectors, University of Western Ontario, London, Ontario.
- 1996/95 All That Has Value, national touring exhibition: McIntosh Gallery, University of Western Ontario and Covent Garden Market, London, Ontario; Edmonton Art Gallery, Edmonton, Alberta; Presentation House Gallery, Vancouver, British Columbia; Dunlop Art Gallery, Regina, Saskatchewan. Curated by Peter White.
- 1995 ANTHRO-APOLOGIES, Peru 1979-80, Art Gallery of Ontario, Toronto, Ontario.
- 1989 Ron Benner: Other Lives, Art Gallery of Windsor, Windsor, Ontario. Curated by Matthew Teitelbaum.
- 1988 Ron Benner: Other Lives, Mendel Art Gallery, Saskatoon, Saskatchewan. Curated by Matthew Teitelbaum.

== Selected group exhibitions ==
      

- 2019 Enawendewin Project, Artspace Gallery, Peterborough, Ontario, curated by William Kingfisher
- 2018 Imago Mundi, Onsite Gallery, Toronto, curator Francesca Valente
- 2016 Toronto: Tributes and Tributaries, 1971-1989, Art Gallery of Ontario, Toronto, curator Wanda Nanibush
- 2015 The Transformation of Canadian Landscape Art: The Inside and Outside of Being, Today Art Museum, Beijing, China
- 2014 The World is a Garden while the Walls are the State, Jamelie Hassan and Ron Benner, A Space Gallery, Toronto, curator Vicky Moufawad-Paul
- 2014 The Transformation of Landscape Art in Canada: The Inside and Outside of Being, curators Zhou Yan and Yang Chao, off-site project, Great Tang All Day Mall, Xi'an Art Museum, Xi'an, China
- 2012 Bread & Butter, Jackman Humanities Institute/Hart House, University of Toronto, ON, curator Sandy Saad in collaboration with Barbara Fischer
- 2006 Not Sheep : New Urban Enclosures and Commons, Artspeak Gallery, Vancouver, BC
- 2004 Home & Away, (Ron Benner, Jamelie Hassan, John Tamblyn & Larry Towell), Michael Gibson Gallery, London, ON
- 2003 Orange (markets), Expression, Saint-Hyacinthe, Québec.
- 2003 Bookworks on the Fence, organized by Red Tree Collective, Toronto, Ontario; Epicentro, Mexico City, Mexico and Museum of Vera Cruz, Mexico.
- 2002 To Eat or Not To Eat, Art Centre of Salamanca, Salamanca, Spain.
- 1998 Fundamental Freedoms: The Artist and Human Rights, The National Gallery of Canada, Ottawa, Ontario.
- 1998 Foodculture (Transmission: Corn Vectors), ArtLab project, University of Western Ontario, London, Ontario. Curated by Barbara Fischer.
- 1997 Southwest Biennial, Art Gallery of Windsor, Windsor, Ontario. Curated by Robin Metcalfe
- 1997 Track Records: Trains and Contemporary Photography, Oakville Galleries, Oakville, Ontario in collaboration with Canadian Museum of Contemporary Photography, Ottawa. Curated by Marnie Fleming.
- 1995 Artists' Gardens, Harbourfront Centre, Toronto, Ontario.
- 1994 Artists' Gardens, Harbourfront Centre, Toronto, Ontario.
