= Ann Maria Jackson =

Escaped enslaved woman (1810–1880)

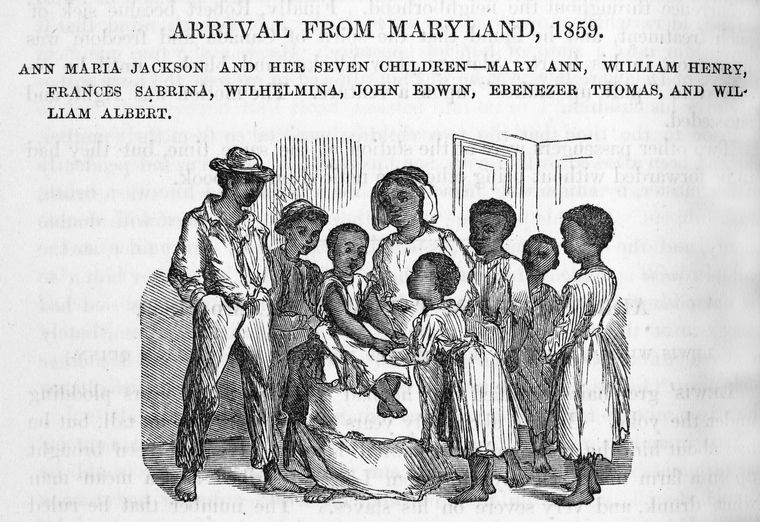
Arrival from Maryland, 1859. Ann Maria Jackson and seven of her children runaway from their slaveholder.

Ann Maria Jackson (1810–January 28, 1880) was an enslaved woman with nine children who ran away from her enslaver in November 1858 after two of her eldest children had been sold. Her husband became mentally ill and died in a poor house. After finding out that four more of her children were about to be sold, she gathered the seven children who were with her and traveled along the Underground Railroad for Canada. She went through the way of Wilmington, then to Philadelphia, later to St. Catharines, and then to Toronto. This was rare as she had brought her seven children with her through the Underground Railroad. It was difficult for women to run away secretly. The Jacksons established new lives for themselves in Toronto. Her two eldest children later reunited with the family, and the youngest, Albert Jackson, became the first African American to work as a letter carrier in Toronto.

== Marriage and children ==
Ann Maria Jackson, born about 1810, was described as a pleasant, intelligent, and attractive woman. She was enslaved by James Brown, who was a hard-drinking, wealthy widower. She had nine children with her husband John Jackson, a free blacksmith, and they lived in Milford, Delaware. According to the law (partus sequitur ventrem), children born to an enslaved women were the property of her slaveholder, which meant that John Jackson had no legal control over the welfare of his children.

Jackson was allowed to live with her husband while her children were young, saving Brown the cost of providing food for the family. Brown got a share of her earnings when she worked as a laundress or whitewashed buildings. As the children grew up they became valuable property; Brown could hire them out and keep the wages, or he could sell them outright. Jackson said, "It almost broke my heart when he came and took my children as soon as they were big enough to hand me a drink of water." She worked to ensure that her children had enough to eat and she worried that at any moment her children could be taken by their owner. Over the years, she tried to convince her husband to run away with their children, but John did not think that he could make the trip.

In 1858, the Jackson's two eldest children—James and Richard—were sold away from the family. John, upset about their sale, went insane. John died in the poor house that fall. Soon after, she found out that Brown intended to sell four more of her children away to Vicksburg, Mississippi and she quickly made plans to runaway, to find "some part of the world where she could have the control and comfort of her children".

== Flight ==
Jackson set out with seven of her children, aged between two and sixteen, in mid-November 1858. She traveled along the Underground Railroad, knowing that federal laws like the Fugitive Slave Act of 1850 allowed runaway slaves to be chased, captured, and returned to their slaveholders. Between 1850 and 1860, 15,000 to 20,000 blacks migrated to Canada, where slavery was abolished in 1834 with the Slavery Abolition Act 1833.

It was a difficult journey for the family to make and for Underground Railroad operatives to coordinate. Thomas Garrett noted that, with young children in the group, they could not walk far on foot. It was difficult for them to cross the canal near the Maryland-Pennsylvania border, which was closely watched for runaway slaves. Thomas Garrett, just outside of Wilmington, Delaware, arranged for a horse-drawn carriage that took them part of the way to Philadelphia. A second carriage took them across the Mason–Dixon line to Chester County in the free state of Pennsylvania.

They stopped at the Riverview House, the home of Thomas Garrett's brother Edward in Upper Darby Township, Pennsylvania (west of Philadelphia). The Jacksons were taken to Philadelphia, where they met William Still, an Underground Railroad stationmaster. He interviewed Jackson and her children so that he could record their stories in his Underground Rail Road book.

The fire of freedom obviously burned with no ordinary fervor in the breast of this slave mother, or she never would have ventured with the burden of seven children, to escape from the hell of Slavery.

— William Still

After Philadelphia they traveled along a network of Underground Railroad stations through Pennsylvania and New York. After crossing into Canada West, they went to St. Catharines on November 25 where Hiram Wilson took care of them and then sent them on to Toronto with letters of introduction for Mrs. Dr. Willis and Thomas Henning of the Anti-Slavery Society of Canada.

I am happy to inform you that Mrs. Jackson and her interesting family of seven children arrived safe and in good health and spirits at my house in St. Catharines, on Saturday evening last... With sincere pleasure I provided for them comfortable quarters till this morning, when they left for Toronto."

— Hiram Wilson wrote in a letter to William Still on November 30, 1859

== Settling in Toronto ==
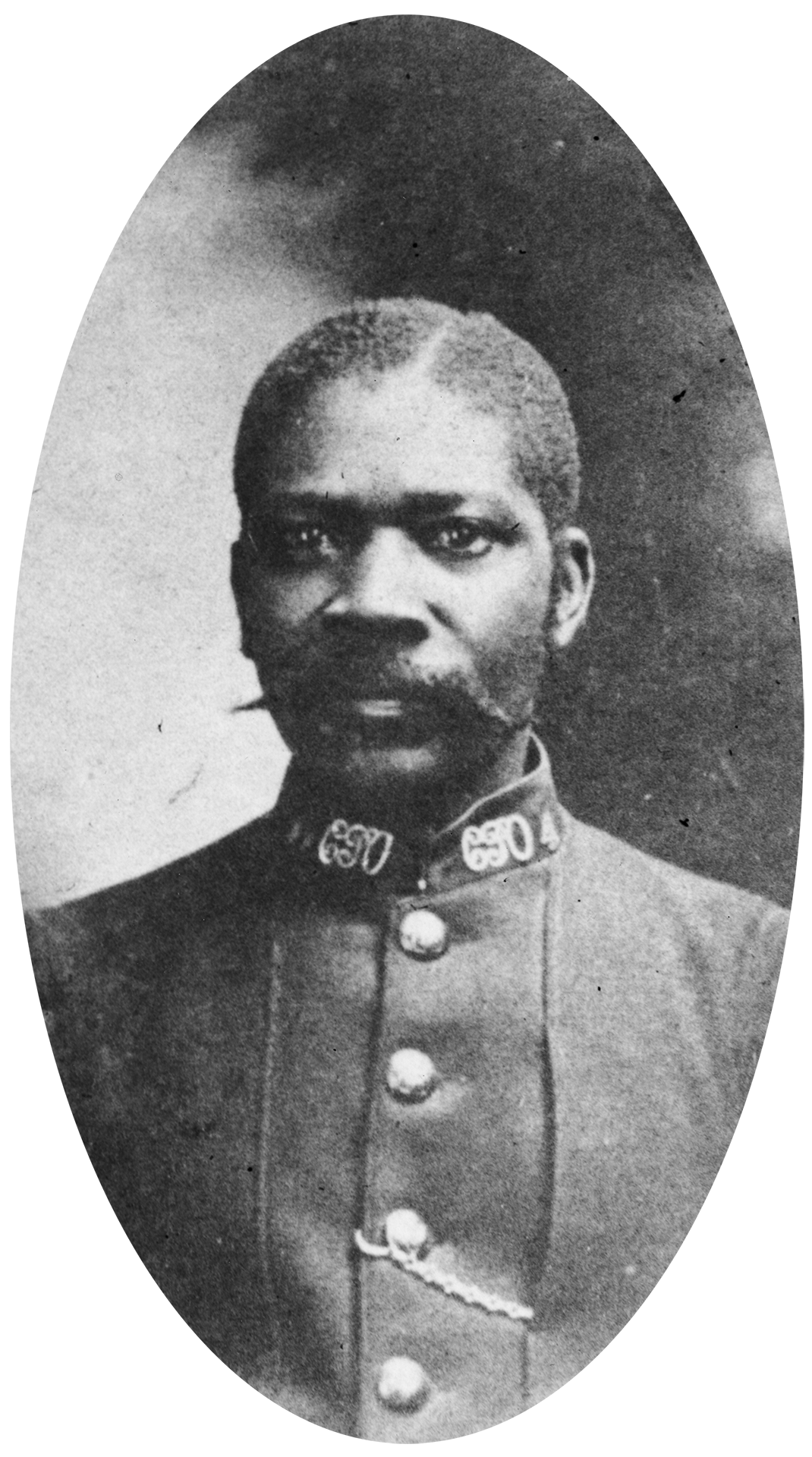
Albert Jackson, the first black letter carrier in Toronto

In Toronto, Willis and Henning took the Jacksons to the home of Lucie and Thornton Blackburn, who were previously enslaved in Kentucky. They established the first taxi business in Toronto.

Henning, Willis and the Blackburns helped the Jacksons get jobs, housing, clothing, and the necessities to become established on their own. Jackson's children were enrolled in school. Jackson supported the family by washing clothes. She rented rooms in St. John's Ward, an area of the city for immigrants. The Toronto House of Industry provided food and wood for them five weeks after they arrived and again the following winter. Jackson was described as "very industrious but she will require some relief." They rented a one-story frame house in Toronto by 1861. It was located at 93 Elizabeth Street, near Osgoode Hall.

James Henry, her eldest son, ran away from Frederica, Delaware where he was owned and was about to be sold by Joseph Brown. John Henry made it to Philadelphia, where he met with William Still in September 1858. He then left for St. Catharines. After he learned that his family had come to Canada, he made contact with them in Toronto. Later, Richard M. Jackson, also reunited with the family.

Her children established themselves as barbers, a waiter, a laundress, and other professions. Richard established hairdressing businesses with prominent and wealthy clientele. When he died in 1885, at the age of 38, a thousand people attended his funeral. Attendees included members of the black community, newspaper publishers, and former mayors and aldermen. James Henry was a waiter at the Queen's Hotel.

In 1882, the youngest son Albert became the first black letter carrier in Toronto. Having a position higher than white workers, like working as a mail sorter, was not accepted by postal workers. Although he was hired to deliver mail, he was made a mail sorter. A public inquiry was held to determine why Jackson was demoted, after which he began to deliver mail as hired, after intervention from Sir John A. Macdonald. He was a postal worker for 36 years, retiring in 1918.

== Later years and death ==
Jackson washed and ironed laundry until the year before her death. She died of dyspepsia at the home of her daughter Mrs. Harry Nelson on January 28, 1880, at the age of 70. Reverend Charles A. Washington delivered the sermon at her memorial service at the old Sayer Street Chapel (now British Methodist Episcopal Church) on Chestnut Street in St. John's Ward.

Jackson and her son Richard are interred at the Necropolis Cemetery, in the Blackburn's family grave. Jackson family members were buried in other parts of the cemetery.

== Legacy ==
The image of Jackson and her children was published on April 2, 1874, in The Nation, Lutheran Observer, Friends Review, and the New York Daily Tribune carrying the title The Father Died in the Poor House, a Raving Maniac, Caused by the Sale of Two of His Children. It appeared for more than forty consecutive issues of the Christian Recorder. William Still had this and other illustrations published to market his book The Underground Rail Road.
