= Amanda K. Hale =

Canadian writer

- Occupation: Writer
- Writing career
- Genres: Literary fiction, short fiction, creative nonfiction
- Notable work: Sounding the Blood
- Website: www.amandahale.com

Amanda K. Hale is a Canadian writer.

== Background ==
Born in England, she emigrated to Montreal, Quebec, Canada. She studied at Concordia University and received an M.A. in Creative Writing Drama. Now she divides her time between Toronto and British Columbia, the UK and Cuba. "As a creative person, Hale has travelled back and forth between visual art, theatre, and writing." Her first novel, Sounding the Blood, was "a finalist for the BC Relit Awards" and was included in NOW Magazine's Top Ten books for 2001, has been on several university reading lists in Canada, the U.S., and in Europe; and has been adapted as a screenplay. Her writing has been published in numerous Canadian and American literary magazines, and two of her books have been translated into Spanish.

Hale has been active in the arts and writing community as a co-founder of Red Tree visual arts (1989); as a member of the Broadside feminist collective (1982–1988); as vice-president of the Hornby Island Arts Council, and as a board member of the Hornby Island Festival Society.

== Works ==
=== Novels ===
- Sounding the Blood, 2001, Raincoast Books
- The Reddening Path, 2007, Thistledown Press. A Spanish edition, El Sendero Encarnado was launched in July 2008 by Verdecielo Ediciones and presented at the Guadalajara International Book Fair in November 2008.
- My Sweet Curiosity, 2009, Thistledown Press - Long-listed for the 2010 ReLit Award for Fiction
- Mad Hatter, 2019, Guernica Editions

=== Plays ===
- The Medical Show
- Re-production

=== Short fiction ===
- In the Embrace of the Alligator (Collection of short fiction), 2011, Thistledown Press. A Spanish edition: En Brazos del Caimán

=== Creative nonfiction ===
- "Death of Pedro Ivan", Creative Non-Fiction Winner for Prism International, 2008
- "Senora Amable Ponce", Creative Non-Fiction Finalist for The Malahat Review, 2009
