= Fastwürms =

Canadian artist collective

- Origin: Toronto, Ontario, Canada
- Genres: Visual arts Installation art Performance art Public art
- Years active: 1979–present
- Members: Kim Kozzi; Dai Skuse
- Past members: Napo B.
- Website: www.fastwurms.com

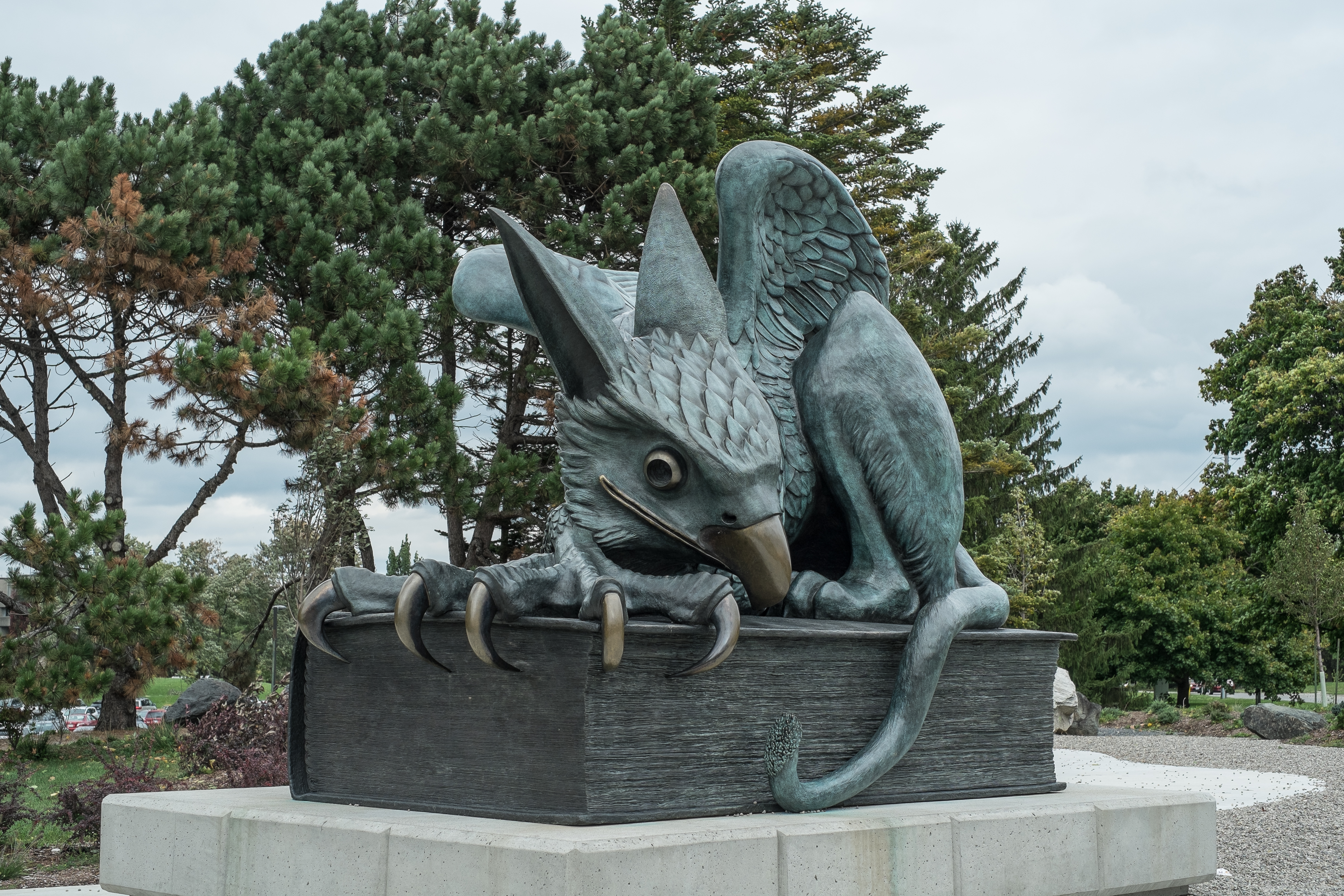
Gryphon statue at the University of Guelph completed in 2014.

Fastwürms is a Canadian artist collective based in Toronto and Creemore. Founded in 1979, Fastwürms originally had three members: Kim Kozzi, born Kim Kozolanka in Ottawa, Ontario, 1955, Dai Skuse born David Skuse in Oldham, England, 1955, and Napo B. born Napoleon Brousseau in Ottawa, Ontario, 1950. The collective was employed as security guards at the National Gallery of Canada in Ottawa prior to moving to Toronto in 1980. In the mid-1980s, Napo B. moved to NYC and formally left the collective in 1991. Kozzi and Skuse have continued to work in Toronto as Fastwürms.

== Career ==
In 1981 Fastwürms began exhibiting at The Ydessa Gallery in Toronto. They are currently represented by Paul Petro Contemporary.

Kozzi and Skuse have exhibited internationally, taught at the Toronto School of Art and OCAD and are currently Associate Professors of Studio Art in the School of Fine Arts and Music at the University of Guelph.

== Work ==
Fastwürms describes the focus of their art as social exchange and relational aesthetics. Their artwork is multidisciplinary, including video, installation, and performance art. It concerns working class aesthetics, queer politics and witch positivity.

=== Major exhibitions ===
Fastwürms' have exhibited at several institutions in Canada and internationally. Recent notable solo exhibitions include #Q33R_WTCH_P155 (2017) at Oakville Galleries in Oakville, Ontario; Unicorn Tip at Rodman Hall Art Centre, Brock University St. Catharines;DONKY@NINJA@WITCH:A Living Retrospectiveat the Art Gallery of York University, Toronto (2007), Contemporary Art Gallery (Vancouver) (2008), and Plug In ICI, Winnipeg (2008).

=== Public art ===
Fastwürms' permanent public art sculptures include Ex Ovo Omnia at the Art Gallery of Guelph; Woodpecker Column at the Metro Toronto Convention Centre; Monoceros at Liberty Village in Toronto; and a large sculpture of a gryphon at the entrance of University of Guelph.

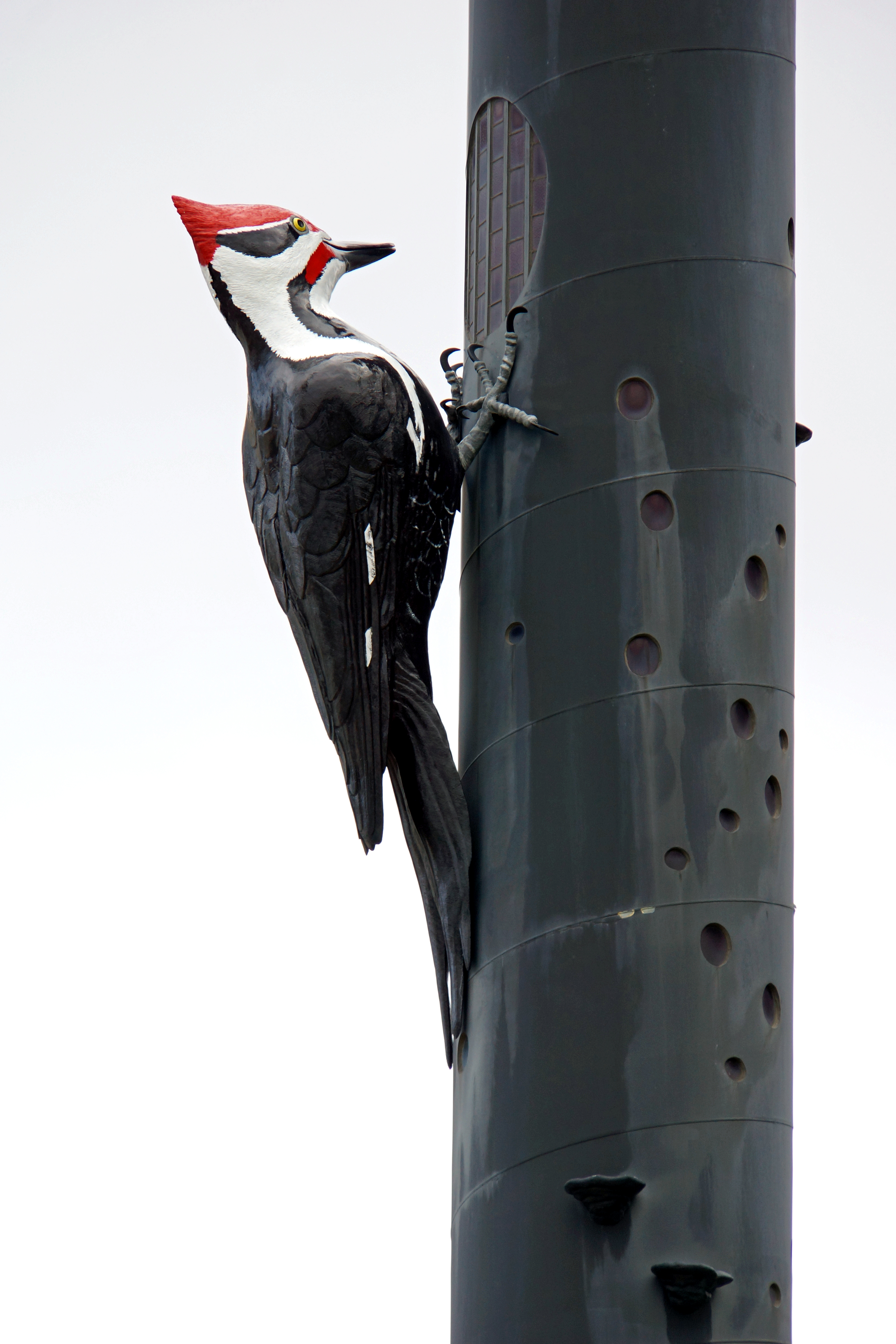
Woodpecker Column at Metro Toronto Convention Centre

==== Monoceros ====
Monoceros is a public art piece by Fastwürms currently installed in Liberty Village. This piece comes in the form of a giant bronze frog and narwhal tusk/unicorn's horn, a pair called Monoceros. According to Fastwürms the work is "based on the Tetraploid Treefrog (Hyla versicolor) and the took or 'tusk' of the Narwhal (Monodon monoceros). In medieval Europe, rare and valuable Narwhal tusks were accepted as proof positive for the existence of the magical Unicorn. The Unicorn and the Frog are both powerful icons from traditional and popular culture. They promise protection, good health, prosperity and wealth. Invest in natural wealth and the health of Narwhals and Frogs, tryst with reciprocal coexistence, and the Monoceros gyre of good fortune and good luck is yours to share." Monoceros' tusk is 37 feet high, and has an 11-foot diameter 'moon disc'. Along the Narwhal's tusk, a groove filled with crushed stone, detailed polliwogs, and tadpoles develops into frogs swimming upstream through a river of ancient coins, symbolic of health and wealth.

== Awards ==
Awarded the 2023 Governor General's Award in Visual and Media Arts for Artistic Achievement.
