= Suzanne Landau =

Israel art curator

- סוזן לנדאו
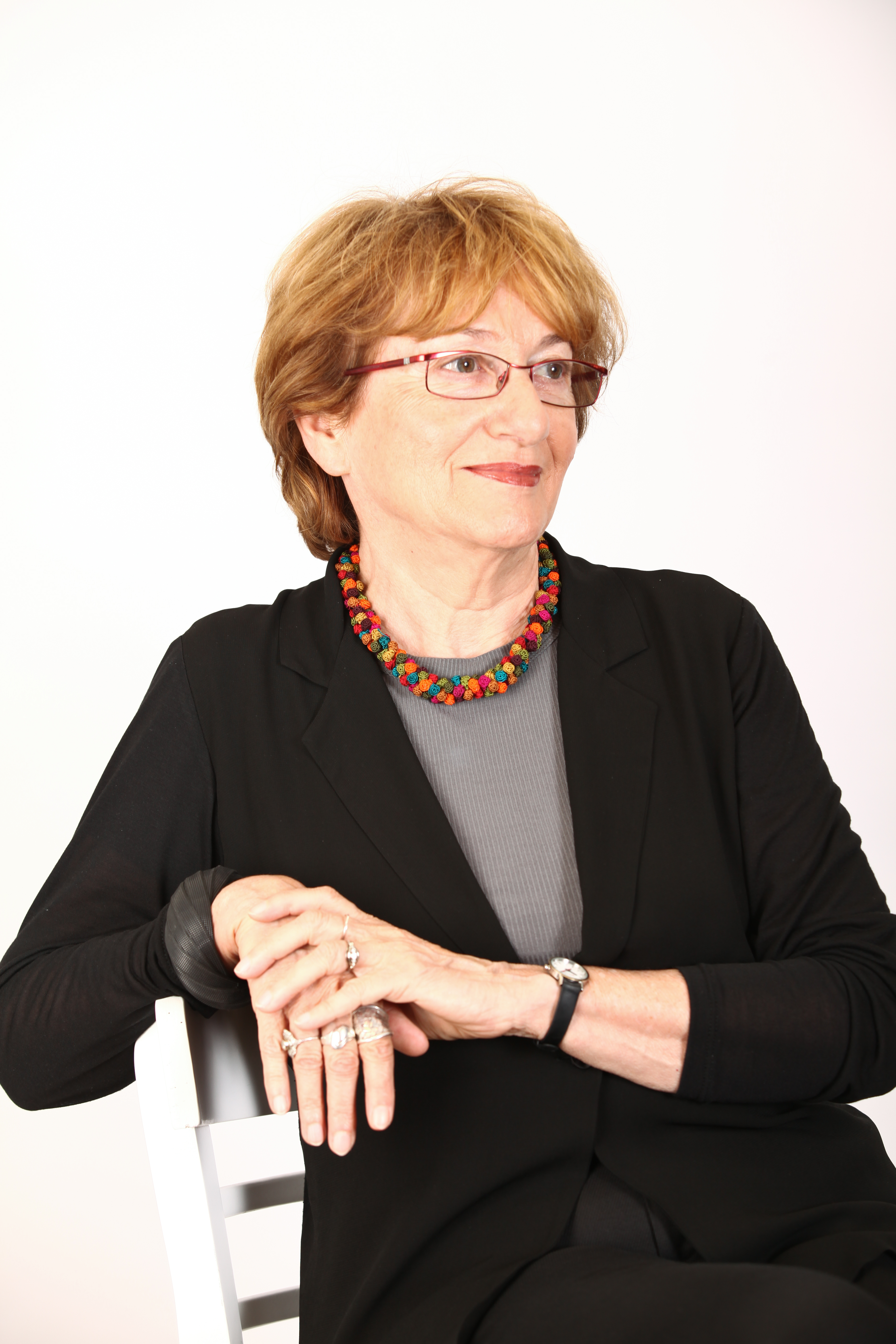
- Born: 1946 (age 79–80); Czechoslovakia
- Occupation: Art Curator

Suzanne Landau (Hebrew: סוזן לנדאו; born 1946) is an Israeli art museum curator. She was appointed the Director and Chief Curator of the Tel Aviv Museum of Art in August 2012. She had previously been Curator of Contemporary Art at the Israel Museum in Jerusalem starting 1982 and its Chief Curator of Fine Arts there from 1998. Since her appointment in Tel Aviv, she has organized for the museum the Friends of the Tel Aviv Museum of Art and the Acquisition Committee for Israeli Art.

== Early life and education ==
Suzanne Landau was born in Czechoslovakia to a pair of Holocaust survivors who migrated to Israel in 1968 following the Prague Spring. She studied at the art orientated high school in Bratislava, and in 1966 started art history at the Comenius University, Bratislava. While visiting in Israel in 1968 with the group of students, the Russians troops invaded Czechoslovakia and Landau did not return. She continued her studies at the Hebrew University, working as an illustrator at the Encyclopaedia Hebraica.

== Career ==
Landau began her career in 1978, when she became a registrar at the Israel Museum in Jerusalem. She was named the museum's Curator of Contemporary Art in 1982 and then its Chief Curator of Fine Arts in 1998. While establishing and building the contemporary art department at the Israel Museum, Landau identified and acquired works by that time young artists who were just at the beginning of their career, such as Jean-Michel Basquiat, Damien Hirst and Maurizio Cattelan among others. During her time as the Curator of Contemporary Art Landau curated an annual program of artists in residence (James Turrell, Mario Merz, Julian Opie, Richard Deacon, Nedko Solakov, Kiki Smith, Rosemarie Trockel and more). In her 34-year tenure at the Israel Museum, Landau presided over several internationally famous solo and group exhibitions, among them Anselm Kiefer (1984), Jenny Holzer/Barbara Kruger (1986), New York Now (Peter Halley, Jeff Koons, Sherrie Levine, Allan McCollum, Peter Nagy, Haim Steinbach, 1987), Christian Boltanski (1989), Life-Size (1990), Gerhard Richter (1995), Marks (with Sarkis, Juan Munoz, David Hammons, 1996), Yinka Shonibare (2002), Still-Moving (2010), William Kentridge (curator in-charge, 2011), Beyus/Kantor (with Jaromir Jedlinsky, 2012). She was also in charge of site-specific projects in the museum sculpture garden of Richard Serra, James Turrell, Magdalena Abakanowicz, Sol Lewitt, Mark Dion, Micha Ullman, Roxy Paine and Anish Kapoor on the museum's Ida Crown plaza. Landau led the Fine Arts Wing in the flagship renewal project of the museum, accomplished in 2010 and was in charge of installing and positioning the sculpture collection in the public areas of the museum (Menashe Kadishman at the entrance to the museum, August Rodin, Alexander Archipenko, Claes Oldenburg along the promenade, Nimrod by Itzhak Danziger in front of the Israeli art collection, among others).

She was named the most influential person in the world of Israeli art by Haaretz in 2013.

Landau began a collaboration with businessman Steve Nassima in late 2020, after the Israeli government permitted the limited reopening of the nation's largest museums. The result was the opening of Nassima Landau, an art space in central Tel Aviv specializing in group exhibitions of international artists, in November.

=== Curator of the Tel Aviv Museum of Art ===
Landau was appointed Director and Chief Curator of the Tel Aviv Museum of Art in August 2012 by its board of directors, filling the vacancy left by Mordechai Omer's death in office. Her selection was welcomed by the Israeli contemporary art community, which had criticized the Tel Aviv Museum's board of directors for a lack of transparency and for not consulting Israeli artists in the decision-making process. Former Israel Museum curator Martin Weil also congratulated her appointment.

Following her appointment, Landau initiated numerous exhibitions including artists like Absalon, David Claerbout, Fiona Tan, Michael Borremans, Elmgreen & Dragset, Alina Szapocznikow, Taryn Simon, R. H. Quaytman, Hiroshi Sugimoto, and launched site specific projects in the Museum's Light Fall of Douglas Gordon, Joanna Vasconselos, Tom Friedman and Ibrahim Mahama among others. Landau curated exhibitions of Ydessa Hendeles, Christian Marclay, The Clock, Louise Bourgeois Twosome (with Jerry Gorovoy), Modern Times, Masterpieces from the Philadelphia Museum and Yayoi Kusama A Retrospective.

Landau established the Contemporary Art Department, Museum Friends and Volunteers organizations, initiated acquisition group of Israeli art, new branding of the museum, the renewal project of the sculpture garden and of the museum's main historical building, including its facade, new entrance hall, museum shop, the Nazarian Family Experiential Center and the Studio café open to the sculpture garden. She concluded her directorship at the Tel Aviv Museum of Art in December 2018, while the museum reached over one million visitors for the first time.

In 2015, to mark the 50th anniversary of establishment of German-Israeli relations, Landau and a team of curators have curated an exhibition of selected artworks from the Tel Aviv Museum of Art's collections held at the Martin-Gropius-Bau in Berlin. 72 pieces were transferred to Berlin in the first exhibition of the Tel Aviv Museum's collection in Germany. The artworks selected from three departments at the Tel Aviv Museum of Art: Modern Art, Prints and Drawings, and Israeli Art.

== Personal life ==
She is married to Yoram Feldhay, has a son, Danny, and a daughter, Maya.
