= Soheila Esfahani =

Iranian artist and educator

- Born: Tehran, Iran
- Education: University of Waterloo, University of Western Ontario
- Occupations: Visual artist, educator
- Known for: Installation art, sculpture

Soheila Esfahani is an Iranian-born artist and educator, working in Canada. She is an assistant professor at University of Western Ontario. Esfahani is known for her installation art and sculptures.

Esfahani was born in Tehran, Iran. She moved to Canada in 1992 for her undergraduate studies. She received a BA degree in fine arts from the University of Waterloo; followed by a Master of Fine Arts degree from the University of Western Ontario.

Esfahani was the receipt of the Ontario Arts Council Project Grant: mid career artist. Esfahani has also received awards from Canada Council for the Arts, the Social Sciences and Humanities Research Council of Canada, the Ontario Arts Council, and the Region of Waterloo Arts Fund. Notably, she was nominated for the Jameel Prize at the Victoria & Albert Museum in London, UK in 2015.

== Style and Practice ==
Through research and art, she investigates how culture changes during the process of translation. Her work specifically questions how cultural identity is lost, spread, and eventually reclaimed.

Her work uses ornamentation and souvenirs to question how culture is lost, spread, and reclaimed in new contexts. She navigates the landscape of cultural translation by viewing these objects as 'portable culture'—vessels for tradition that remain intact even as they cross international borders.

== Exhibitions ==
Esfahani has exhibited numerous shows in Canada and internationally, including:

- Been T(here) (2022), at Red Head Gallery in Toronto, Canada in 2022, Pattern (dis)Placement,
- Redeemer University College Gallery (2019), in Ancaster, Ontario, Canada
- Interstice, Republic Gallery (2019), Vancouver, British Columbia, Canada
- In-Between, Durham Art Gallery (2016), Durham, Ontario, Canada
- Trans-(across, over, beyond), MFA Thesis Exhibition, Art Lab, University of Western Ontario, London, Ontario, Canada

== Publications ==
- Pasiechnik, Jenelle M. Embodied Engagements: The Artwork of Jamelie Hassan & Soheila Esfahani in Translations, Exhibition catalogue, Campbell River Art Gallery, Campbell River, BC. 2020
- The Living River Project: Art, water and Possible Worlds exhibition catalogue, Art Gallery of Windsor, Windsor, ON. 2019
- The Source: Rethinking Water Through Contemporary Art exhibition catalogue, Rodman Hall Art Centre, Brock University, St. Catharines, ON. 2017
- Embracing Place exhibition catalogue, Homer Watson House & Gallery, Kitchener, ON. 2017
- The Red Head Gallery at 25 exhibition catalogue, The Red Head Gallery, Toronto, ON. 2017
- Matotek, Jennifer ed. Material Girls. London, UK: Black Dog Publishing Ltd, 2015.
