= Woodpecker Column =

Sculpture in Toronto, Ontario, Canada

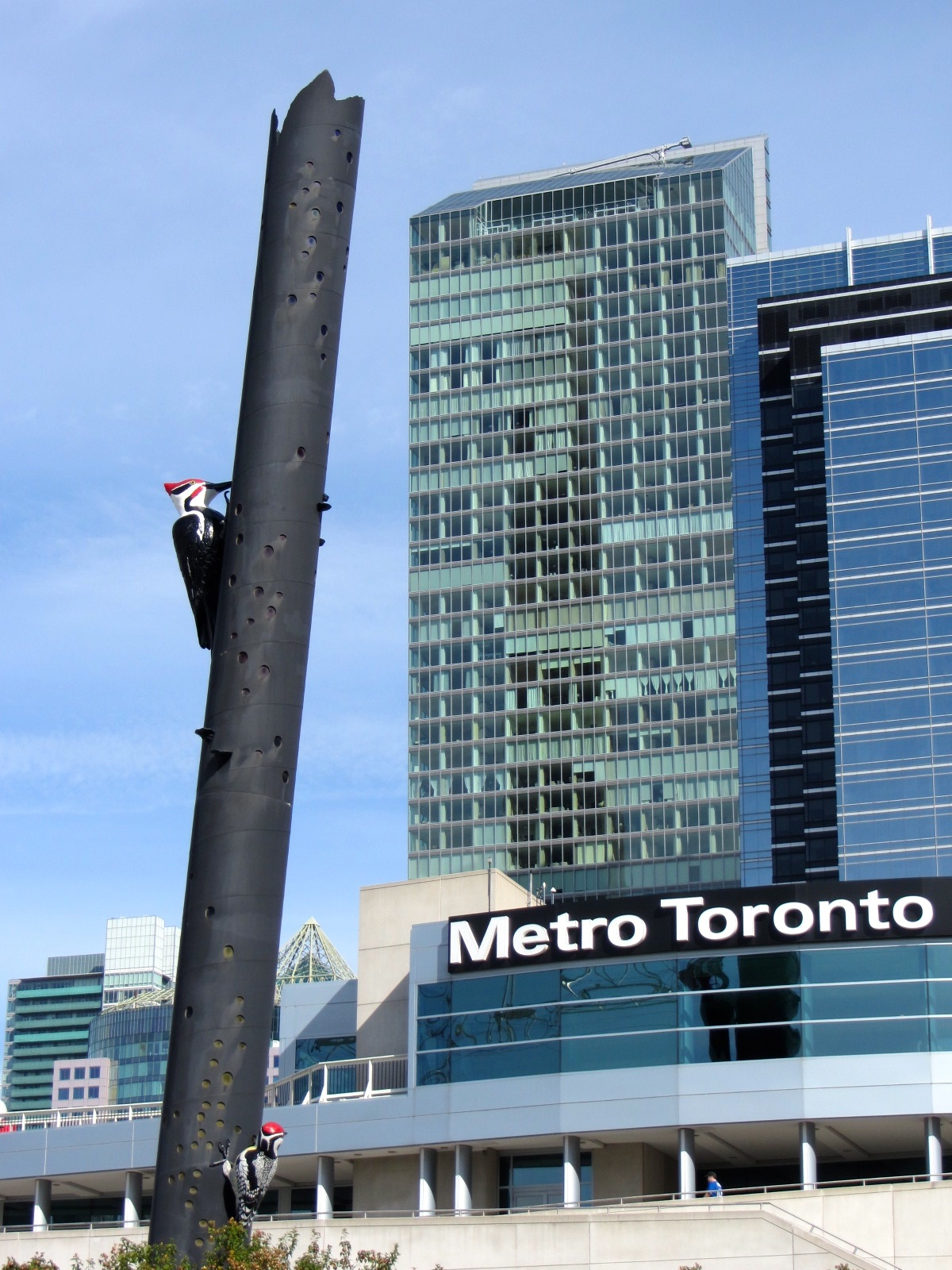
- The sculpture in 2012
- Artist: FASTWÜRMS
- Location: Toronto, Ontario, Canada
- 43°38′34.2″N 79°23′6″W

Woodpecker Column is a public artwork by the Canadian artist collective FASTWÜRMS, installed by the South Building of the Metro Toronto Convention Centre, in Toronto, Ontario, Canada. The artwork stands close to the CN Tower. The 98-foot-tall (30 meters) black steel column was installed in 1997 and depicts a pileated woodpecker and a yellow-bellied sapsucker, both species native to Canada and the United States. The two birds are 6.5 feet (two meters) tall.
