= Thornton Blackburn =

American slave (1812–1890)

- Born: c. 1812; Maysville, Kentucky
- Died: 1890; Toronto, Ontario

Thornton Blackburn (c. 1812–1890) was a self-emancipated formerly enslaved man whose case established the principle that Canada would not return slaves to their masters in the United States and thus established Canada as a safe terminus for the Underground Railroad.

== Early life ==
Blackburn was born in Mason County, Kentucky, and grew up in Washington, Kentucky, now part of Maysville, Kentucky. He was first sold at age three. At 14, he was taken to Hardinsburg, Kentucky. Three years later, Thornton was sent to Louisville, Kentucky, where he was hired out to work as a porter for a dry goods company. In Louisville, at the age of 19, he met his future wife Lucie, 28 years old at the time, who was enslaved as a nursemaid.

== Escape ==
Thornton and Lucie escaped from Louisville to Michigan in 1831. They had been living there for two years when, in 1833, Kentucky slave hunters located, re-captured, and arrested the couple. The Blackburns were jailed but were allowed visitors, which provided the opportunity for Lucie to exchange her clothes and her incarceration with Mrs. George French. Lucie was then smuggled across the Detroit River to safety in Amherstburg, in Essex County, Upper Canada.

Thornton's escape was more difficult because he was heavily guarded, bound and shackled. The day before Thornton was to be returned to Kentucky, Detroit's black community rose up in protest in the Blackburn Riots. A crowd of about 400 men stormed the jail to free him. During the commotion, two individuals called Sleepy Polly and Daddy Walker helped Thornton escape and eventually find safety in Essex County, Upper Canada. The commotion turned into a two-day riot during which the local sheriff was shot and fatally wounded. It was the first race riot in Detroit, resulting in the first Riot Commission to be formed in the United States.

While the unrest in Detroit continued, Thornton's supporters procured a horse-cart and conveyed Thornton away from Detroit to the northeast. A posse had formed to pursue Thornton and caught up with the cart about one mile outside of Detroit. Thornton's pursuers then discovered that Thornton had disembarked from the cart shortly after it had arrived in the wilderness outside of Detroit. With help from his rescuers, Thornton was able to circle west and south of Detroit. He boarded a boat near the mouth of River Rouge and crossed the Detroit River into Essex County to join his wife.

Once in Essex County, Thornton was jailed briefly while a formal request for his return was issued by the Michigan territorial governor. A reply came from the Lieutenant-Governor of Upper Canada, Major General Sir John Colborne, who refused extradition to the United States, noting that a person could not steal himself and that lifetime slavery was too severe a punishment for any crime less than murder.

== Toronto ==
In 1834, Thornton reunited with his wife Lucie in the newly incorporated City of Toronto, where he worked as a waiter at Osgoode Hall. Together, they lived on Eastern Avenue for the next half century.

Thornton created Toronto's first taxi service in 1837, named "The City". Though illiterate, he saw the need for a taxi service and so obtained blueprints for a cab from Montreal and commissioned its construction. He started this service by building a red and yellow box cab named "The City," drawn by a single horse and able to carry four passengers, with a driver in a box at the front, which he would operate. It became the nucleus of a successful taxicab company.

Some time in the late 1830s, Thornton made a daring return to Kentucky to bring his mother, Mubby (born c. 1776 in Virginia), back with him to join another son, Alfred, Thornton's brother, who may have arrived in Toronto as early as 1826. The Blackburns continued to be active in anti-slavery and community activities, helping to build the nearby Little Trinity Church, now the oldest-surviving church in Toronto. Thornton participated in the North American Convention of Colored Freemen at St. Lawrence Hall in September 1851, was an associate of anti-slavery leader George Brown, and helped former slaves settle at Toronto and Buxton.

The Blackburns took in African American freedom seekers, including Ann Maria Jackson and her seven children in 1858. The youngest child, Albert, became the first black postman of Toronto. When immigrants came to Toronto, many settled in St. John's Ward. The Blackburns built six homes there that they rented out at nominal rates for former enslaved people.

Thornton died on February 26, 1890, leaving an estate of $18,000 and six properties, and is buried at Toronto's Necropolis Cemetery. Lucie died five years later, on February 6, 1895.

== Legacy ==
In 1999, the Historic Sites and Monuments Board of Canada designated the Blackburns "Persons of National Historic Significance" for their personal struggle for freedom, which was emblematic of so many similar but typically undocumented cases. Also importantly, the Blackburns' situation prompted the articulation of a legal defense against slavery. They were also designated for their contribution to the growth of Toronto, generosity to the less fortunate, and lifelong resistance to slavery. In 2002, plaques in their honour were erected at the site of their excavated house in Toronto, Ontario, and in Louisville, Kentucky.

In 1985, an archaeological dig uncovered the foundations of the Thorntons' home, leading to a book about their lives, I've Got a Home in Glory Land: A Lost Tale of the Underground Railroad, written by historian Karolyn Smardz Frost.

In 2015, a mural near their former home, "Site Specific," was installed. It depicts the history of the neighbourhood, and includes the Thorntons' cab.

In 2016, a conference centre at George Brown College in Toronto was named for Thornton and Lucie Blackburn, and a mural depicting their story has been painted in the building's downstairs lobby.

== See also ==
- Buxton National Historic Site and Museum
- Blackburn Riots
