= Red Tree Collective =

Red Tree is a multi-disciplinary artists' collective founded in Toronto in 1989. Founding Members: Amanda K. Hale (theatre), Lynn Hutchinson (visual art) and Georgia Watterson (literature).

Collective Creation and Community Art Practice: Red Tree works in interdisciplinary and cross-cultural collaboration with artists and/or community members. Cultural workers, activists and community workers are co-authors in creation and presentation of artistic production. Community art collaborations are driven by specific cultural practices or community issues and are guided by principles of participatory research. Red Tree positions inclusive and collective process against disciplinary canons. Red Tree Homepage

Red Tree has received peer-reviewed grants from Canada Council, Ontario Arts Council, Toronto Arts Council, as well as support from foundations and governments. In 2015, the City of Hamilton supported the production and installation of a series of art banners connecting arts audiences and soccer fans in conjunction with the PanAm soccer games. Participating artists June Pak, Sadko Hadzihasanovic, Shelley Niro, Fiona Kinsella, Amelia Jiménez and Klyde Broox were part of a larger program in collaboration with Centre3 for Print and Media Arts

Current Members Toronto: Lynn Hutchinson, Dr. Asselin Charles, Amelia Jiménez[2], Neri Espinoza, and Hamilton: Klyde Broox[3], Ingrid Mayrhofer and Amanda Lemus

Guest artists: Shelley Niro | Sally Frater | Raffael Iglesias |Sady Ducros | Beatriz Pizano | Margo Charlton | Samina Mansuri | Claire Carew |Hannah Claus | John Donoghue | Ronald Lee | Ron Edding | Spin | Adrienne Reynolds | Sadko Hadzihasanovic | Vince Pietrapaolo | Jamelie Hassan | Ron Benner | Antonio Mendoza | Jorge Lozano | Anne Marie Beneteau | Dámarys Sepúlveda | Daniel David Moses | Leonarda Reyes | Nuno Cristo | Aida Jordão | Maria Ramirez |Marcel Commanda | Miguel Lima | Nazeer Khan | Nano Valverde | Penny McCabe | Augusto Crespín | Don Bouzek | Rodrigo Chavez | Fernando Hernandez | Larry Towell | Monique Mojica | Billy Merasty| shannon crossman| SAMINA MANSURI | René FRANCISCO | BRYCE KANBARA | PETER KARUNA | DELIO DELGADO | ANDREW McPHAIL ... and more

== Project chronology ==
- 2015 – ArtMatch banners
- 2011/12 – of food and form part 2 Dishing Part 1 with Amelia Jiménez, Samina Mansuri, Shannon Crossman, Ingrid Mayrhofer
- 2010/2011 – Canada without shadows/ kanada Bizo uchalipe
- 2010 – Scouring City, Brushing Sky
- 2009 – ReMix (The Cuban Exchange Project) including Popeye's Golden Theory
- 2008 – Un Sólo Cielo/Under a Single Sky
- 2007/8 – Shukar Lulugi (Beautiful Flower)
- 2007 – From One Place To Another: Las Dos Realidades
- 2005 – LOKI GILI/Song of Sorrow, Song of Hope
- 2002–2003 ART/BOOKS ON THE FENCE/Libros al limite
- 2001 – ENCHANTED STONES
- 2000 – GREETING TO TANIPERLA
- 1999 – NUNCA MAS/Never Again
- 1999 – BIRDS OF A FEATHER
- 1998 – STRATEGIES AROUND VIOLENCE
- 1997 – EAT OR BE EATEN
- 1992–1994 – THE RIVER OF BLOOD FLOWS ON
- 1989–1992 – THE MOUNTAINS ARE BREATHING
