= Jamelie Hassan =

Canadian artist (born 1948)

- Born: 1948 (age 77–78); London, Ontario, Canada
- Education: University of Windsor, Al-Mustansiriya University

Jamelie Hassan (born 1948) is a Canadian multidisciplinary artist, lecturer, writer and independent curator.

== Early life and education ==
Hassan was born in London, Ontario, to a Lebanese immigrant family and grew up in an Arabic speaking household with ten siblings. Her maternal grandfather and her father travelled from mountain villages in Lebanon to North America in the early 1900s, fleeing Turkish military conscription and World War I.

After completing her high school studies, Hassan travelled to Rome in 1967 and to Beirut in 1968, where she studied at the Academy of Fine Arts, Rome and then the Académie libanaise des beaux-arts, Beirut. This trip to Lebanon confirmed her Lebanese cultural background. Upon her return to Canada, she established an artist's studio and became active in the cultural community of London, Ontario, learning of it through The Heart of London exhibition. She sold her first work of art in 1971.

Hassan is a Graduate of the University of Windsor in Windsor, Ontario. In 1978–1979, she travelled to Baghdad, Iraq, and studied Arabic at Al-Mustansiriya University. Extensive travel continues to enrich her work, which often reflects this artist's respect for popular, traditional and indigenous art forms.

== Themes ==
In 1976–1977, Hassan was politicized by encountering postcolonial cultures during her travels in Central and South America. Hassan started exhibiting ceramics or fiberglass objects called 'actualizations'.

Her installation-based art practice spans over thirty years and is both personal and political. It addresses worldwide concerns on racism, the subjection of women, cultural interactions, colonialism and political conflicts. Hassan often works with traditional or contemporary cultural artifacts, to make cross-cultural references, such as cultural displacement, Argentinian dictatorship (Los Desaparecidos, 1981), or the narratives of intersecting cultures (Boutros Al Armenian / Mediterranean Modern, 1997).

A survey exhibition in 2009 at Museum London in London Ontario, combined elements of photography, text, ceramics, neon light and video to tie in language and the politics of place that connects Hassan as a Canadian artist to her Arabic background.

In 1983, Hassan co-founded the London artist cooperative, Embassy Cultural House, serving on its board from 1985 to 1990.

== Projects and collaborations ==
Among the projects in which Hassan has taken part are:

- curating the Havana/London Exchange in 1988
- Indian Summer, an exhibition shown in several locations in London and Brantford in 1990.
- a collaborative bookwork titled Jamelie-Jamila Project with Jamila Ismail in 1992.
- Trespassers and Captives in 1999, an examination of colonialism through the collections of the historic Eldon House in London, Ontario, that included an interdisciplinary writing project published as its catalogue.
- Pasiechnik, Jenelle M. Embodied Engagements: The Artwork of Jamelie Hassan & Soheila Esfahani in Translations, Exhibition catalogue, Campbell River Art Gallery, Campbell River, BC. 2020

== Major exhibitions ==
=== Selected solo exhibitions ===
- Jamelie Hassan (2013), Wilfrid Laurier University, Waterloo, ON, curated by Suzanne Luke.
- Re-enacting Resistance (2012), Art Gallery of Windsor, Windsor, Ontario, curated by Srimoyee Mitra
- Jamelie Hassan: At the Far Edge of Words, survey exhibition (2009–2013), curated by Melanie Townsend, Museum London, London, Ontario, and Scott Watson, Morris & Helen Belkin Art Gallery, University of British Columbia, Vancouver, British Columbia; travelled to the University of Lethbridge Art Gallery, Lethbridge, Alberta; Dalhousie University Art Gallery, Halifax, Nova Scotia; Carleton University Art Gallery, Ottawa, Ontario; MOCCA, Toronto, Ontario; publication Museum London and Belkin Art Gallery
- The Films of Jamelie Hassan, a film program curated by Miriam Jordan and Julian Jason Haladyn, Museum London and the Film Department of the University of Western Ontario, London, Ontario.
- King’s Kian: In & Out of Place (2007), King's University College, The University of Western Ontario, London, Ontario
- Smurfistan (2004), La Chambre Blanche, Québec City, Quebec
- Sister Speak to Me, A Tribute to Zahra Kazemi, organized event including premiere screening of film (collaborative documentary film produced with Tyson Haller) and forum, London Public Library, London, Ontario
- Caribbean Books (2002), exhibition (collaboration with Richard Bolai), Caribbean Contemporary Arts, Port of Spain, Trinidad
- L’espace de l’alphabet (2000), with performance by Jim Drobnick, Oboro Gallery, Montreal, Quebec
- Trespassers & Captives (1999), artist in residence, Eldon House & London Regional Art & Historical Museums, London, Ontario with catalogue
- Aldin’s Gift (1996), Art Gallery of York University, North York, ON; Art Gallery of Windsor and Boutros Al Armenian/Mediterranean Modern, 2381 Windermere, Windsor, Ontario (1997); Publication ISBN 0921972172/978-0921972174
- In the Realm of Freedom (1996), YYZ Gallery, Toronto, Ontario
- Seek Knowledge Even Onto China (1995), Artspeak Gallery, Vancouver, British Columbia
- Si-murgh et La Montagne du Lotus, Chine (1993), La Chambre Blanche, Québec City, Quebec
- The Conference of the Birds (1992), Or Gallery, Vancouver, British Columbia
- Two Women in One (1991), Presentation House Gallery, Vancouver, British Columbia Publication: The Jamila Jamelie Project (a collaboration and bookwork with writer/performer Jamila Ismail) (published 1992)
- Inscription (1990), Dunlop Art Gallery, Regina, Saskatchewan; Publication text by Gayatri Chakravorty Spivak
- vitrine 448 (1988), Mercer Union Gallery, Toronto, Ontario
- Primer for War (1985), Mount St. Vincent University Gallery, Halifax, Nova Scotia

=== Selected group exhibitions ===
- Embodiment (2017–2018), Museum London, London, Ontario
- From the Vaults: Recent Acquisitions (2017–2018), Museum London, London, Ontario
- Carry Forward (2017–2018), Kitchener-Waterloo Art Gallery, Kitchener, Ontario. Curated by Lisa Myers, touring to Rodman Hall Art Centre, St. Catharine's, Ontario and Dunlop Art Gallery, Regina, Saskatchewan
- Deconstructing Comfort, Open Space (2017), Victoria, British Columbia, curated by Michelle Jacques, France Trepanier and Doug Jarvis
- What is left? What is Right? (2017) Forest City Gallery, London, Ontario, curated by Christina Battle and Jenna Faye Powell
- Cold Front (2017), McIntosh Gallery, Western University, London, Ontario
- Geopoetics (2017), Stewart Hall, Point-Claire, Quebec, curated by Kasia Basta
- Here: Locating Contemporary Canadian Artist (2017), Aga Khan Museum, Toronto, Ontario, curated by Swapnaa Tamhane.
- Toronto:Tributes + Tributaries, 1971–1989 (2016–2017), Art Gallery of Ontario, Toronto, Ontario, curated by Wanda Nanibush
- Uncovering Artists' Books, survey exhibition (2016–2017), Grimsby Public Art Gallery, Grimsby, Ontario, School of Art Gallery, University of Manitoba, Winnipeg, Manitoba, curated by Geraldine Davis
- Disorientated: works from the Collection (2016), St. Mary's University Art Gallery, Halifax, Nova Scotia
- What can we do together that we can't do alone? (2016) (6th CAFKA, public art project, Kitchener City Hall, Kitchener, Ontario
- Sign, Sign, Everywhere a Sign, selections from permanent collection (2015), Hart House and University of Toronto, Toronto, Ontario
- Nur (2014), off-site project of the Transformation of Canadian Landscape Art: The Inside and Outside of Being, Library of the Great Mosque of Xi'an, China, curated by Yan Zhou, Christine Platt, and Yang Chao
- Resistance, Manif d'art 7 (2014), La Biennale de Quebec, Quebec curated by Vicky Chainey Gagnon
- Restless Precinct, a multi-media group exhibit (2014), The Guild, Scarborough, Ontario, curated by SUM°, Reena Katz and Alize Zorlutuna
- The World is a Garden: Ron Benner & Jamelie Hassan (2013), La Biblioteca Andrés Henestrosa, Oaxaca, Mexico, curator Freddy Aguilar, with some works installed in the courtyard of this restored colonial site which was converted to a library and exhibition space.
- A Circle of Friends: The Doreen Curry Collection (2013), McIntosh Gallery, Western University, London, Ontario
- In Order to Join (2013–2015), Museum Abteiberg, Monchengladbach, Germany, and Goethe-Institut, Mumbai, India, curated by Swapnaa Tamhane and Susanne Titz
- Magic Squares: The Patterned Imagination of Muslim Africa in Contemporary Culture (2011), Textile Museum of Canada, Toronto, Ontario
- Location-Dislocation (2011), Jackman Humanities Institute, University of Toronto] Toronto, Ontario
- Where will you be in eternity? Assemblage/Series (2011), Thielsen Gallery, London, Ontario
- Conflict Resolution site installation for LOLA (2011), in Victoria Park, London, Ontario
- A(l)lure of the Local (2010), Museum London, London, ON

== Awards and recognition ==
In 2001, Hassan received a Governor General's Award in Visual and Media Arts in recognition of her artistic achievement. Her activism, curatorial work and contributions to the artist-run centre movement in Canada were also mentioned by the jury in their statement.

In 2018, OCAD University, Toronto conferred honorary doctorate degrees upon four prominent Canadians: visual artist Jamelie Hassan, fashion journalist Jeanne Beker, filmmaker David Cronenberg, and Dr. William Reichman, CEO of Baycrest Health Sciences.
