= Gaëtane Verna =

Canadian museum curator

Gaëtane Verna (born in Kinshasa in the Democratic Republic of the Congo to Haitian parents.), is a Canadian museum curator who was the Wexner Center for the Arts Executive Director in Columbus, Ohio. At the age of 2, the family moved to Canada.

Verna holds a master's degree and a Master's of Advanced Studies from the Paris 1 Panthéon Sorbonne University as well as an international heritage administration and conservation diploma from the École Nationale du Patrimoine de Paris. Gaëtane Verna has taught at the Department of Art History at Bishop's University in Sherbrooke and at the Université du Québec à Montréal.

From 1998 to 2006, she was the curator at the Foreman Gallery of Bishop's University in Lennoxville, Quebec. She was the executive director and Chief Curator of the Musée d'art de Joliette from 2006 to 2012. In 2012, she became Director and artistic director of The Power Plant Contemporary Art Gallery in Toronto, Ontario, and was the first woman to hold the position. Artists with whom she has collaborated since 1998 include Terry Adkins, John Akomfrah, Vasco Araújo, Fiona Banner, Ydessa Hendeles, Alfredo Jaar, Luis Jacob, Kimsooja, Yam Lau, Oswaldo Maciá, Javier Tellez, Denyse Thomasos, Bill Viola, Young-Hae Chang Heavy Industries, Miriam Cahn, Mario Pfeifer and Franz Erhard Walther.

In 2022, Verna was named the executive director of the Wexner Center for the Arts at The Ohio State University, Columbus, Ohio.

== Accomplishments ==
Verna was a board member of the Canada Council for the Arts. From 2019 to 2021 Verna was the President of the Board of the Toronto Arts Council. She was a member of the Conseil des arts de Montréal as well as the President of the Visual Arts from 2006 to 2012. In 2010, she presided over the jury of the Ozias-Leduc Prize. In 2017, she was named Knight of the Order of Arts and Letters by the Cultural Service of the French Embassy in Canada to highlight and recognize her significant contribution to the advancement of the arts in France and around the world. She was named curator of the Canadian pavilion presenting the work of Kapwani Kiwanga for the 60th Venice Biennale.
