= Albert Jackson (mail carrier) =

First Black Canadian mail carrier in Toronto

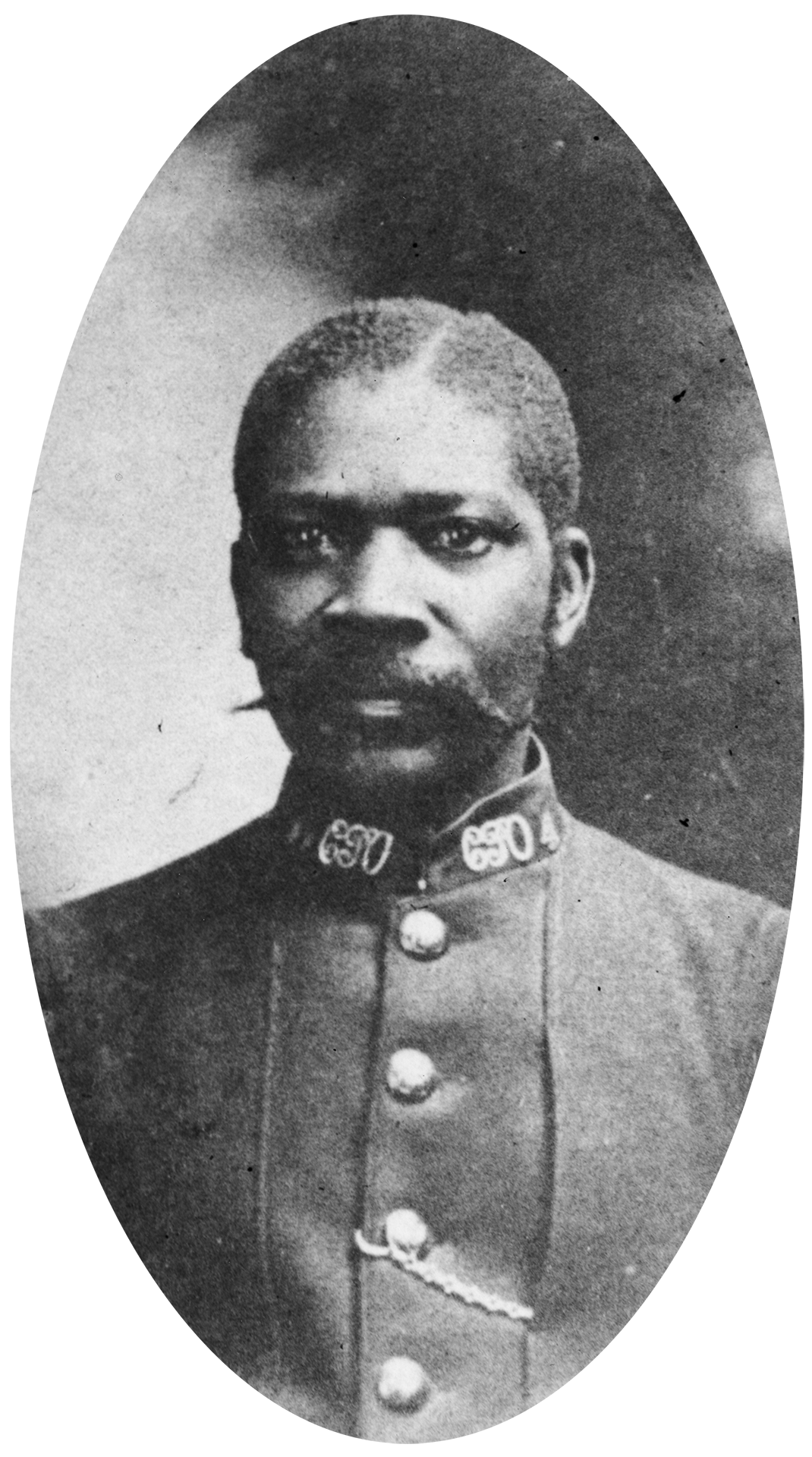
- Born: 2 November 1857; Milford, Delaware, U.S.
- Died: January 14, 1918 (aged 60); Toronto, Ontario, Canada
- Children: 4

Albert Calvin Jackson (2 November 1857 — 14 January 1918) was the first Black Canadian mail carrier in Toronto. Jackson faced discrimination when he started his position in 1882 and was reassigned as mail porter. When the decision was reversed by Prime Minister John A. Macdonald even though it cost him votes in the 1882 Canadian federal election, Jackson continued his mail carrier career from 1882 until his 1918 death. Jackson was posthumously honoured with a plaque by Heritage Toronto in 2017 and a stamp by Canada Post in 2019.

== Personal life ==
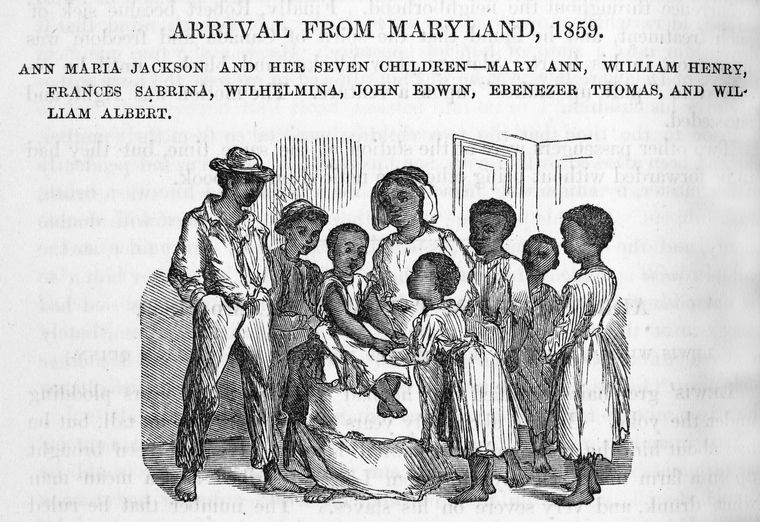
Arrival from Maryland, 1859. Ann Maria Jackson and seven of her children runaway from their slaveholder.

Born in 1857 in Milford, Delaware, Jackson grew up in a family with eight siblings. His parents were John and Ann Maria Jackson. When Jackson was a young child, his older brothers, named Richard and James, were enslaved. In addition to separating the family, it is said that this event led to the death of John Jackson, who later died in a poor house. After learning that four more of her children were to be sold, his mother fled with seven of her children to St. Catharines, Ontario via the Underground Railroad. Ultimately, the two eldest children, Richard and James, were reunited with the family.

Jackson was married and had four children. He died on 14 January 1918.

== Career ==
On 12 May 1882, Jackson began working at the Toronto General Post Office and became the first black mail carrier in Toronto. At the beginning of his career, Jackson was refused training by his post office colleagues and was discriminated against due to racism. Many Blacks at this time did not work in certain occupations because White workers did not want to work with them. They were not accepted as social equals. After he was given his new position of mail porter, Black Canadians living in Toronto during the 1880s objected to Jackson's change of position. The Black community wrote letters to the newspapers in support of Jackson. A Methodist minister from Hamilton, Charles Johnson, published in a Black newspaper called the British Lion. He called the postmen “cowards” and “unworthy the name of Britons” in a letter to the Globe. He made his thoughts clear as he found it absurd to deny Jackson on the account of his colour. Later, Johnson argued that rather than missionaries going to heathen other countries, they should look inward into the letter carriers in Toronto to aid. This issue was highly debated and talked about in Toronto newspapers in the next following weeks. The issue lead to the harassment of Black citizens by Whites on the streets. On May 29, a mass meeting with the city’s African-Canadian community was held at Richmond Street church. The people who attended made it clear that they were not satisfied with the mail porter position and considered it “menial,” in comparison to the mail carrier. To examine the matter, a five person committee became established; they reached out to the surrounding White and Christian community for moral support. The committee appointed G.W. Smith to investigate Jackson’s situation at the post office. One of his main tactics to face this issue was to point to the success of Blacks in other occupations. In a letter to Toronto World, he pointed to Dr. Augusta, a Black surgeon in Ontario, as a successful example. He further noted that other Black inhabitants in Toronto during that time were contractors for building, cabinet makers, blacksmiths and shoemakers. He stated that this situation served as evidence for African Canadians performing under the same circumstances that other races can perform. Even though it cost him votes in the 1882 Canadian federal election, Prime Minister of Canada John A. Macdonald convinced the post office to give Jackson back his job of mail carrier. When Jackson resumed his mail carrier career, he stayed with the post office until his 1918 death.

== Honours ==
In 2013, a street in Toronto's Harbord Village was named Albert Jackson Lane in honour of Jackson. Other posthumous honors include a Heritage Toronto plaque in 2017 and a Canada Post stamp in 2019. In 2022, Canada Post dedicated the Albert Jackson Processing Centre, its new parcel sorting facility in Scarborough, Ontario.
