= Art Museum at the University of Toronto =

Art museum in Toronto, Ontario, Canada

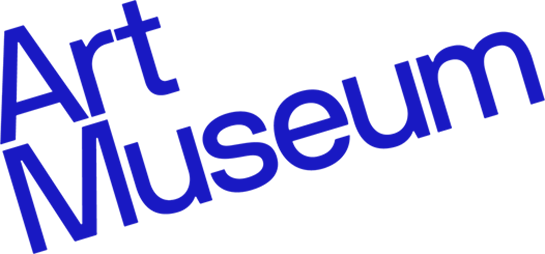

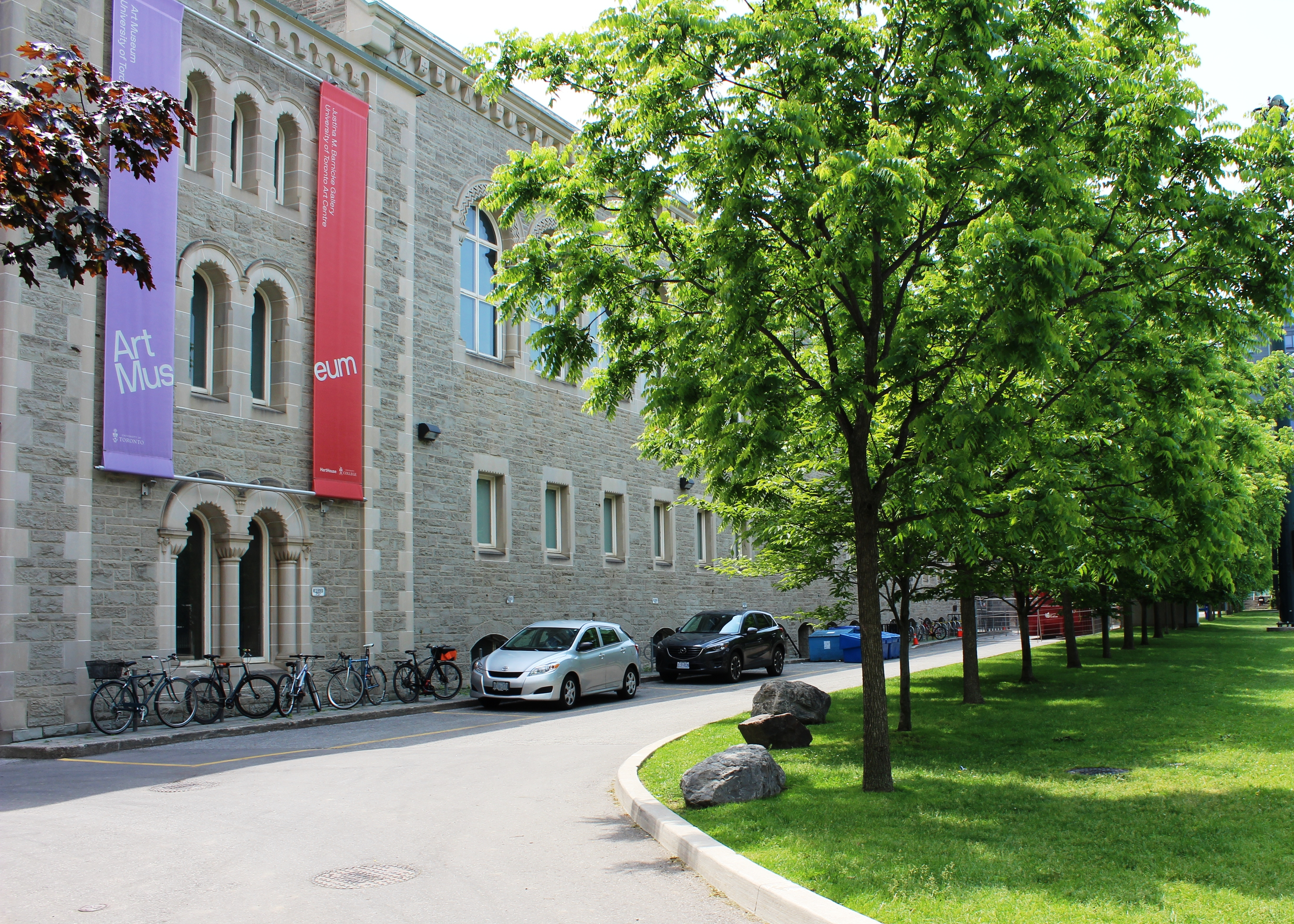
- The University of Toronto Art Centre at University College
- Established: 2014
- Location: Toronto, Ontario, Canada
- Coordinates: 43°39′50″N 79°23′43″W
- Type: University art museum
- Collection size: 8,000+
- Director: Barbara Fischer
- Public transit access: at Museum
- Website: artmuseum.utoronto.ca

The Art Museum at the University of Toronto consists of two galleries on the University of Toronto's St. George campus: the Justina M. Barnicke Gallery at Hart House and the University of Toronto Art Centre at University College. The two federated to form the Art Museum in 2014, with individual history dating back to as early as the 19th century. It is the second largest gallery space for visual art and programming in Toronto after the Art Gallery of Ontario.

The Art Museum features a collection of historical and contemporary Canadian art, dating from 1921 to the present. Exhibits focus on contemporary Canadian art in all media. The gallery also hosts film screenings, lectures and performance art. In addition to its regular exhibitions, the gallery houses an art collection that is valued at over CA$10 million.

Since the official opening in 2016, the museum has been under the direction of Barbara Fischer, an art historian and curator who specializes in contemporary art with an emphasis on sculpture, installation, and projection-based work.

== Collections ==
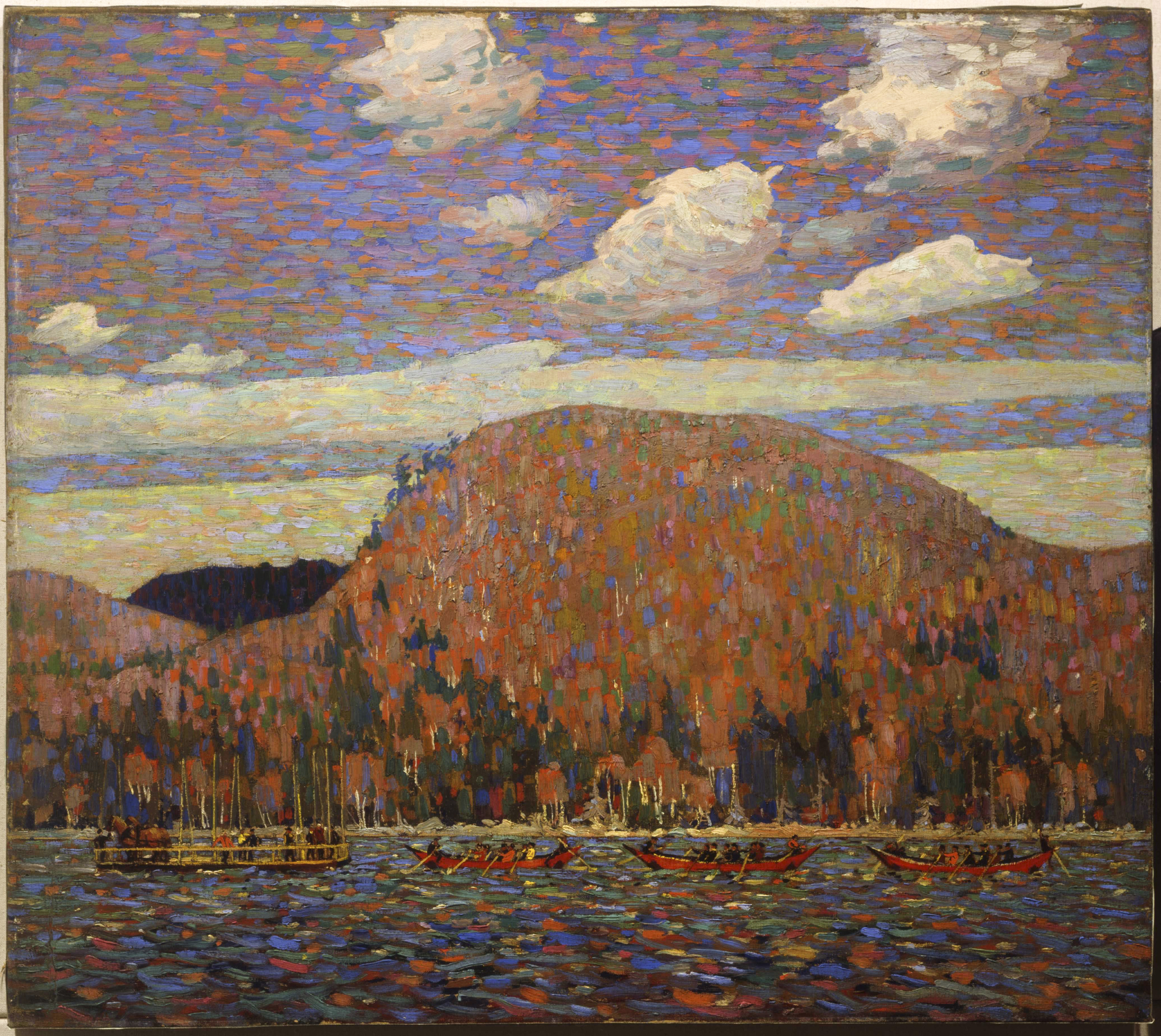
Tom Thomson, The Pointers, Winter 1916–17. 101 x 114.6 cm.

The Art Museum holds over 8,000 pieces in four main collections: The Hart House Collection, Malcove Collection, University College (UC) Collection, and University of Toronto Collection.

The UC Collection is the oldest belonging to the university, with many works donated over the years by members of the college's alumni association dating back to the 19th century. The Hart House Permanent Collection was inaugurated in 1922 by the Hart House Art Committee.

== Justina M. Barnicke Gallery ==
The Justina M. Barnicke Gallery is located in Hart House, the University of Toronto's arts and recreation centre. The gallery was opened in 1983 and manages the Hart House Permanent Art Collection. Hart House sits in the central area of the St. George campus at the former site of McCaul's Pond, artificially created in the 1860s from Taddle Creek.

== University of Toronto Art Centre ==
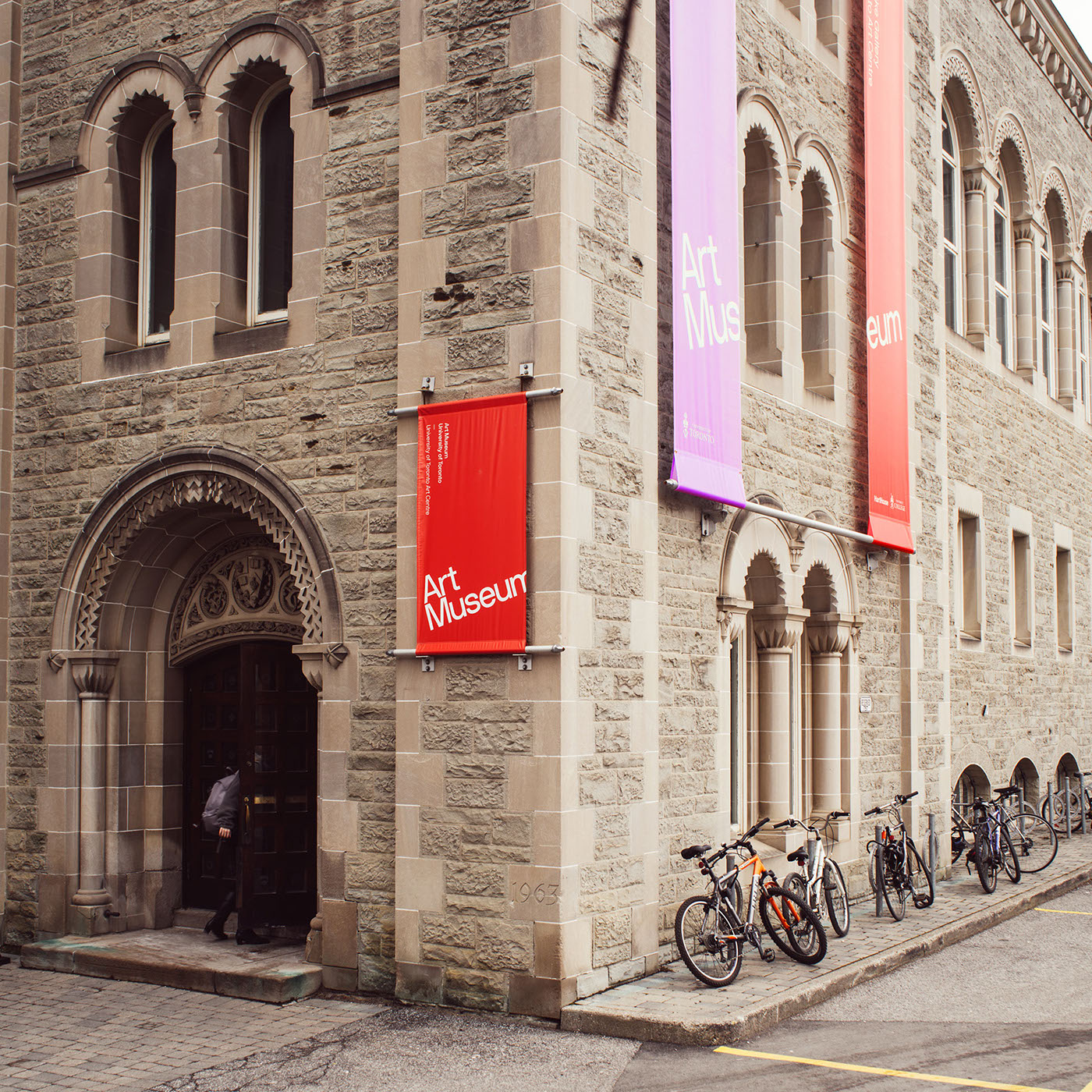
The University of Toronto Art Centre in the Laidlaw Wing of University College

The University of Toronto Art Centre, established in November 1996, is located in the Laidlaw Wing of University College (UC). Following an anonymous donation of CA$2 million, it underwent an expansion which doubled its size to 8,000 square feet of display space and allowed for added storage space and climate control.

== See also ==
- Blackwood Gallery, at the Mississauga campus
- Galeries Ontario / Ontario Galleries
- List of museums in Toronto
- List of art museums
