= Lucie Blackburn =

Former slave

- Born: 1803
- Died: 1895 (aged 91–92); Toronto, Canada

Lucie "Ruthie" Blackburn (1803–1895) was a self-emancipated West-Indian, American former slave who escaped to Canada with her husband Thornton Blackburn and helped him establish the first taxi company in Toronto.

== Early life ==
Lucie was born a slave in Louisville, Kentucky, then known as "Ruthie," "Ruth," or "Rutha." By the age of 28, Lucie was working as a nanny for a merchant family in town. It was at this time that she met and fell in love with her husband, Thornton Blackburn, who was 19. The two got married and were almost separated shortly after when Lucie's slave owners died and she was sold off to a merchant who intended to trade her off in the Deep South. Before she could be auctioned off, however, Lucie and Thornton escaped to Detroit via the Underground Railroad. Thornton lived in Maysville, Kentucky, where he had escaped from his owner in Louisville. Lucie Thorton and her husband took the steamer Versailles up the Ohio River to Cincinnati, Ohio, and boarded for Sandusky, Ohio. It took them 15 days to journey and eventually arrived in Detroit to escape through the Underground Railroad.

== Blackburn Riots ==
In 1833, Thornton was discovered as a fugitive slave in Detroit and he and his wife were arrested. They were jailed on Forth Street when local Black people intervened. Their arrest angered the emerging black populace in Detroit as well as allies of the anti-slavery movement. The Michigan government demanded for Lucie and her husband to return where they were jailed, what is now part of Windsor. Lieutenant Governor Sir John Colborne and his council ordered for the Blackburns to be set free. Their landmark extradition led to the creation of Canada's first refuge reception policy. A woman named Mrs. Madison Lightfoot and the wife of Reverend George French visited Lucie Blackburn when she was in jail. They assisted her by exchanging clothing to take her place, which helped Lucie escape jail. Once she escaped, she was able to cross the Detroit River, entering Ontario, Canada. Thornton was rescued on June 15, 1833, by 400 abolitionists. This mob incited the Blackburn Riot. The rescuers took Thorton from the sheriff's custody to Randolf Street wharf, where an agent exchanged a gold watch for Thornton's freedom and passage. The couple was reunited in Toronto and settled on Eastern Avenue, which became their home of nearly 50 years. This event marked Detroit's first racial protest in history. Both Thornton and Lucie were smuggled out of the United States into Upper Canada, and reunited in Montréal.

== Toronto ==
In 1834, Lucie and Thornton relocated to Toronto where they would spend the rest of their lives. Robert Jameson, an attorney general of Canada, refused to send the Blackburns back to America. This set a precedent that was unaltered until the Emancipation Proclamation of January 1, 1863. Lucie changed her name from her previous enslaved name of "Ruthie" at this time. They devoted their time and wealth to anti-slavery efforts in Canada and support for African-Canadians. Lucie and her husband were prosperous members of the community. The couple did not have children. They participated in anti-slavery and community-building activities. Lucie provided some of the first monies to build Little Trinity Church. Also, she spent time and money helping other freedom seekers settle in their adopted homes.

They also established Toronto's first taxi company by designing a red and yellow horse-drawn carriage that could hold four people, dubbed 'The City'. For a considerable amount of time, the Blackburns held a monopoly on the transit industry before competitors realized its economic value and made their own. In June 1846, there was still a lawsuit initiated by the slave owner against Lucie Blackburn that was still in litigation.

== Later life ==
Lucie retired once the civil war had ended and used interest earned from various investments to supplement income. In 1887 the Sackville Street School was built by the Toronto school board on land taken from the edge of the Blackburn property. That school is now known as Inglenook Community School.

== Legacy ==
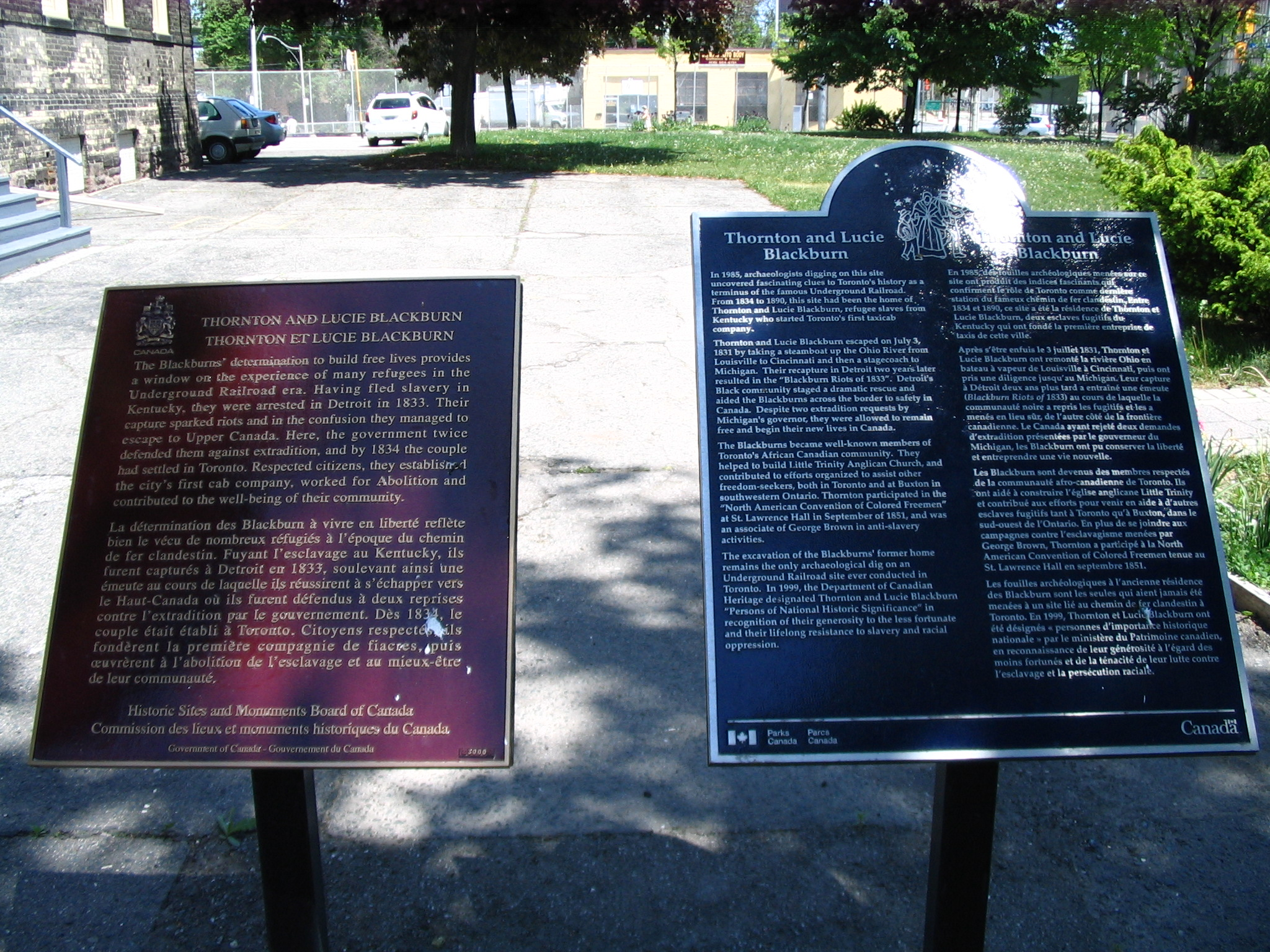
Plaques in Toronto commemorating the Blackburns

In 1985, Karolyn Smardz Frost conducted a site survey for the Archeological Resource Centre of Toronto. It established the Blackburn house as the only fugitive slave residence in the excavated province. There were very few written records of Lucie and Thornton Blackburn's firsthand accounts. However, a team of archeologists in Toronto, Canada found the remnants of a house, barn, and cellar that they learned belonged to the Blackburns unearthed in a schoolyard in 1985. In 1999, the Government of Canada named Lucie and Thornton Persons of National Historic Significance.

George Brown College opened a student residence in 2016 and named its conference centre "The Lucie and Thornton Blackburn Conference Centre" in commemoration.
