= David Hoffos =

Canadian artist

David Hoffos (born 1966 in Montreal, Quebec) is a contemporary artist who maintains a practice in Lethbridge, Alberta. He is widely recognized for unique illusionist installations that draw their inspiration from archaic special effects and cinematic techniques.

He received a Bachelor of Fine Arts degree from the University of Lethbridge in 1994. He has participated in solo and group exhibitions in Canada, Spain, Portugal, Switzerland and the United States. In 2002, he was awarded second place in the prestigious Sobey Art Award.

He has received extensive media coverage in recognized publications like Canadian Art and Border Crossings, as well as television interviews on the CBC.

His projects have been exhibited at numerous galleries including Gallery TPW in Toronto in 2004. There, his exhibition included curtaining off the entire gallery, save a small space in which his projections were shown, allowing only 5 people in at one time.

In 2013, he exhibited "Isachsen, 1948-1978" with artist aAron munson at the Art Gallery of Alberta, and he contributed to munson's Isachsen at dc3 Art Studios again in 2018.
