= Kim Adams =

Canadian artist (born 1951)

- Born: 17 December 1951 (age 74); Edmonton, Alberta
- Education: Northwest Institute of the Arts (1974), the Kootenay School of Art (1974–1975), and the University of Victoria (1975–1977), where he received an MFA in 1979.
- Spouse: Barbara Fischer
- Awards: Gershon Iskowitz Prize (2012), Governor General's Award in Visual and Media Arts (2014)

Kim Adams (born 17 December 1951) is a Canadian sculptor who is known for his assemblages combining prefabricated elements, often parts of cars or other machine-made structures. His visual style is influenced by industrial design, architecture and automotive design. His large-scale sculptures incorporate the model railroading technique of kitbashing, and bright stock colours. They may be shown in a park or street as well as in a museum setting. His small surreal landscapes are toy-sized, and may be installed on shelves.

== Career ==
Adams was born in Edmonton and studied painting at the Northwest Institute of the Arts (1974), the Kootenay School of Art (1974–1975), and the University of Victoria (1975–1977), where he received an MFA in 1979. At the University of Victoria, he was taught by teachers with competing aesthetics, Mowry Baden and Roland Brener. By 1976, Adams was an abstract painter, but knew that sculpture and installation were his future. Despite his formal education, Adams found much of his inspiration outside the classroom.

Adams's sculpture work is composed of different parts: architectural structures, street events and miniature models of landscapes and architecture. His practice grew from creating miniature models in the 1980s to life-size sculptures and installations. In Toaster Work Wagon (1997), Adams assembled bicycles, lawn chairs, and parts of a 1960 Volkswagen bus. For his Autolamp (2008), he used the shell of a 1985 Dodge Ram which through holes which perforate it, gives light, transforming it into a glowing structure. The Mendel Art Gallery (now amalgamated into Remai Modern) acquired Kim Adams' sculpture Love Birds (1998–2010) in 2013 composed of 11 foot tall sculptures - made from water barrels, grain-silo caps, and parts of two Ford Econoline vans.

== Selected exhibitions ==
Since the 1980s, Adams has participated in solo and group exhibitions in Canada, Australia, the United States and Europe. In 1997, Adams participated in the international exhibition Skulptur Projekte 97, Münster, Germany. His major work for that project was Auto Office House, permanently installed on the flat roof of a former 1950s gas station, now the Café Gasolin. More recently, his work was shown at El Geni de Les Coses, Office for Artistic Diffusion (ODA), Barcelona (2009), the 2010 group exhibition Insiders at CAPC musée d'art contemporain, the 2012 Kim Adams: One for the Road show, Museum London, London, Ontario, and at the Art Gallery of Ontario in an exhibition titled Kim Adams: Recent Works in 2013. Adams was represented by Diaz Contemporary, Toronto, where he showed Caboose in 2013 (the gallery closed in 2016). In 2024, the Winnipeg Art Gallery held the exhibition titled Kim Adam: Earth Wagons.

== Selected public collections ==
Adams's work is included in many major public collections such as the Buffalo AKG Art Museum (formerly the Albright-Knox Art Gallery), Art Gallery of Ontario, the National Gallery of Canada, the Remai Modern, and the Centraal Museum in Utrecht, Holland. His Brueghel-Bosch Bus (1997-ongoing, sculpture-installation) is permanently installed at the Art Gallery of Hamilton. In 2001, he created a permanent outdoor work for the Vancouver Art Gallery.

== Honours and awards ==
In 2012, Adams received the Gershon Iskowitz Prize. In 2013, he received a Guggenheim Fellowship, from the John Simon Guggenheim Memorial Foundation. In 2014, Adams won the Governor General's Award in Visual and Media Arts.
