= Jan Allen =

Canadian curator, writer, visual artist, and professor (born 1952)

- Born: 1952 (age 73–74); Windsor, Ontario
- Occupations: Curator, writer, artist, professor
- Style: Contemporary art
- Awards: Royal Canadian Academy of Arts Medal, 2019; Ontario Galleries Lifetime Achievement Award, 2019

Jan Allen (born 1952) is a Canadian curator, writer, visual artist, and assistant professor in the Department of Art History and Art Conservation, and the Cultural Studies Program, at Queen's University, in Kingston, Ontario.

== Early life and education ==
Allen, born in Windsor, Ontario, was raised in Toronto and Mississauga. In 1972, she enrolled in Queen's University at Kingston to study history. She attended the Banff School of Fine Arts (now the Banff Centre for Arts and Creativity) in the 1970s, where her studies were focused in Ceramic History as well as Intermediate and Advanced Ceramics. She was a studio potter from 1974 to 1986.

Allen completed a Bachelor of Arts (with a minor in History) in 1987, a Bachelor of Fine Arts (I Class) in 1990, and a Master of Arts in Art History in 1992; all from Queen's University. She curated art shows during and after her education, including at the Agnes Etherington gallery. She was hired as an associate curator at the Agnes Etherington gallery in 1992 and became curator of contemporary art in 1995.

== Curatorial work ==
Allen's curatorial focus includes contemporary art with a concentration in Canadian art and her research interests include new media art, electronic media art, socially and politically engaged art, the exhibitionary complex, and arts policy.

As Chief Curator and Curator of Contemporary Art, at the Agnes Etherington Art Centre in Kingston, Allen has overseen numerous exhibitions, publications and programs since 1992. She became Acting Director at the Agnes Etherington in 2012 and was appointed Director in 2014. Since she became Director, the Agnes Etherington Art Centre has won several awards, and has nearly doubled its funding from the Canada Council for the Arts.

Select projects include Museopathy (2001), Better Worlds: Activist and Utopian Projects by Artists (2002), and Machine Life (2004).

Allen joined the Board of the Ontario Association of Art Galleries in 2012. She also serves on, and has chaired, the Arts Advisory Committee of the City of Kingston, its Visual Arts Working Group, and the Advocacy Committee of the Kingston Arts Council.

Allen has served on the Canada Council for the Arts Standing Peer Advisory Committee on International Exhibitions, and the Advisory Committee of the School of Image Arts, Ryerson University in Toronto, Ontario.

== Visual art practice and select solo exhibitions ==
- Speculative Science, Carleton University Art Gallery, 1999. In the exhibition catalogue, Sandra Dyck examines how Allen's sculptural works evoke relationships between biological, psychological and technological aspects of identity. Other subjects discussed include Allen's work in relation to themes of biotechnology, hybridity, and cybernetics.
- Terminal, Edward Day Gallery, Kingston, Ontario, 1996.
- Oblivion Station, Modern Fuel Gallery, Kingston, Ontario, 1996.
- In Heaven, Blackwood Gallery, Erindale College, Mississauga, Ontario, 1996.
- Trophy, State of Flux Gallery, Kingston, Ontario, 1994.
- Racing Inevitability, Kingston Artists' Association Gallery, Kingston, Ontario, 1991.
- Playing with Fire, Grad Club, Kingston, Ontario, 1991.
- St. Lawrence College, Brockville, Ontario.

== Select curatorial work ==
- Geoffrey James: Inside Kingston Penitentiary, 2014.
- Allen, Jan (2011). Annie Pootoogook: Kinngait compositions. Pootoogook, Annie, 1969–2016., Agnes Etherington Art Centre. Kingston, Ont.: Agnes Etherington Art Centre. ISBN 9781553392606. OCLC 726821296.
- Allen, Jan (2010). Sorting daemons: art, surveillance regimes and social control. Goldstein, Brenda., Robertson, Kirsty, 1976–, Smith, Sarah, 1983–, Agnes Etherington Art Centre. Kingston, Ont.: Agnes Etherington Art Centre, Queen's University. ISBN 9781553392538. OCLC 471042720.
- Carole Conde and Karl Beveridge: Working Culture, 2008.
- Joyce Wieland: Twilit Record of Romantic Love, 1993.

== Selected publications ==
Allen has contributed essays and reviews to publications such as Prefix Photo, C Magazine, Artexte, and Poliester. Other essays include:

- "David Askevold: Once Upon a Time in the East," Prefix Photo, Issue 26, Autumn-Winter 2012.
- "Marlene Creates: Interrogative Movement," Prefix Photo, Issue 19, Spring-Summer 2009.
- "Self-destroying Postcard Worlds: The Synthetic Landscapes of Isabelle Hayeur," Prefix Photo, Issue 19, Autumn-Winter 2005.
- "Letting Go: the fall in contemporary art," C Magazine, Issue 58, May–August 1998.
- "Reinventing the Mega Show: Europe's first Manifesta," C Magazine, Issue 52, February–April 1997.

Allen's poetry has been published in journals and anthologies and includes a cyber-punk inspired collection Personal Peripherals (2006).

== Awards ==
Allen received the OAC (Ontario Arts Council) Exhibition Assistance Grant in 1999, 1998, 1993–1995, and 1991, respectively. From 1994 to 1995, she held the Canada Council B Grant in Visual Arts.

Allen received a First Prize for Sculpture at the Queen's University Arts Fest in 1990 and the First Prize at St. Lawrence College's Environmental Art Show in 1992. In 1994 she received an Ontario Arts Council Visual Arts Grant.

In 2002, Allen accepted the 2002 Exhibition of the Year award from the Ontario Association of Art Galleries (OAAG), as the Coordinating Curator of Museopathy. The exhibition was recognized for its innovative and multi-site exhibition of regional, national and international artists' installations.

She was also the recipient of an educator award for her professional development of Exposures, at the Agnes Etherington Art Centre in 2008 (with Katrina Enros and Pat Sullivan). In 2009, she received an OAAG award for curatorial writing, for her chapter entitled "Working Culture" in the book Condé and Beveridge: Class Works (NSCAD Press, 2008).

In 2019 she was the sole recipient of the Royal Canadian Academy of Arts Medal. Also in 2019 she was given a lifetime achievement award from Ontario Galleries.
