= Germaine Koh =

Canadian artist (born 1967)

- Born: 1967 (age 58–59); George Town, Malaysia
- Education: University of Ottawa; Hunter College
- Occupation: Conceptual artist
- Years active: 1991–present
- Relatives: Graham Verchere (nephew)
- Awards: VIVA award
- Website: www.germainekoh.com

Germaine Koh (born 1967) is a Malaysian-born and Canadian conceptual artist based in Vancouver. Her works incorporate the artistic styles of neo-conceptual art, minimalism, and environmental art, and is concerned with the significance of everyday actions, familiar objects and common places.

Koh is an independent curator and partner in the independent record label Weewerk. She also used to be an assistant curator of contemporary art at the National Gallery of Canada. Her exhibition history includes the Baltic Centre (Newcastle), De Appel (Amsterdam), Musée d'art contemporain de Montréal, Para/Site Art Space (Hong Kong), Frankfurter Kunstverein, Bloomberg Space (London), The Power Plant (Toronto), Seoul Museum of Art, Artspace (Sydney), The British Museum (London), the Contemporary Art Gallery (Vancouver), Plug In ICA (Winnipeg), Art Gallery of Ontario (Toronto), and the Liverpool, Sydney and Montréal biennials.

== Early life and education ==
Koh was born in George Town, Malaysia. She emigrated to Canada with her family at the age of two and was raised in Armstrong, British Columbia. Koh received her Bachelor of Fine Arts in studio in 1989 and theory and history of art in 1990 at the University of Ottawa. She later obtained a Master of Fine Arts in 1993 from Hunter College in New York.

== Art career ==
Koh's work draws the use of everyday objects and familiar concepts in order to examine how people interact with those they encounter while moving through the world. For example, her piece "Call", is an old telephone in a public space. When the phone is picked up it randomly dials a number of a participant that has agreed to have conversations with strangers at any time of the day.

There isn't a typical "Germaine Koh" piece - she utilizes many different materials for every piece she creates, yet each piece encompasses an ideology, perhaps best said by Koh herself in a Rhizome.org interview:

I would characterize my work as a whole as an attempt to be attentive to the poetics of daily life by focusing on those phenomena that shape everyday experience, often slightly below the threshold of notice (and, yes, value)

== Artistic styles and works ==
Germaine Koh, Knitwork, 1992, unraveled used garment reknit into growing object. This view: 1998 Biennale of Sydney

Koh's work encompasses the artistic styles of conceptual art, environmental art, and minimalism. In an on-going work titled Knitwork (1992–present), Koh unravels used garments and re-knits the materials into one larger and constantly evolving object. This piece demonstrates characteristics of environmental art through Koh's use of recycled materials and the ways in which she turns used and discarded items into a working piece of art. In a similar artwork called Lumber (1991–1994, dispersed 2002), Koh makes use of flexible pieces of recuperated lumber glazed with oil and marine varnish to be installed alongside select architecture. Various projects by Koh are also collaborative or rely on the active participation of its audiences. One example of such works include an art gallery titled "ad hoc gallery" which was put on display in collaboration with Geoffrey Brown from 1993–1994. An example of one which incorporates its participants into the art piece itself is League, which began in 2012 and is categorized as a "participatory project". Koh describes League as "an open group of people who gather regularly to play sports and games invented or conceived by members of the community ... The project is founded in a belief in the value of emergent behaviour and the process of making sense of things." Koh emphasizes games, sport, and play as forms of problem-solving which focus on the mental over the physical and the processes of learning, adapting, and evolution through iteration as central to the overall concept of the project.

Koh combines both making use of discarded or found items and active participation in a project called Sightings (1992–1998), which involved the commercial printing and publishing of images found in public as postcards. These postcards closely interacted with the individuals they reached, drawing emphasis on the ideas of making art out of common everyday objects and experiences as well as recognizing the uniqueness of common places.

=== Other projects ===
In addition to her artistic work, Koh is co-founder of the Toronto-based record label and artist-management company Weewerk. She is also an athlete. Koh played varsity volleyball and badminton at the University of Ottawa and is a former captain of roller derby team the Terminal City All-Stars. Her interest in the relationship between creativity and athleticism resulted in the creation of The Koh-Verchere Award for Athletic and Creative Excellence, an Emily Carr University of Art and Design student award, and the establishment of Vancouver's League. Koh was part of the design team for the No. 2 Road North Drainage Pump Station in Richmond, British Columbia, which was awarded the Public Works Association of British Columbia 2018 Project of the Year award. In 2018, Koh became the first artist-in-residence in the City of Vancouver engineering department.

== Solo exhibitions ==
- Crowd Shyness, Morris and Helen Belkin Gallery, Vancouver, 17 July–16 August 2020
- Home Made Home, Evergreen Cultural Centre, 14 September–4 November 2018
- Home Made Home, Richmond Art Gallery, 17 June–26 August 2018, Curated by Nan Caponga.
- Home Made Home, Kelowna Art Gallery, Kelowna BC, Curator: Liz Wylie.
- Lively Objects: Enchantment and Disruption, Museum of Vancouver, 16 August 2015
- FUSE, Vancouver Art Gallery, 29 November 2013
- Culture + Community Symposium, Vancouver, 26 October 2013
- Germaine Koh: Weather Systems, Kamloops Art Gallery, Kamloops 6 April to 15 June 2013
- Germaine Koh - Knitwork; Germaine Koh/Gordon Hicks - There|Here, Galerie B-312, Montreal 2012
- The Haunting, Invaliden 1 Galerie, Berlin, 2010
- Fallow, Charles H Scott Gallery, Vancouver BC, February–March 2009
- Germaine Koh, Catriona Jeffries Gallery, Vancouver BC, April–May 2008
- Overflow, Centre A, Vancouver BC, January–February 2007
- Germaine Koh: Call and Relay, Video Pool, Winnipeg MB, October–November 2007
- Germaine Koh, Ottawa Art Gallery, Ottawa ON, August–October 2006
- Relay: an intervention into the fabric of the Baltic building, Baltic Centre for Contemporary Art, July–September 2005
- Marks and Relay, Tate Biennial, Tate Liverpool, Liverpool, England, 2004
- Germaine Koh: about around, Gallery One One One, University of Manitoba, Winnipeg, Manitoba 30 November 2001 - 11/12 January 2002
- Germaine Koh, Contemporary Art Gallery, Vancouver 5 May 2001 – 15 July 2001
- Germaine Koh: Shell, Catriona Jeffries Gallery, Vancouver, BC, January–February 2005.
- Angel Row Gallery, Knitwork, Sep-Nov 2005. PDF
- Germaine Koh: Shell, Para/Site Art Space, Hong Kong, 2004
- Germaine Koh: Opening Hours, McMaster Museum of Art, Hamilton, ON, 2002.
- Germaine Koh, Catriona Jeffries Gallery, Vancouver, BC, April–June 2002.
- Knitwork, The British Museum, London, UK, Feb-Apr 2002. Performance/installation related to conference "From Material Things: art and artefact in the 21st century". Curator: James Putnam & Gabriela Salgado.
- Germaine Koh: Around/About, Contemporary Art Gallery, Germaine Koh, Vancouver, BC, May–July 2001. Curator: Keith Wallace.
- Solo Exhibition, Watch, Toronto, ON, 5–7 February 2001. Curator: Barr Gilmore.
- Southern Alberta Art Gallery, Germaine Koh: Knitwork, 1997.
- Knitwork, 1996.
- Knitwork, 1995.
- Knitwork/Tricot-âge, September–November 1993.

== Group exhibitions ==
- The Structure of Smoke, Morris and Helen Belkin Art Gallery, 9 January–12 April 2026.
- Soundings: An Exhibition in Five Parts, Morris and Helen Belkin Art Gallery, 8 September–6 December 2020.
- City of Vancouver Engineering Artist in Residence, 2018–2020.
- Split Between the I and the Gaze, Agnes Etherington Art Centre, 24 August–1 December 2019.
- Public Volumes. Small Arms Inspection Building, Mississauga, 2019. Curator: Noa Bronstein.
- Kuenstlerhaus Palais Thurn & Taxis, Silvrett Atelier Montafon 2018. Bregenz AT, 2019.
- 'Afterlives, Or Gallery, 25 November 2017 – 3 February 2018
- 'Persistence, Vancouver Art Gallery, 24 June 2017 – 1 October 2017
- This is it with it as it is, group exhibition at AHVA Gallery, 23 November 2016 – 14 January 2017
- (im)mobile exhibition, Haus für Kunst Uri, 5 March–15 May 2016
- (im)mobile, two-person show with Edith Flückiger, Dalhousie Art Gallery, Curator: Mireille Bourgeois & Chantal Molleur 17 October–30 November 2014
- Les matins infidèles: l'art du protocole, Musée national des beaux-arts du Québec, Curator: Bernard Larmarche November 2013–September 2014
- Scotiabank Nuit Blanche one A: Restaging the Encounter, Curator: Candice Hopkins, City of Toronto, 5 October 2013
- There/Here: Germain Koh and Gordon Hicks, Surrey Art Gallery, Surrey, BC, 2011. Participants: with Gordon Hicks. Curator: Jordan Strom.
- Sorting Daemons: Art, Surveillance Regimes & Social Control, Agnes Etherington Art Centre, Kingston, ON, January–April 2010. Participants: with Ian Verchere. Curator: Jan Allen & Sarah E.K. Smith.
- Luminato Festival of Arts + Creativity, Luminato Festival 2009, Toronto, ON, June 2009.
- How Soon Is Now, Vancouver Art Gallery, Vancouver, BC, February–May 2009. Curator: Kathleen Ritter.
- Here Now or Nowhere, Prairie Art Gallery, Grande Prairie, AB, January 2009. Art in public places. Curator: Micah Lexier.
- Schematic: New Media Art from Canada, [space], London, UK, November–December 2008. Curator: Michelle Kasprzak, Gillian McIver & Heather Corcoran.
- All Together Now: Recent Toronto Art, Art Gallery of Ontario, Toronto, ON, November 2008–Spring 2009. Installation of works from the permanent collection. Curator: Michelle Jacque
- Untethered, eyebeam, New York, September–October 2008. Curator: Sarah Cook
- This Particular Day of June, Or Gallery, Vancouver, BC, May–June 2008. Curator: Jonathan Middleton.
- On Being An Exhibition, Artists Space, New York, October–December 2007. Curator: Joseph del Pesco
- Ingenuity Festival, Ingenuity Festival 2007, Cleveland, OH, 2007. Curator: Steve Dietz
- f.city, Folly, Lancaster, UK, September–October 2006.
- 2004 Sobey Art Award Exhibition, Mackenzie Art Gallery, Regina, SK, July–September 2006.
- Territory, Artspeak and Presentation House Gallery, Vancouver, BC, June–August 2006.Curator: Melanie O'Brian & Helga Pakasaar.
- Temporary Import / Vorübergehende Einfuhr, Art Forum Berlin, Berlin, September 2005. Curator: Susanne Titz.
- 2004 Sobey Art Award Exhibition, Museum of Contemporary Canadian Art, Toronto, ON, September–November 2005
- 2004 Sobey Art Award Exhibition, Art Gallery of Greater Victoria, Victoria, BC, July–August 2005.
- L'envers des apparences, Musée d'art contemporain de Montréal, Montreal, QC, Summer 2005. Curator: Gilles Godmer.
- 2004 Sobey Art Award Exhibition, Yukon Arts Centre, Whitehorse, YK, March–May 2005.
- 2004 Sobey Art Award, Art Gallery of Nova Scotia, Exhibition, Halifax, NS, October–December 2004.
- Sense, Edmonton Art Gallery (now Art Gallery of Alberta), Edmonton, AB, September–November 2004. Curator: Catherine Crowston.
- Entre ciel et terre - Biennale nationale de sculpture contemporaine 2004, Galerie d'Art du Parc, Trois-Rivières, QC, June–August 2004. Curator: Gaston St-Pierre.

== Personal life ==
Koh has 25 years of leadership with non-profit organizations. She has been coaching roller derby since 2010. In 2015, Koh established the program for a new competitive team, the Terminal City B-Sides.

She was the Chef de Mission of Team Canada Roller Derby from 2017 to 2018, where she was responsible for the team's strategic vision and organizational development.

Koh has a multi-sport background which includes five years of experience playing for the varsity badminton team at the University of Ottawa. She also played roller derby for five years under the derby name "PLAYER 1" before captaining the Terminal City All-Stars.

== Legacy and influence ==
The project by Koh and Geoffrey Brown titled "ad hoc gallery" received a review from Gunter Nolte, Visual Arts Department Head at University of Ottawa, as he comments "They are making an enormous contribution to the community art scene. They are so committed they finance the gallery from their own jobs." An aspect of the City of Vancouver's engineering art residence is bringing the community together to determine what they would like to see happen for buildings, pipes, public spaces, and also demolitions. An example of this would be the "sewer time capsule" which was created 13 July 2019. This brought together members of the community to paint on a pipe that was then used as sewer upgrades in the area which would stay in use for the next hundred years. Koh herself said "The community can always feel like they had a little part to play in the infrastructure that lies below their street, and it's a concrete connection with sewer works that also serves to demystify infrastructure."

== Awards ==
In 2004, Koh was a finalist for the Sobey Art Award and in 2010 she won a VIVA Award in recognition of her outstanding achievement as a mid-career artist in British Columbia.

Awarded the 2023 Governor General's Award in Visual and Media Arts for Artistic Achievement.

== Publications ==
- Germaine Koh (2001), Germaine Koh and Keith Wallace, Contemporary Art Gallery (Vancouver, BC). ISBN 9780920751800
- Germaine Koh/Stall (2004), Germaine Koh, Para/Site Art Space (Hong Kong).
- Overflow: Germaine Koh (2007), Germaine Koh, Centre A - Vancouver International Centre for Contemporary Asian Art (Vancouver, BC). ISBN 9780973271157
- Opening hours: Germaine Koh (2002) Steven Reinke and Rosemary Heather, McMaster Museum of Art (Hamilton). ISBN 9781894088367
