= Agnes Etherington Art Centre =

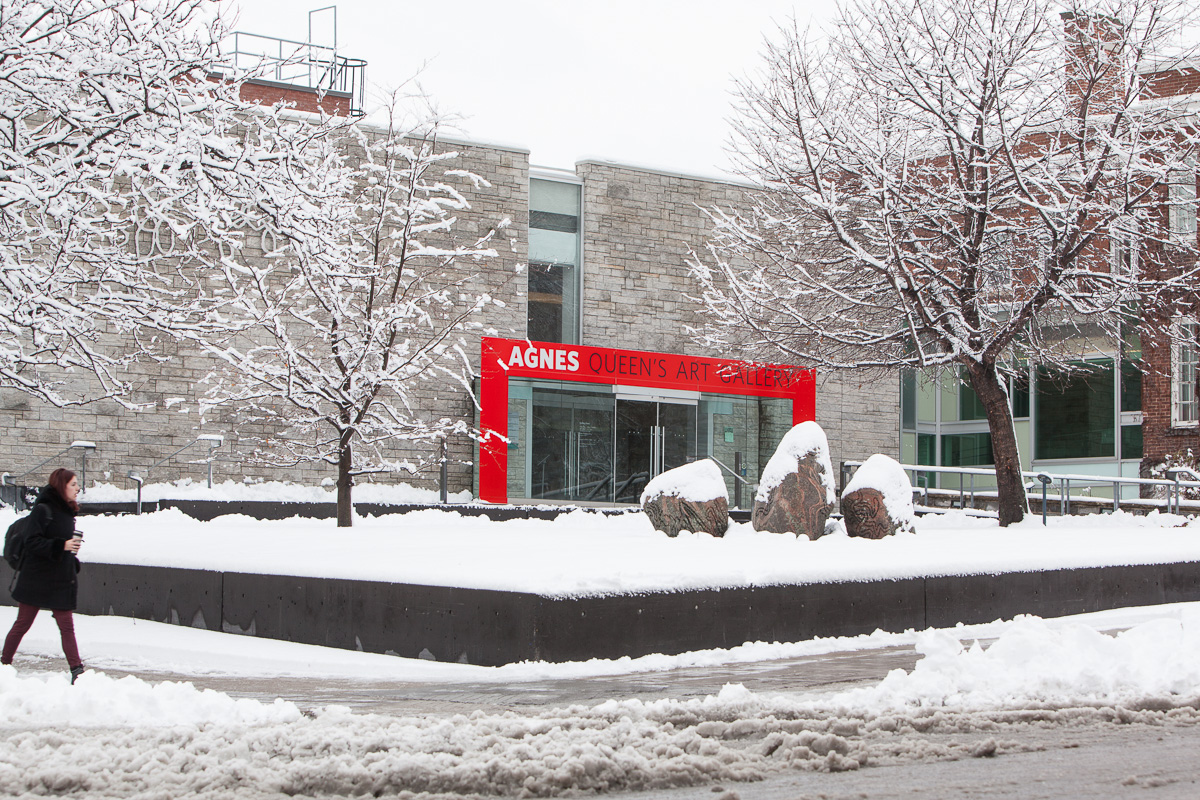

- Location within Southern Ontario
- Established: 1957
- Location: 36 University Avenue, Kingston, Ontario, Canada
- Coordinates: 44°13′31.4″N 76°29′46.5″W
- Type: Art museum
- Director: Emelie Chhangur
- Website: agnes.queensu.ca

The Agnes Etherington Art Centre is located in Kingston, Ontario, on the campus of Queen's University. The gallery has received a number of awards for its exhibitions from the Canada Council for the Arts, the Ontario Association of Art Galleries and others.

== History ==
The Agnes Etherington Art Centre has its roots in the Kingston Art and Music Club, founded in 1926, and owes its existence to Agnes McCausland Richardson Etherington (1880–1954), a driving force behind the club. Agnes Etherington's grandfather had founded the grain dealer James Richardson & Sons in 1857 and the family had become very wealthy. Agnes's brother George Richardson, who died fighting in World War I in 1916, left a legacy for her to use as she felt fit to stimulate development of the arts at Queen's University. She used this to found the George Taylor Richardson Memorial Fund, which still provides an important source of arts funding to the university.

Agnes Etherington bequeathed her house, an elegant Neo-Georgian mansion, to Queen's University for use as a university and community art gallery. The Agnes Etherington Art Centre opened to the public in 1957. The building was extended in 1962, 1975, 1978 and 2000, and now has an area of 1,720 square metres.

== Facilities ==
In addition to the historical Etherington House and nine galleries, the Agnes Etherington Art Centre features a studio, atrium, a publications lounge and the David McTavish Art Study Room.

== Events and public programs ==
Through the fall and winter, lectures, discussions, tours, custom seminars and screenings. Each summer, the gallery offers an art-intensive summer day camp for children and an art course of teens.

== Collections ==
Agnes Etherington Art Centre holds over 17,000 works ranging from the 14th century to the present, placing it among the largest galleries in Ontario. It includes paintings, sculptures, and graphics by major Canadian artists, European old master paintings, African art, historical dress, quilts, silver and decorative art.

=== Canadian historical art ===
The Canadian Historical collection primarily representing the history of Canadian fine art in the Euro-American tradition, it also reflects the evolving Canadian cultural matrix through Inuit and Indigenous art and artifacts, as well as historic dress and decorative arts. The collection is notable for fine early topographical watercolours and major 20th-century paintings, and encompasses material connected to regional history in the Queen's University Collection of Canadian Dress, the Heritage Quilt Collection, and the Silver Collection. The Canadian historical collection includes works by: Andre Charles Bieler, Tom Thomson, Emily Carr, Lawren Harris, Arthur Lismer, Frederick Varley, Edwin Holgate, LeMoine FitzGerald, Fernand Leduc, Ozias Leduc, David Milne, William Ronald, Carl Beam, William Henry Bartlett, William Brymner, Kananginak Pootoogook, Pitseolak Ashoona

=== Contemporary art ===
The Contemporary Art Collection features visual art, with emphasis on the emerging generation of artists and works that reflect contemporary life and Canadian society. It is national in scope. The Contemporary collection includes works by: Charles Stankievech, Rebecca Belmore, Judy Radul, Brendan Fernandes, Luis Jacob, Vera Frenkel, David Rokeby, Norman White, Robert Houle, Shary Boyle, AA Bronson, General Idea, Ian Carr-Harris, Sarindar Dhaliwal, Andre Fauteux, Kim Ondaatje, Derek Sullivan

=== Historical European art ===
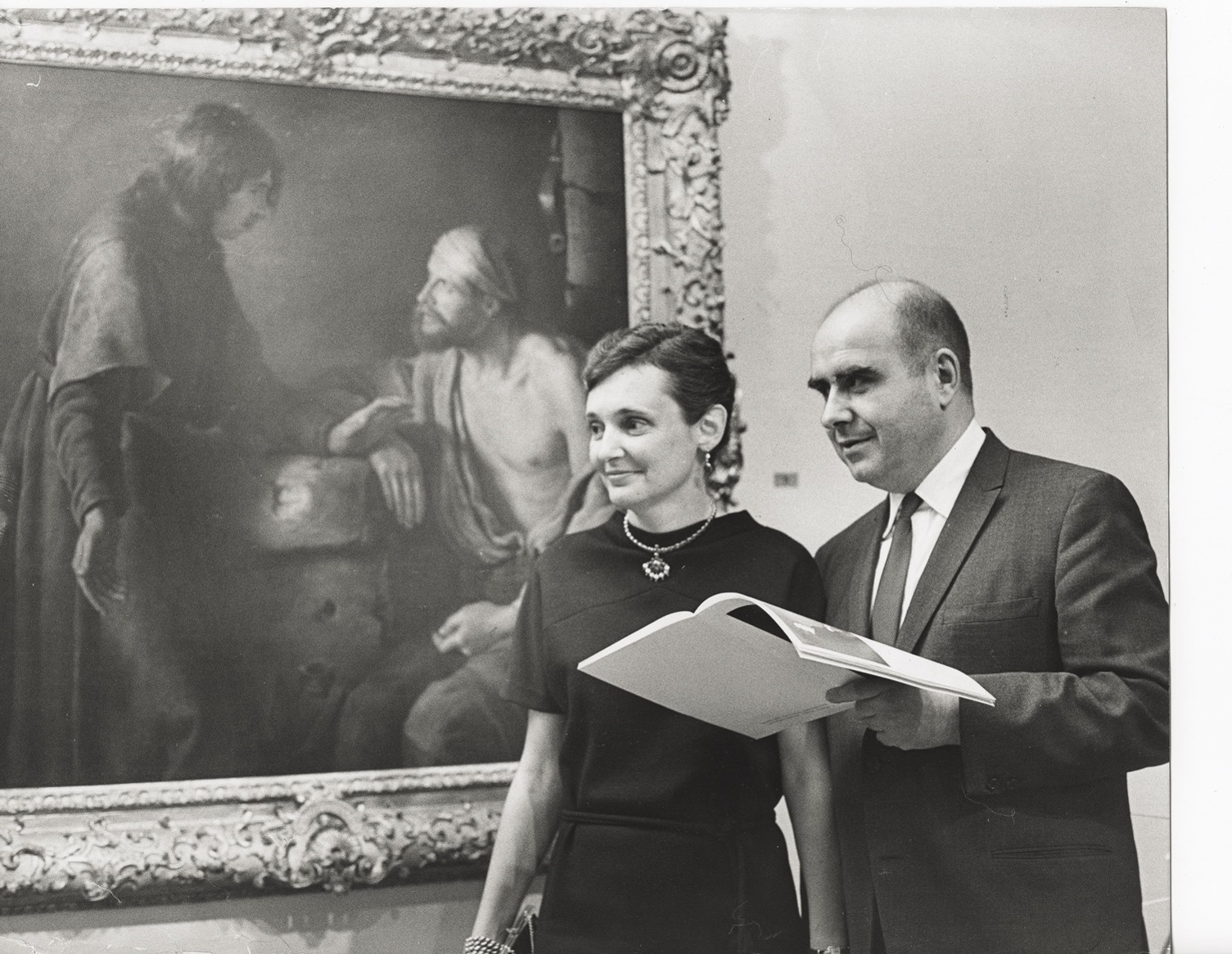
Alfred Bader with his first wife Helen, who wrote the first catalog of their collection in 1974. Here shown standing before a painting they gifted to their son David.

The European Art Collection holds many paintings, prints, and drawings of exceptional quality and depth. The heart of the European collection is the Bader collection, with over 200 paintings donated by philanthropist Alfred Bader together with his first wife Helen, and later together with his second wife Isabel. The Baders also gifted the Bader Acquisition Fund to enable the museum to make additional purchases, and the Bader Chair in Northern Baroque Art. Alfred Bader's first donated painting in 1967 was a Salvator Mundi once owned by his mother. Most of the paintings he and Helen collected during the 1970s were religious scenes by Dutch and Flemish artists, a hobby he continued with his second wife Isabel in the 1980s, though by that time the couple was actively shopping across Europe for paintings they could directly donate to the museum with an eye to expanding the collection for educational purposes. Isabel had been a teacher in a girls' school in Bexhill-on-Sea for over 25 years and had become an expert in historical clothing and textiles. She donated her collection of historical costumes in the 1970s to the museum in Bexhill-on-Sea and founded a drama school there. It was thanks to her that Herstmonceux Castle later became the couple's gift in 1993 to Queen's University as the couple returned often to Bexhill-on-Sea and were enthusiastic upon hearing the nearby castle was for sale. After Alfred passed in 2018 Isabel continued to make donations from the couple's collection to Agnes Etherington Art Centre, and her bequest in 2022 included 44 paintings and was valued at a breathtaking $12 million dollars.

==== Paintings from the Bader collection ====
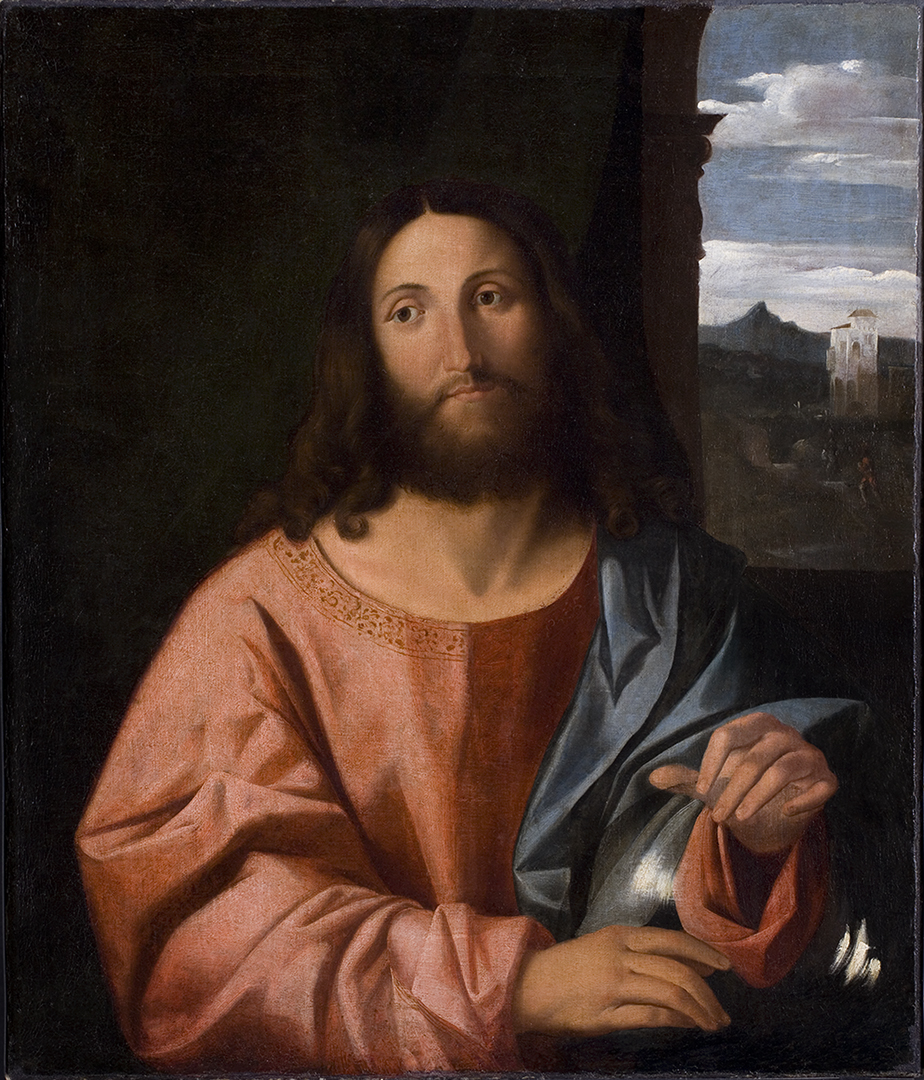
Girolamo da Santacroce, Salvator Mundi, c. 1520s

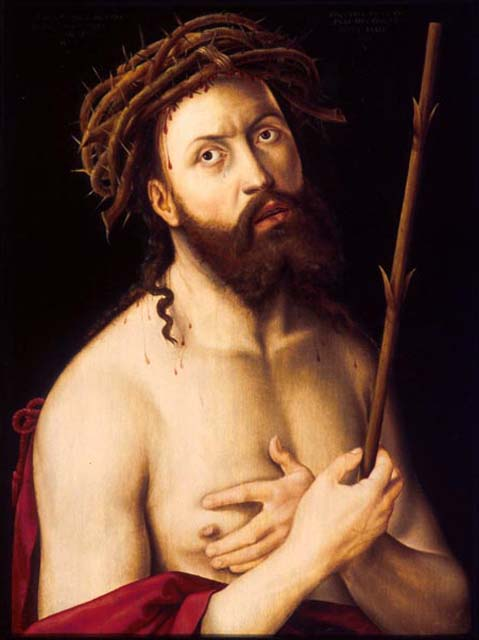
Georg Pencz, Ecce Homo, 1538

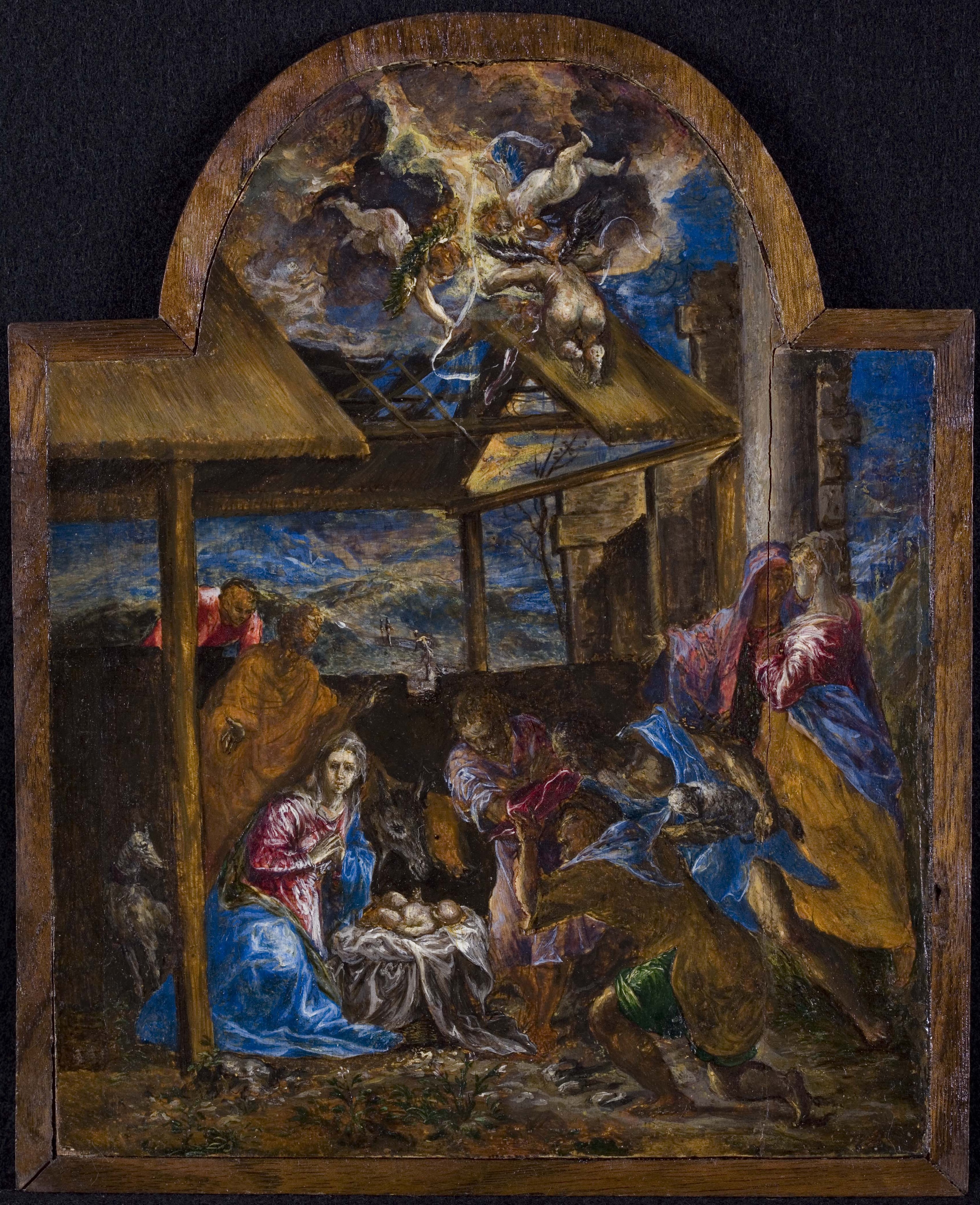
El Greco, The Adoration of the Shepherds, 1570

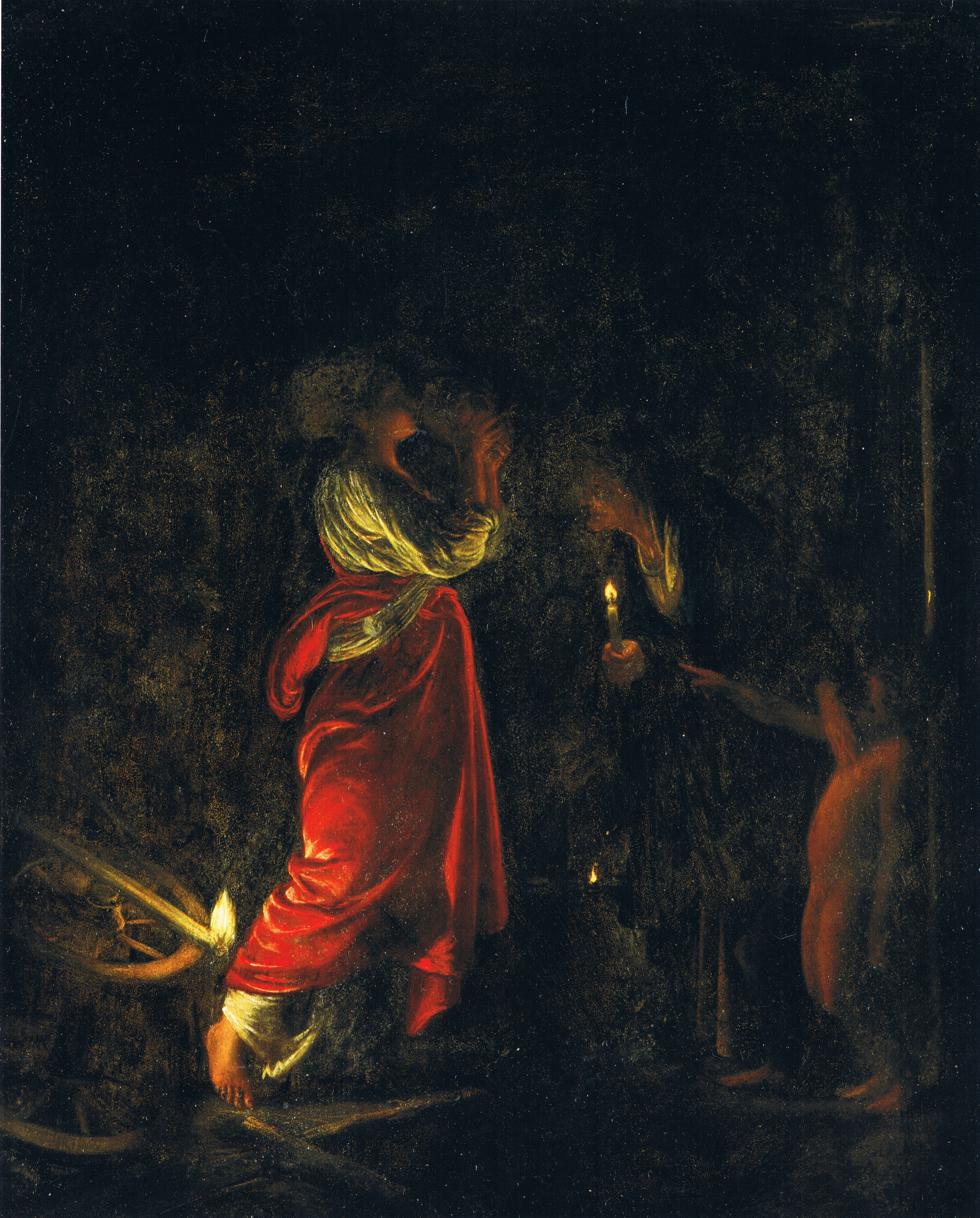
Adam Elsheimer, The Mocking of Ceres, c. 1605

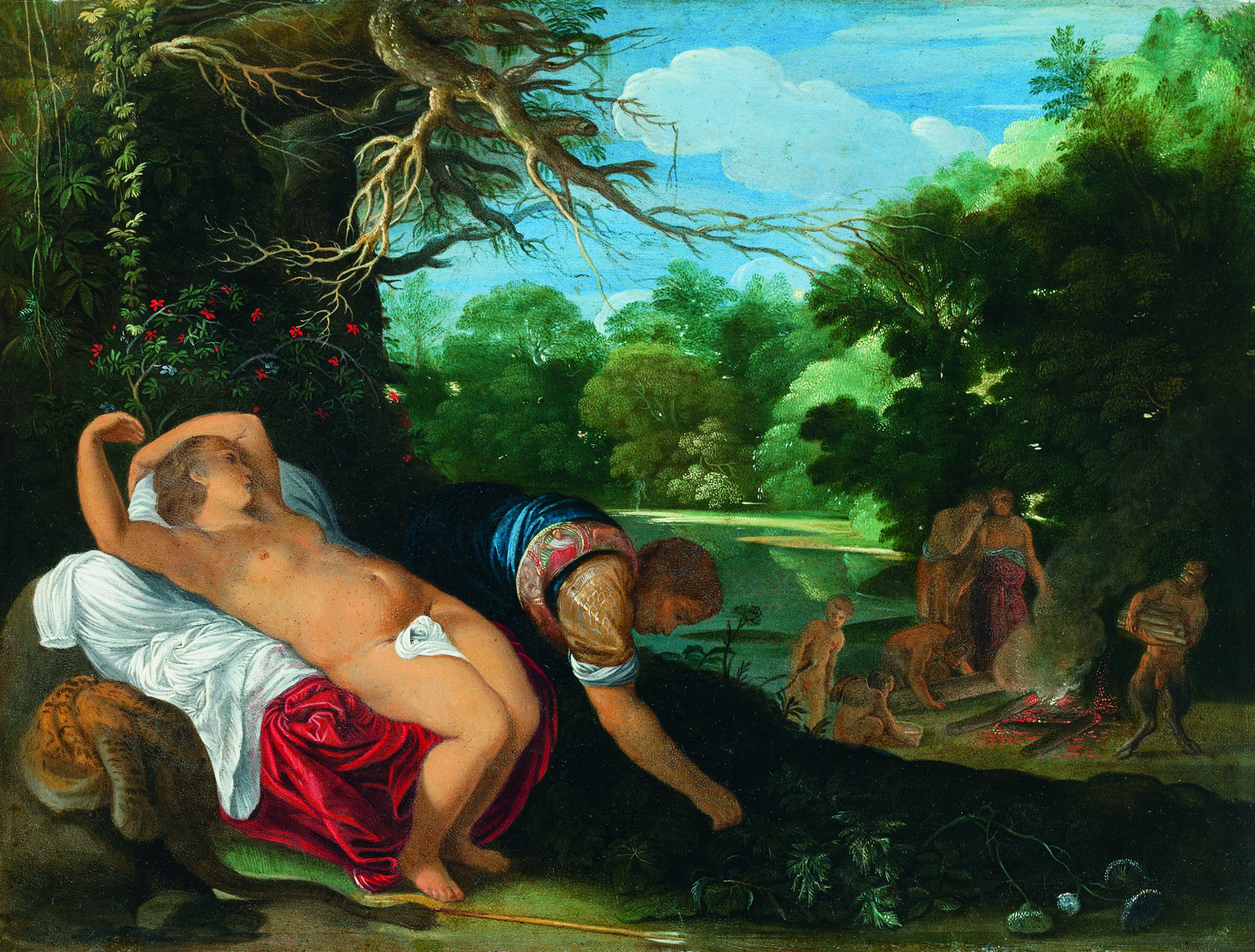
Johann König (after Elsheimer), Apollo and Coronis, c. 1607

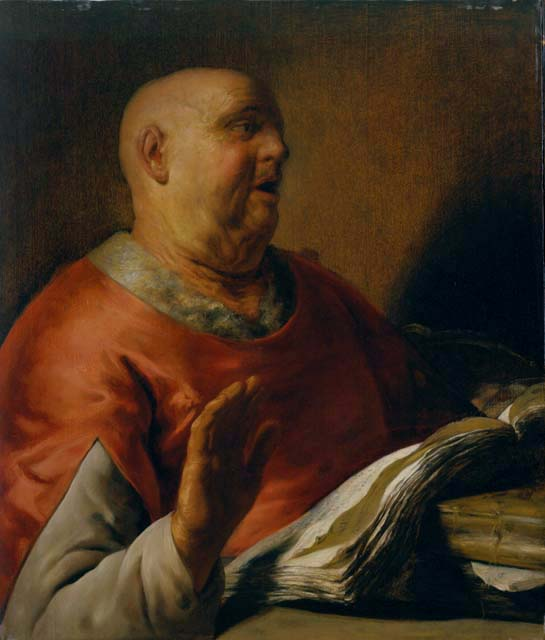
Jan Lievens, A Man Singing, c. 1624

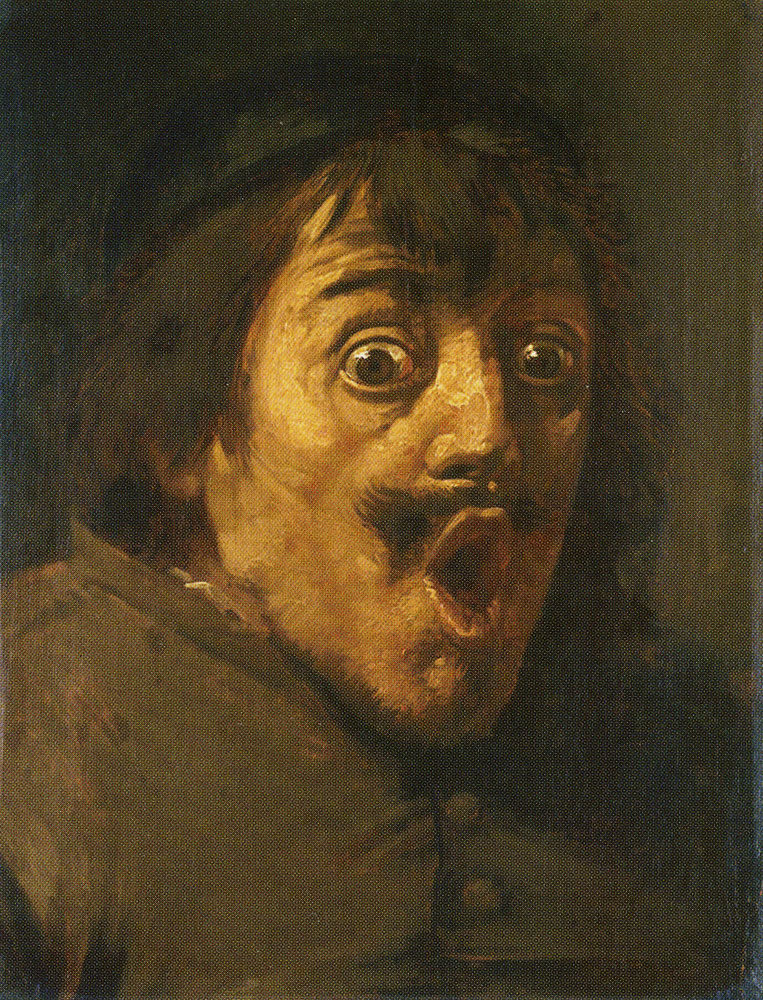
Joos van Craesbeeck, A Man Surprised, c. 1635

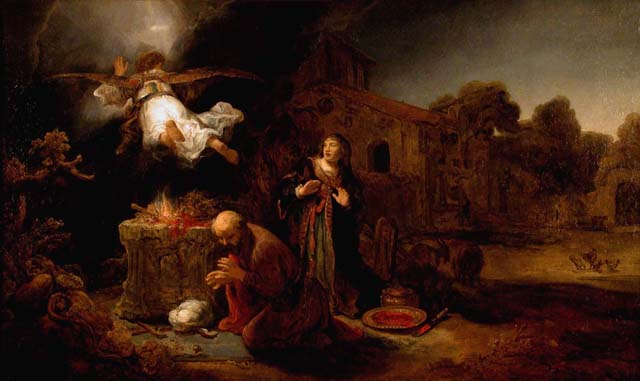
Govert Flinck, The Sacrifice of Manoah, 1640

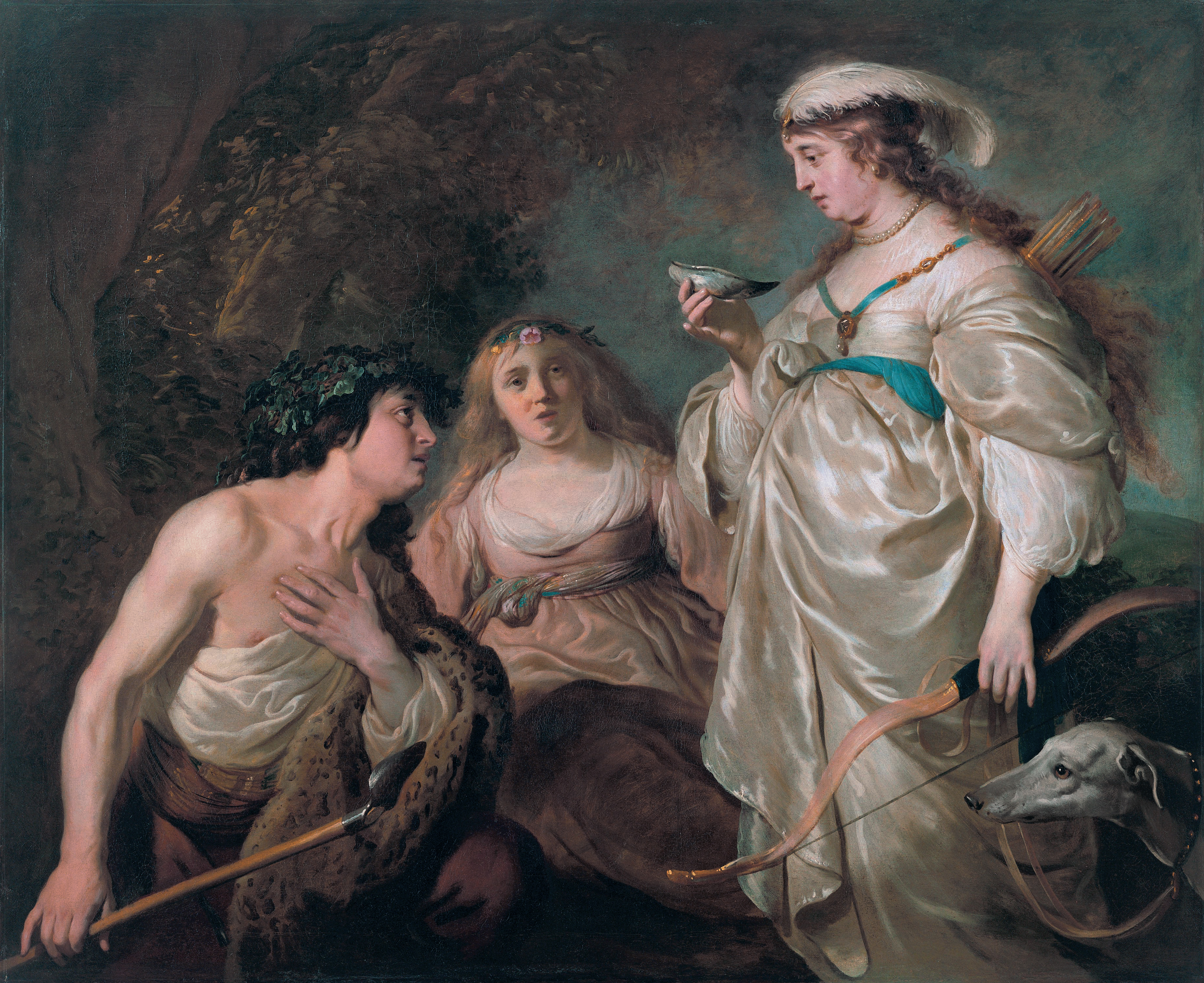
Jacob Adriaensz Backer, Granida and Daifilo, c. 1640

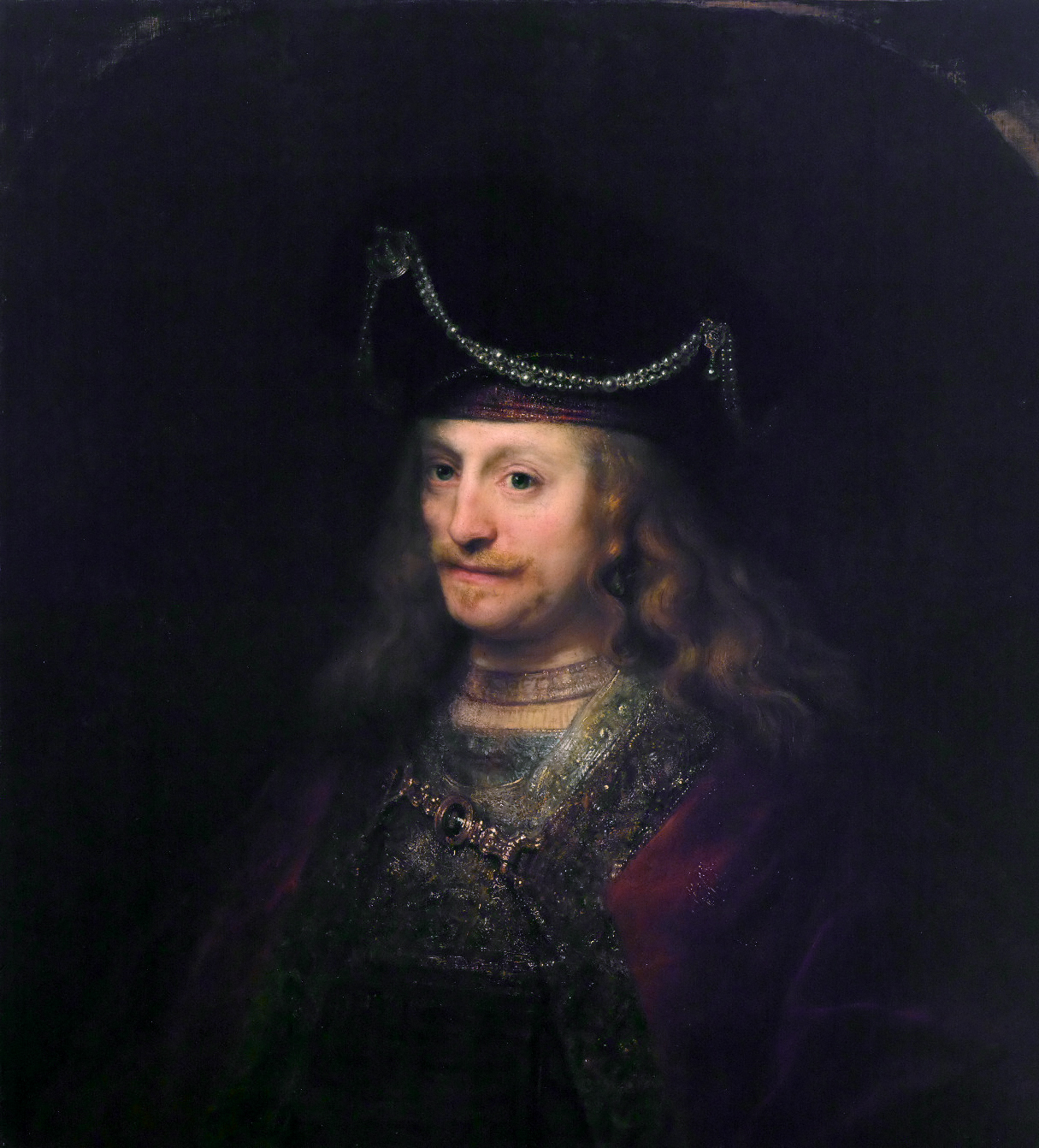
Ferdinand Bol, A Man in a Fancy Robe and a Tall Cap Strung with Pearls, c. 1643

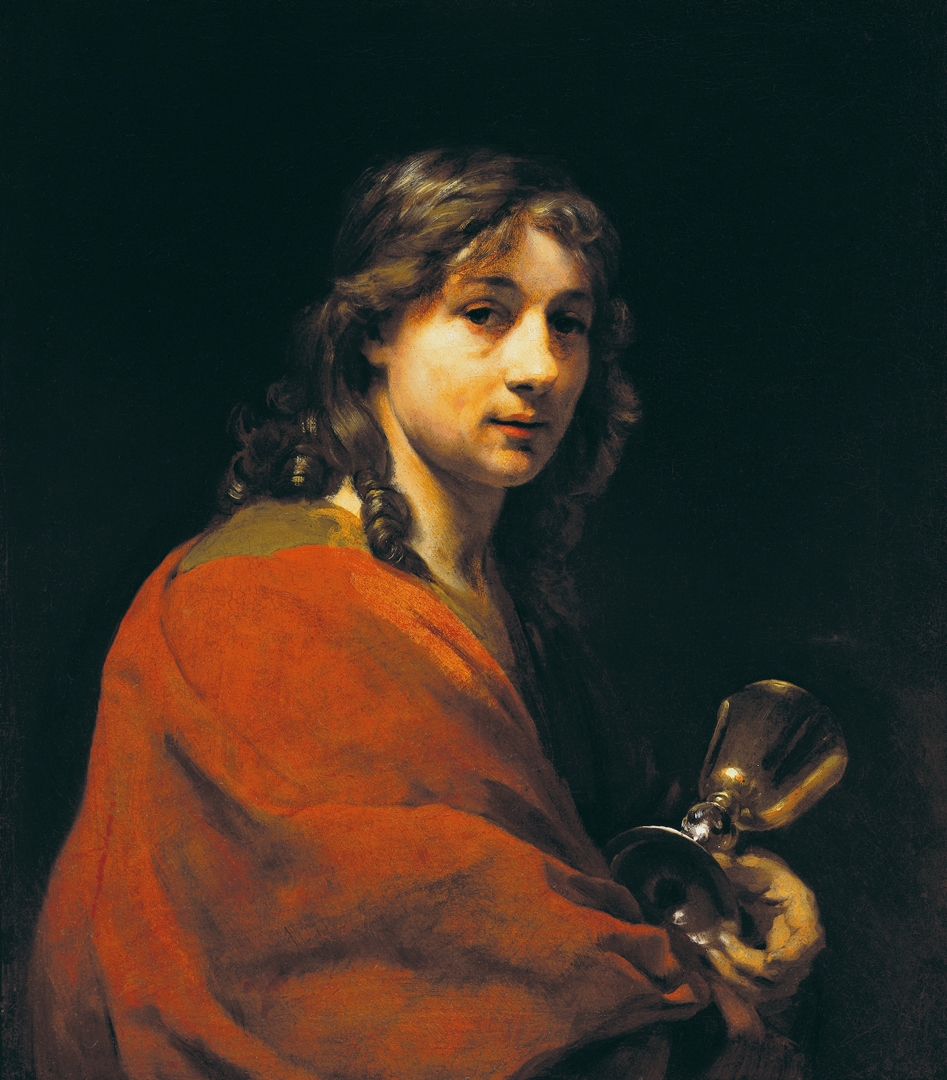
Willem Drost, Self-portrait as St. John the Evangelist, c. 1655

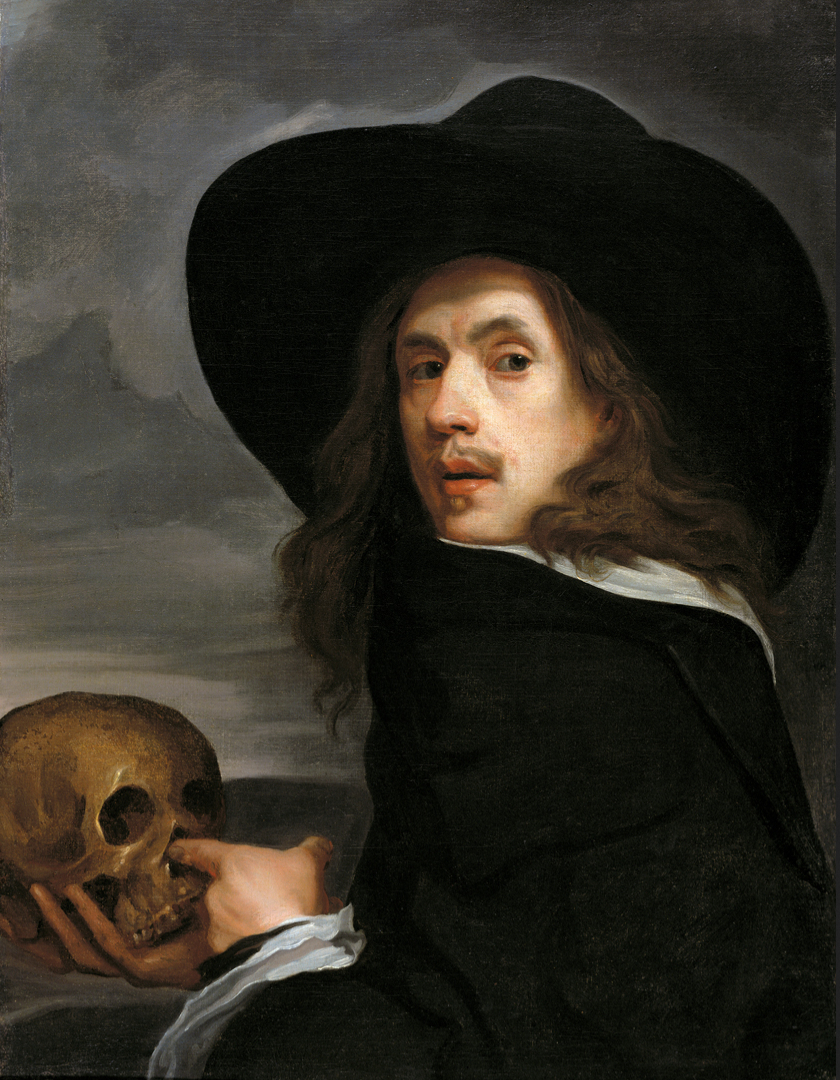
Michiel Sweerts, Self portrait with a skull, c. 1660

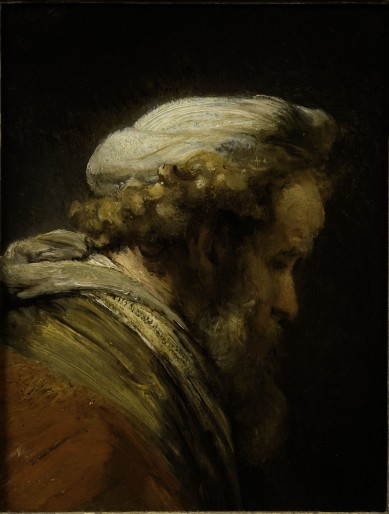
Rembrandt, Head of a Man in a Turban, c. 1661

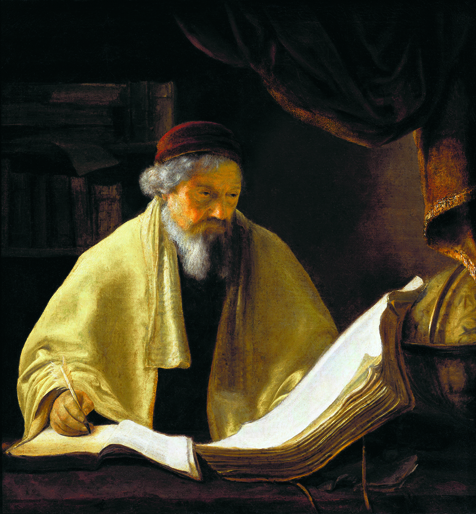
Godfrey Kneller, A Scholar in His Study, c. 1668

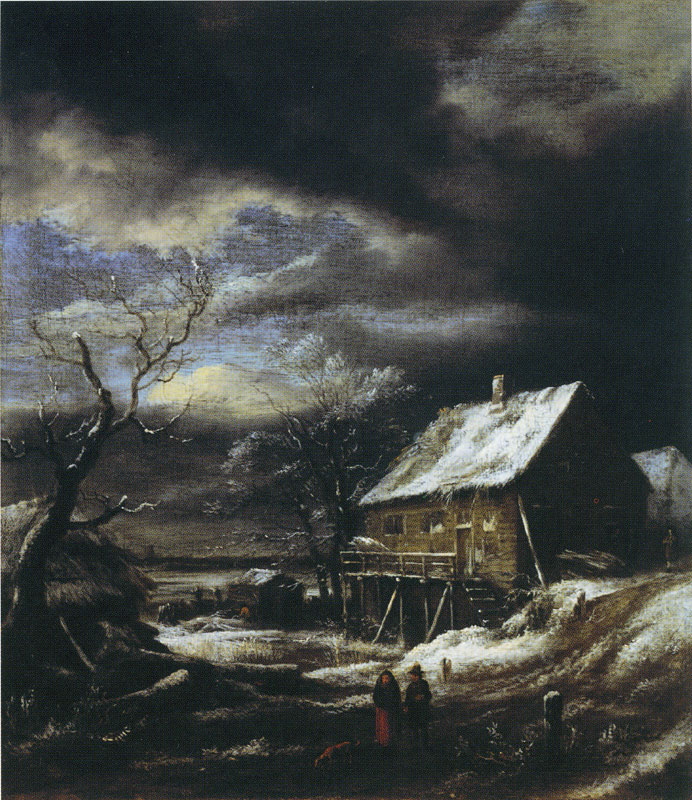
Jacob van Ruisdael, Winter Landscape with a Wooden House, c. 1667–1673

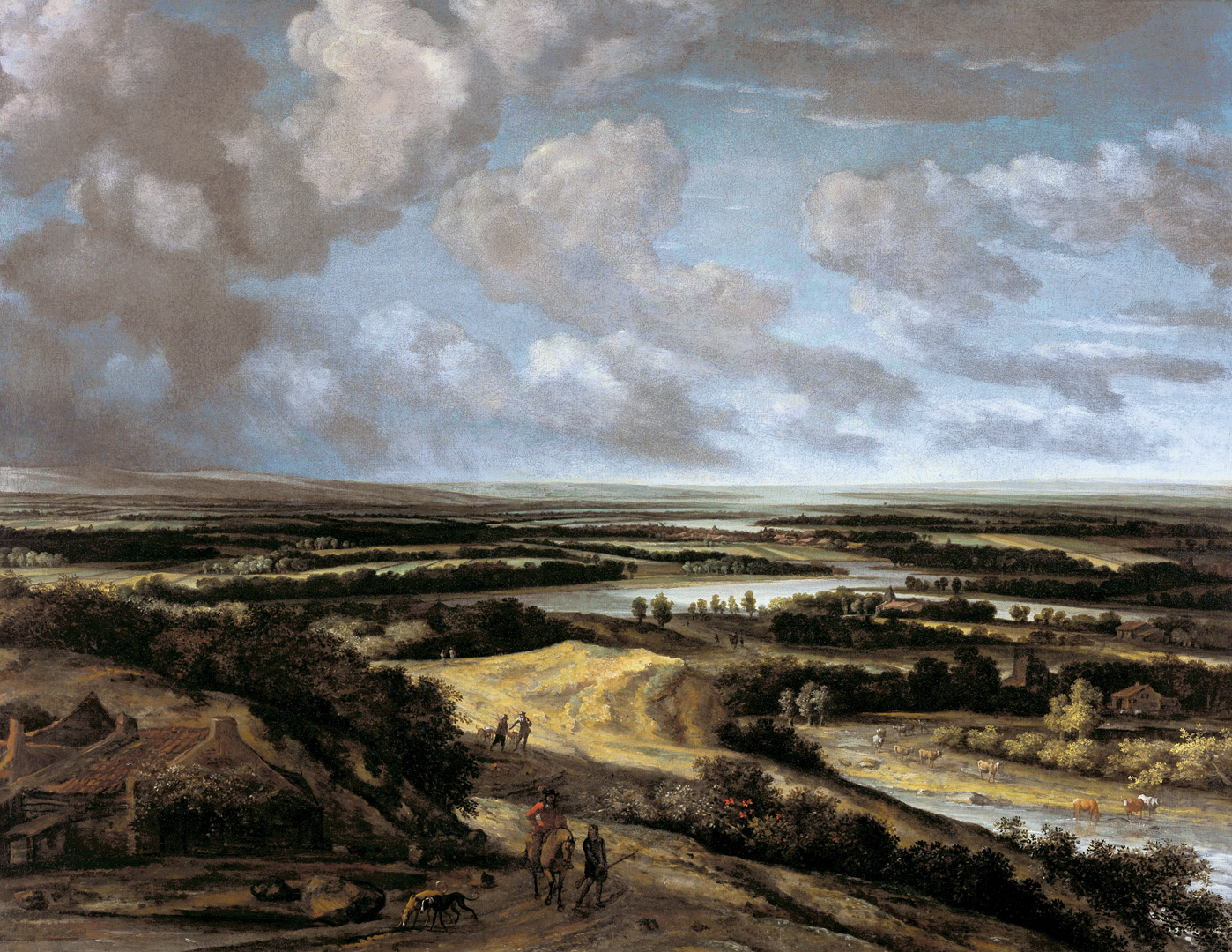
Philips Koninck, Panoramic River Landscape with Hunters, c. 1664

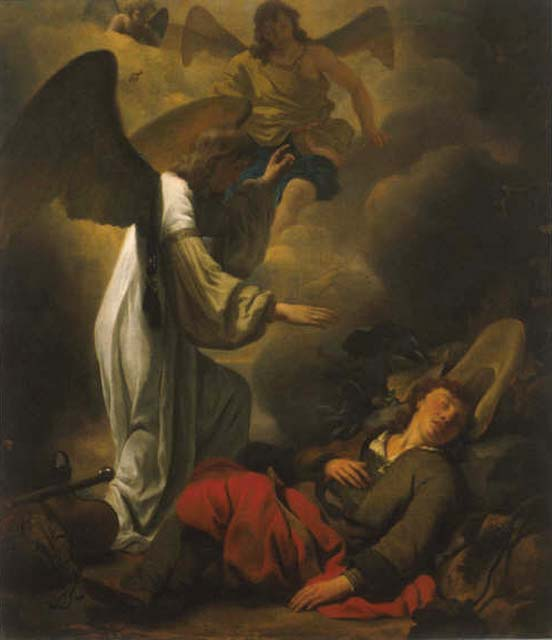
Gerbrand van den Eeckhout, Jacob’s Dream, 1672

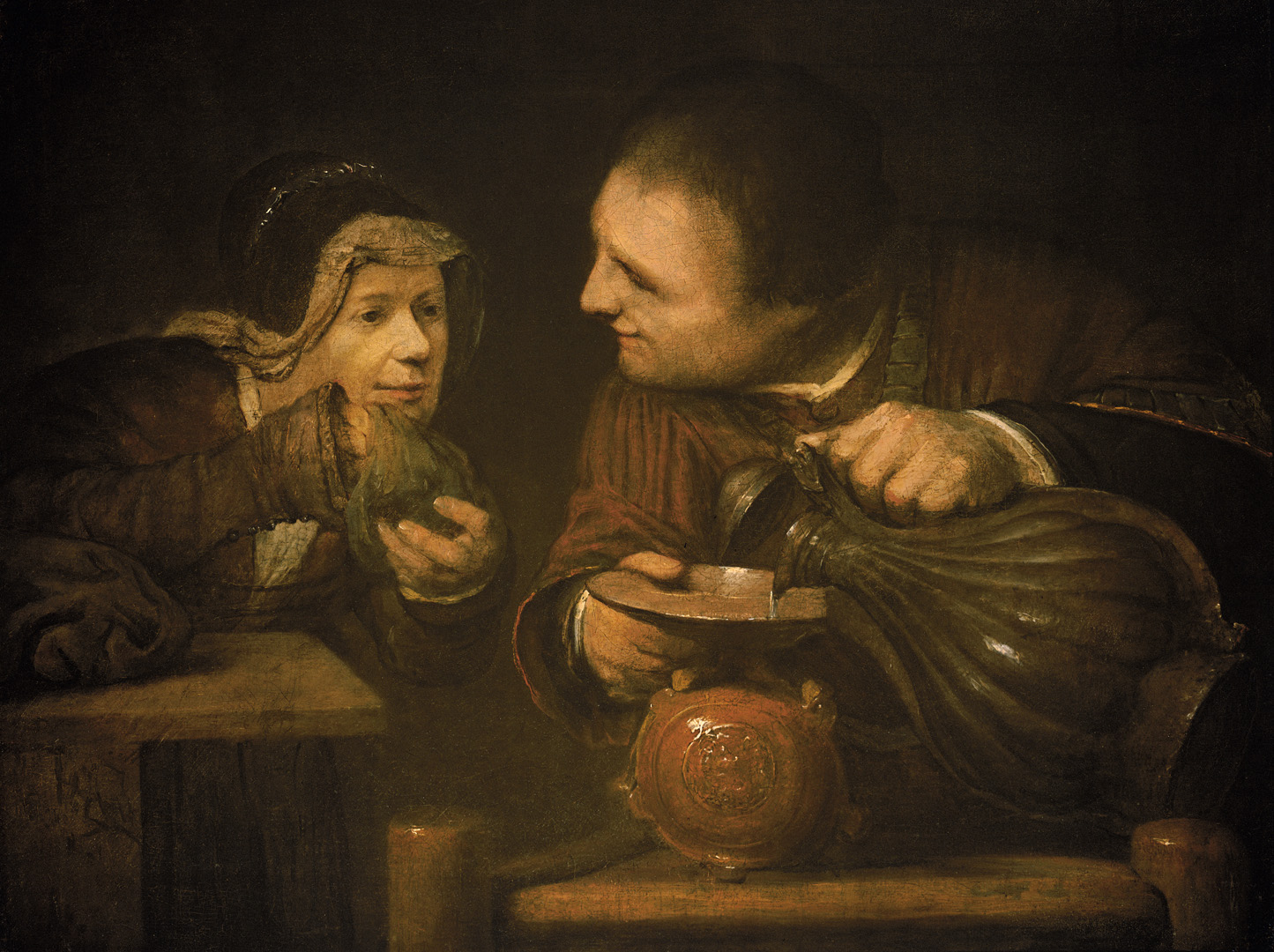
Aert de Gelder, Elisha and the Widow of the Prophet Pouring the Flasks of Oil, c. 1690s

The European collection also includes works by Dosso Dossi, Luca Giordano, Sebastien Bourdon, Peter Lely, Joseph Wright of Derby, Raphael, Parmigianino, Guido Reni, Gustav Klimt, and Pablo Picasso.

=== African art ===
Numbering over 500 objects, the Justin and Elisabeth Lang Collection of African Art ranks among Canada's most comprehensive and significant African Art collections. Comprising primarily works by West and Central African peoples.

== Selected publications ==
The Art Centre has issued many publications over the years. A selection follows:

Title	Author(s)	
Brendan Fernandes: Lost Bodies	Jan Allen, Delinda Collier, Kevin D. Dumouchelle, Amanda Gilvin, Amanda Jane Graham, Erica P. Jones, & Nat Trotman	ISBN 978-1-55339-493-8
I'm Not Myself at All: Deirdre Logue & Allyson Mitchell	Sarah E. K. Smith & Heather Love	ISBN 978-1-55339-408-2
The Artist Herself: Self-Portraits by Canadian Historical Women Artists	Alicia Boutilier & Tobi Bruce	ISBN 978-1-55339-407-5
Bernard Clark: Tattoo Portraits	Jan Allen	ISBN 978-1-55339-261-3
Vera Frenkel's String Games	Jan Allen & Earl Miller	ISBN 978-1-55339-259-0
Annie Pootoogook: Kinngait Compositions	Jan Allen	ISBN 978-1-55339-260-6
Lost and Found: Wright of Derby's View of Gibraltar	John Bonehill, Janet M. Brooke, Barbara Klempan, David de Witt	ISBN 978-1-55339-258-3
Don Maynard: Franken Forest	Jan Allen & Linda Jansma	ISBN 978-1-55339-256-9
William Brymner: Artist, Teacher, Colleague	Alicia Boutilier & Paul Maréchal	ISBN 9781553392514
Sorting Daemons: Art, Surveillance Regimes and Social Control	Jan Allen, Kirsty Robertson & Sarah E.K. Smith	ISBN 978-1-55339-253-8
Karin Davie: Underworlds	Jan Allen	ISBN 978-1-55339-095-4
The Bader Collection: Dutch and Flemish Paintings	David de Witt	ISBN 978-1-55339-094-7
Beyond the Silhouette: Fashion and the Women of Historic Kingston	M. Elaine MacKay	ISBN 978-1-55339-093-0
Etherington House: Building a Legacy	Patricia Sullivan	ISBN 978-1-55339-091-6
Lyla Rye: Hopscotch	Kenneth Hayes	ISBN 978-1-55339-092-3
Telling Stories, Secret Lives	Jan Allen, Steven Matijcio et al.	ISBN 978-1-55339-088-6
Neutrinos They Are Very Small	Jan Allen, Corinna Ghaznavi & Allison Morehead	ISBN 978-1-55339-089-3
"An Artist After All": Daniel Fowler in Canada	Dorothy M. Farr	ISBN 1-55339-090-3
Sarindar Dhaliwal: Record Keeping	Sunil Gupta, Richard Fung, Janice Cheddie et al.	ISBN 1-899127-05-4
Erik Edson: Fable	Jan Allen & Catherine Osborne	ISBN 1-55339-086-5
Ah, Wilderness! Resort Architecture in the Thousand Islands	Pierre de la Ruffinière du Prey & Dorothy Farr	ISBN 0-88911-543-5
Machine Life	Jan Allen, Ihor Holubizky & Caroline Seck Langill	ISBN 0-88911-918-X
Gary Kibbins: Grammar Horses	Jan Allen & Gary Kibbins	ISBN 0-88911-916-3
Connected: Contemporary Art in Kingston	Jan Allen (ed)	ISBN 0-88911-912-0
Museopathy	Jan Allen, Jim Drobnick & Jennifer Fisher	ISBN 0-88911-908-2
Better Worlds: Activist and Utopian Projects by Artists	Jan Allen & Laura Marks	ISBN 0-88911-912-0
Who Means What: Brent Roe, Paintings 1992-2001	John Armstrong	ISBN 0-88911-906-6
Laurel Woodcock: Take Me, I'm Yours	Jan Allen & Paul Kelley	ISBN 0-88911-827-2
Gretchen Sankey: Some of the Parts	Jan Allen	ISBN 0-88911-754-3
Jayce Salloum	Jim Drobnick & Jennifer Fisher	ISBN 0-88911-752-7
Crime and Punishment	Jennifer Rudder	ISBN 0-88911-750-0
Flaming Creatures: New Tendencies in Canadian Video.	Gary Kibbins	ISBN 0-88911-748-9
Tapes that Think: Video Works by Steve Reinke, Tran T. Kim-Trang, Rodney Werden	Gary Kibbins	ISBN 0-88911-702-0
Edifice	Jan Allen	ISBN 0-88911-748-9
Germaine Koh: Persona	Jan Allen	ISBN 0-88911-744-6
Of Mudlarkers and Measurers	S. Dhaliwal	ISBN 0-88911-742-X
Rise and Fall: John Dickson, Laurie Walker.	Jan Allen et al.	ISBN 0-88911-706-3
Sophie Bellissent: In the Flesh	Jan Allen	ISBN 0-88911-740-3
RX: Taking Our Medicine	Jan Allen & Kim Sawchuck	ISBN 0-88911-698-9
Pictorial Incidents The Photography of William Gordon Shields	Michael Bell	ISBN 0-88911-504-4
A. A. Chesterfield Ungava Portraits 1902-04	William C. James	ISBN 0-88911-373-4
Heritage Quilt Collection	Ruth McKendry & Dorothy Farr	ISBN 0-88911-539-7
