= Sarah Cook =

Sarah Cook is the name of:

- Sarah Cook (curator), Canadian curator and art historian
- Sarah Cook (rower), Australian rower
- Sarah Cook (squash player), squash player from New Zealand
