= Sarah Cook (curator) =

Canadian curator (born 1974)

- Born: 28 December 1974
- Education: University of Sunderland
- Known for: scholar, historian and curator

Sarah Cook (born 28 December 1974) is a Canadian scholar based in Scotland. She is known as a historian and curator in the field of new media art. Cook was a Research Fellow at the University of Sunderland, where she worked with the research institute CRUMB – Curatorial Resource for Upstart Media Bliss, that she co-founded with Beryl Graham in 2000, and taught on the MA Curating course. In 2013, she was appointed as a Reader and Dundee Research Fellow at Duncan of Jordanstone College of Art, University of Dundee. As part of her role as Dundee Fellow, she founded and curated LifeSpace Science Art Research Gallery in the School of Life Sciences, University of Dundee (2014–2018). She is a trustee of folly in Lancaster.

In 2018, she joined the Department of Information Studies at University of Glasgow as Professor in Museum Studies. For many years, she has curated exhibitions of new media art and was instrumental in establishing new media as an academic subject and an accepted art form.

== Biography ==
Cook received her Masters from the Center for Curatorial Studies and Art in Contemporary Culture at Bard College and her PhD from the University of Sunderland. She writes on new media arts and lectures on art and technology. Cook was an Eyebeam Fellow in 2008. In collaboration with Beryl Graham, she authored the seminal Rethinking Curating – Art after New Media (2010), and also co-edited A Brief History of Curating New Media Art – Conversations with Curators (2010) and A Brief History of Working with New Media Art – Conversations with Artists (2010). She edited the book Information (Documents of Contemporary Art, Whitechapel and MIT Press, 2016) and was curator and editor of 24/7: A Wake-up Call For Our Non-stop World (Somerset House, 2019).

In 2011, she co-chaired Re:wire, the Fourth International Conference on the histories of media, science and technology in art with FACT in Liverpool. She is Co-Curator at NEoN Festival, Dundee. She chairs the annual symposium at NEoN Festival and in 2019 co-chaired Re@ct: Social Change, Art and Technology in Dundee. She was a founding member of the advisory board of the Journal of Curatorial Studies.

== Publications ==
- Sarah Cook & Beryl Graham, Rethinking Curating: Art After New Media, Cambridge, Mass.: MIT Press, 2010. ISBN 978-0-262-01388-8.
- Sarah Cook, Verina Gfader, Beryl Graham & Axel Lapp, A Brief History of Curating New Media Art - Conversations with Curators, Berlin: The Green Box, 2010. ISBN 978-3-941644-20-5.
- Sarah Cook, Verina Gfader, Beryl Graham & Axel Lapp, A Brief History of Working with New Media Art - Conversations with Artists, Berlin: The Green Box, 2010. ISBN 978-3-941644-21-2.

== Exhibitions ==
- Subjective Projections: Adam Shecter (invited artist), Bielefelder Kunstverein, Bielefelder, Germany, 2009
- Beam Me Up, (online commissions about outer space with work from Joe Winter, Jamie O'Shea and Alec Finlay), Xcult.org, launched in 2009
- SCANZ 2009: Raranga Tangata, co-curated with Mercedes Vincente, Govett-Brewster Art Gallery, New Plymouth, New Zealand, 2009
- Untethered: A Sculpture Garden of Readymades, with work by Max Dean, Thomson&Craighead, Michel de Broin, Joe Winter, JooYoun Paek, Paul DeMarinis, Germaine Koh, Sascha Pohflepp and others, Eyebeam Art and Technology Center, New York. 2008
- Vue des Alpes (Studer/vdBerg), Add-art.org, 2008
- Broadcast Yourself: Artists interventions into television and strategies for self-broadcasting from the 1970s to Today, with work by Shaina Anand, Active Ingredient, Miranda July, Doug Hall and Chip Lord, Bill Viola, Chris Burden, VGTV, Nina Pope and Karen Guthrie and others, co-curated with Kathy Rae Huffman for AV Festival 08: Broadcast. Hatton Gallery, University of Newcastle, 2008; Cornerhouse, Manchester, 2008
- My Own Private Reality: Growing up online in the 90s and 00s, co-curated with Sabine Himmelsbach, Edith Russ Haus, Oldenburg, Germany, 2007
- The Art Formerly Known As New Media (Banff New Media Institute 10th Anniversary exhibition), co-curated with Steve Dietz, Walter Phillips Gallery, Banff, 2005.
- Relay: Germaine Koh, BALTIC Centre for Contemporary Art, 2005.
- Package Holiday: Monica Studer / Christoph van den Berg, BALTIC Centre for Contemporary Art, 2005.
- Database Imaginary, co-curated with Anthony Kiendl and Steve Dietz, Walter Phillips Gallery, Banff, 2004/05 and touring (Dunlop Art Gallery, Regina; Blackwood Gallery, University of Toronto; Liane and Danny Taran Gallery, Saidye Bronfman Centre, Montreal).
- Loop: Film Installations: Dara Friedman, Vibeke Tandberg, Marijke van Warmerdam, Reg Vardy Gallery, University of Sunderland, 2003.
- Monument by Margaret Crane | Jon Winet, commissioned by Locus+, Newcastle upon Tyne, funded by the Arts Council of England New Media Projects Fund, launched 2002.
- Undelete, New work by Helena Swatton. Waygood Gallery and Studios. Newcastle upon Tyne, 2001.
- Vuk Cosic www.thisistherealmatrix.com for BALTIC Centre for Contemporary Art, Gateshead, online commission as part of A History of the Future, organised by Northern Architecture, 2001.
- Use nor Ornament, co-curated with Helen Smith and Ele Carpenter, Northern Gallery for Contemporary Art, Sunderland, 2000.
- Scales of Life, LifeSpace Science Art Research Gallery, Dundee, October 1 2014/15
- Alt-w (invited curatorial project with New Media Scotland), SSA Annual Exhibition, Royal Scottish Academy, Edinburgh, 2014
- Material Concerns, LifeSpace Science Art Research Gallery, Dundee, 2015
- Hearts & Minds (with Aidan Moesby, Jim Pattison, and others), LifeSpace Science Art Research Gallery, Dundee, with the Hannah Maclure Centre, Abertay University, 2015
- A Working Model of the World (touring exhibition from UNSW Galleries Sydney the Sheila C. Johnson Design Centre and The Curators' Department), at LifeSpace, 2018
