= Kathleen Ritter =

Artist, curator, and writer

Kathleen Ritter is an artist, curator, and writer based in Vancouver and Paris who focuses on contemporary art. In her works she is focused on exploring themes of "visibility, especially in relation to systems of power, language and technology,".

== Career ==
Ritter graduated from the Emily Carr University of Art + Design with a BFA in 2000 and obtained an MFA from the University of Western Ontario in 2005. In 2013, Ritter was an artist in residence at the Cité Internationale Universitaire de Paris in Paris. She was a visiting artist in residency at Open Studio, Toronto, in the spring of 2017. Ritter also works as a part of the advisory council for Prefix ICA At the Vancouver Art Gallery, Ritter curated shows including How Soon Is Now (2009) and Beat Nation (2012). Ritter has been featured in exhibitions including Transference (2018), Camoufleurs (2018), Some Spontaneous Particulars (2017 - 2018), In Broad Daylight (2017), and In Search of Expo 67 (2017).

== Publications ==
- How to Recognize a Furtive Practice — A User’s Guide. Les editions esse. (2005)
- Welcome to the Wild East. Fillip. (2007)
- Mistuning the Narratives of Performance. (in collaboration with Jessica Wyman). (2008)
- An Image, Misremembered. Prefix Photo. (2011)
- Pierre Huyghe, The Waking Dream. Canadian Art. (December 13, 2013)
- Beat Nation: Art, Hip hop and Aboriginal Culture. (co-authored with Tania Willard). (2012)
- Ritter also has numerous articles published on the esse arts + opinions webpage.
