= Susanne Kriemann =

German artist and university professor (born 1972)

Susanne Kriemann (born 1972 in Erlangen) is a German artist, photographer and professor at Karlsruhe University of Arts and Design.

== Life and career ==
Susanne Kriemann graduated from the State Academy of Fine Arts in Stuttgart in 1997, where she studied in the class of Joseph Kosuth and Joan Jonas. She enrolled in the 'programme de recherché' at the École nationale supérieure des Beaux-Arts in Paris in 2000.

Susanne Kriemann pursues a research-oriented approach and investigates the medium of photography in the context of social history and archival practice: dealing with archival and found documents, in particular those that have not been used or have fallen into oblivion, is a central aspect to her work. The found photo material then frequently serves as a starting point for her own images. Formal or thematic analogies generate multifaceted layers of association, which address the circumstances in which the historical images were produced, their preservation, as well as their link to the present day—and always also examine her own medium of photography.

With an extended notion of the photographic document, she reflects on the world as an analogue 'recording system' for human-caused processes. This has led to preoccupations with radioactivity and mining, archaeology, and the notion of slow violence. A focus on ecology is prevalent in Kriemann's subjects. To perceive polluted areas as vast photosensitive arrays is key to her understanding of landscape. An exceptional feature is the extraction of pigments from the investigated matter and the use of those pigments to produce her pictures.

Kriemann's work was exhibited internationally at, among others, Wattis Institute for Contemporary Art, San Francisco; Kunsthalle Wien, Vienna; The Stedelijk Museum, Amsterdam and Kunsthalle Winterthur, Zurich. Recently, solo exhibitions of her work were on view at the Museum für Kunst und Gewerbe, Hamburg and Salonul de projecte, Bucarest. Kriemann has participated, among others, in the 3rd Chennai Photo Biennale, the 4th Kyiv Biennial, the 11th Shanghai Biennial, the 10th Gothenburg Biennial and the 5th Berlin Biennial. Furthermore, she participated in various artist residency programs including the 2019 NTU Centre for Contemporary Art, Singapore and The Goethe Institute, Colombo. Publications play a major role in her practice; since 1998 she has made seventeen artist books.

In 2017, Susanne Kriemann joined the faculty of the Karlsruhe University of Arts and Design as a professor of fine-art photography. Together with Aleksander Komarov, she is one of the cofounders of the artist-run initiative AIR Berlin Alexanderplatz. Kriemann lives and works in Berlin and Karlsruhe.

== Work and work cycles (selection) ==
Forest, Frst, t like teamwork (2020–21) proposes a critical approach to the phenomenon of Europe-wide deforestation focusing particularly on Romania's primary forests, with the aim to raise awareness on the interrelation of fast furniture consumption and deforestation.

Dachziegel, Backstein, Wasserrohr (gewidmet der Roten Waldameise, Strunkameise, Kerbameise) (2020–21) connects to the culture of remembrance and the reappraisal of National Socialism from the climate-change driven perspective of the twenty-first century. Adopting the collaborative perspectives of ant, artist and site, the work contributes to a diversified understanding of entangled histories and futures on the example of the Ravensbrück Memorial in Brandenburg, Germany.

Mngrv (polymersday & nylonsnoon) (since 2020) explores how in times of climate change and environmental pollution the borders between nature and culture, plant and plastic, increasingly blur: Southeast Asian mangrove habitats – their rhizomatic roots exposed to the rhythm of the tides, entangled with fishnets and plastic waste –, are depicted and overprinted with pigment extracted from raw oil remnants collected on site. In the entanglement of ocean, plant and plastic, Kriemann identifies a new species – Mngrv – to be added to the botanical sciences.

Pechblende (since 2016) is a work cycle concerned with both the literal and the political invisibility of radioactivity. Bringing together an assemblage of archival materials, photo documents, literature and found objects, Pechblende investigates concepts of scale, proximity and distance in relation to radioactivity and the body. Pechblende (Prologue) employs analog photographic methods, including autoradiography, combining them with archival material. Aiming to visualize the a-visibility and yet acute presence of radioactivity. Pechblende (Chapter 1) incorporates a range of museum objects, including tools, chains, and clothing, that together refer to the toxic history of uranium mining and its impact on the body of the miner.

Pechblende (Volume) is a continuation of Kriemann's investigations based on field research in the former uranium mining areas Gessenwiese and Kanigsberg (part of the former SDAG Wismut mining company). Plants harvested on site become the basis for photographic processes and pigment production. Falsche Kamille, Wilde Möhre, Bitterkraut [False Chamomile, Wild Carrot, Ox Tongue] (2016–17) is a series of photograms (Cycle 1) and heliogravures (Cycle 2) based on these three weeds most capable of extracting and storing their environmental pollutants. Canopy, Canopy (2018) is composed of several interrelated elements – dyed and woven pieces of raw silks, solar light panels, archival boxes with harvested objects – opening up a conceptual system of photographic processes related to radioactivity.

Duskdust (2016) is an artist book and a series of monographs, which takes as its starting point the former industrial site of limestone mining at Furilden peninsula on the northeastern coast of Gotland, Sweden. It is informed by the artist's ongoing preoccupation with photography, labor, and archeology.

Ruda (2015) was developed for the 2015 Moscow Biennial. The mohair woven tapestry depicts multiple fragmented images from the early 20th century as a projection onto the mountainous landscape of Magnitogorsk, a city marked by the iron and steel industry, its radical take on life and work and formerly irrepressible enthusiasm for progress.

RAY (2013–14) examines a radioactive rock discovered in the Barringer Hill Mine in Llano, Texas, in the late 1800s, focussing on the material and mystical limit of knowing and seeing and on how a narrative loops through archaeological layers without ever finding its source.

Het Licht (2011–12) deals with the disappearance of a specific site: the Art Deco building 'Het Licht' (The Light), a former newspaper printing workshop in Ghent.

277569 (2011–12) consists of a slideshow of aerial photographs taken by Kriemann in 2012 while flying over the south of Berlin in a helicopter. The title reflects the number of airlift flights undertaken during the Berlin Blockade in 1948/49.

A silent crazy jungle under glass (2010–14) combines historical forms of abstraction with aspects of the archive and representational imagery. Crumbling flowers (Yellow), haggard rock faces (Gestein), still life and archival material (Prologue) blur the boundaries between resolution and repetition.

Ashes and broken brickwork of a logical theory (2009) relates material from Agatha Christie's photographic archives to photographs by Kriemann of the Syrian desert and archaeological sites in Mesopotamia. The work pursues the trajectory of archaeology, the artefact, the image of the individual at work, and the idea of the desert as a symbol of the modern desire to create an empty slate, a tabula rasa.

One Time One Million (2006–2009) departs from the technical inventions of Swedish photographer Victor Hasselblad and his love of birdwatching, setting in motion the entangled histories of (aerial) photography, ornithology and migration.

== Publications ==
=== Artist books (selection) ===
- Susanne Kriemann, Ge(ssenwiese) K(angisberg) Library for radioactive afterlife, Spector Books, Leipzig 2020, ISBN 978-3-95905-336-5.
- Susanne Kriemann, P(ech) B(lende) Library for radioactive afterlife, Spector Books, Leipzig 2016, ISBN 978-3-95905-099-9.
- Susanne Kriemann, Duskdust, Sternberg Press, Berlin / New York 2016, ISBN 978-3-95679-236-6.
- Susanne Kriemann, RAY, Roma publications, Amsterdam 2014, ISBN 978-94-91843-19-8.
- Susanne Kriemann, ONE DAY, Witte de With Publishers, Rotterdam 2010, ISBN 978-90-73362-95-6.
- Susanne Kriemann, Ashes and Broken Brickwork of a Logical Theory, Roma Publications, Amsterdam 2010, ISBN 978-90-77459-44-7.
- Susanne Kriemann, One Time One Million, Roma Publications, Amsterdam 2009, ISBN 978-90-77459-35-5.
- Susanne Kriemann, 12650, A Prior / 5th Berlin Bienniale, Bruxelles / Berlin 2008.
- Susanne Kriemann, ONE BOOK (unique artist book), Museum of Book Art Lodz 2009/15.
- Susanne Kriemann, Not Quite Replica, Rotterdam 2006, ISBN 90-810795-1-4.

=== Other publications / catalogues ===
- Susanne Kriemann, Judith Milz, Friederike Schäfer, Klaus Nippert, Elke Leinenweber (Eds.), 10% – Concerning the Image Archive of a Nuclear Research Center, Spector Books, Leipzig 2021, ISBN 978-3-95905-476-8.
- Aleksander Komarov & Susanne Kriemann (Eds.), Funken zu Flammen: 10 + 1 years ABA artists research, Spector Books, Leipzig 2021, ISBN 978-3-95905-547-5.
- Eva Wilson & Susanne Kriemann, Exclusion Zones, Supplement 2, Fillip, Vancouver 2017, ISBN 978-1-927354-29-2.
- Berlinische Galerie, Hilke Wagner, Axel Wieder (Eds), Susanne Kriemann, Sternberg Press, Berlin 2013, ISBN 978-3-943365-69-6.
- Hans Dickel, Lisa Puyplat (Eds), Reading Susanne Kriemann, Sternberg Press, Berlin, 2011, ISBN 978-1-934105-49-8.
- Kunstverein Braunschweig, Thomas Köhler (et al.), Susanne Kriemann, Kerber Verlag, Bielefeld, 2010, ISBN 978-3-86678-466-6.

=== Selected articles ===
- Siobhan Angus; Atomic Ecology. October 2022; (179): 110–131.
- Kyveli Mavrokordopoulou; Of Time and Contaminated Flowers: On the Work of Susanne Kriemann and Anaïs Tondeur. Esse 2021(99); (32–39).
- Eva Wilson, Exclusion Zones, Fillip, Vancouver 2017.
- Wendy Tronrud; Susanne Kriemann: Möglichkeiten, Steine zu betrachten. Camera Austria International 2013; (124): 9–20. (German)
- Jennifer Allen; Picture Imperfect. Searching in the archives, Susanne Kriemann finds a new life for photography. Frieze 2011; (1)

== Exhibitions ==
=== Solo exhibitions (selection) ===
- 2021: Forest, Frst, t like teamwork, Salonul de projecte, Bucharest, RO.
- 2020/21: Fotografien Neu Ordnen: Gestrüpp, MK&G, Hamburg, DE.
- 2020: Mngrv, Block C, Groningen, NL.
- 2018: Canopy Canopy, CCA Wattis Institute for Contemporary Art, San Francisco, USA.
- 2017: Dyeing until the water runs clean, Kunstforum Baloise, Basel, CH; Gessenwiese, Kanigsberg, Wilfried Lentz, Rotterdam, NL.
- 2016: Pechblende (Chapter 1), Schering Foundation, Berlin, DE; Pechblende (Prologue), Prefix ICA, Toronto, CA; Duskdust, RaebervonStenglin, Zürich, CH.
- 2013: Modelling (Construction School), Arnolfini, Bristol, UK; Het Licht, RaebervonStenglin, Zürich, CH; RAY, 21er Haus / 21er Raum, Vienna, AT.
- 2012: Everything was soulful and all souls were one, Wilfried Lentz, Rotterdam, NL; Het Licht, KASK, De Zwarte Zaal Gent, BE; Cold Time, Kunstverein Braunschweig, Brunswick, DE.
- 2011: A Silent Crazy Jungle Under Glass, Kunsthalle Winterthur, Winterthur, CH.
- 2010: Ashes and broken brickwork of a logical theory, RaebervonStenglin, Zürich, CH; Berlinische Galerie, Berlin, DE; KIOSK, Gent, BE.
- 2009: One Time One Million (Migratory Birds Romantic Capitalism), Stedelijk Museum Bureau, Amsterdam, NL.
- 2007: The originality of the avant-garde and other modernist myths, Projectstudio, Berlin, DE.
- 2004: TCM – The Quiet American, Städtische Galerie Erlangen, Erlangen, DE.

=== Group exhibitions (2018–2022, selection) ===
- 2022: Mining Photography, MK&G, Hamburg, DE; Takeover, Gropius Bau, Berlin, DE
- 2021: Beuys Open Source, Belmacz Gallery, London, UK; Maps of Disquiet, 3rd Chennai Photo Biennale, IN; Allied, Kyiv Biennial, UA; Mind Bombs, Kunsthalle Mannheim, DE; Ocean, Bergen Konsthal, NO; Inventing Nature, Pflanzen in der Kunst, Staatliche Kunsthalle Karlsruhe, DE; The Ghost Ship and the Sea Change, 11th Gothenburg International Biennale for Contemporary Art, SE; Dinge, die wir voneinander ahnen, Badischer Kunstverein, Karlsruhe, DE
- 2020: Fragile Times / Zerbrechliche Zeiten, Galerie im Körnerpark, Berlin, DE; Plural Fertilities, Kunstfort Vijfhuizen, NL; Krakow Photomonth, Krakow, PL; Rote Waldameise (ehemalige Unterführerhäuser Ravensbrück), Stiftung Brandenburgische Gedenkstätten, DE; The Prenumbral Age, Museum of Modern Art Warsaw, PL; (Un)endliche Ressourcen, Städtische Galerie Karlsruhe, DE.
- 2019: Vom Leben in Industrielandschaften, Leopold-Hösch Museum, Düren, DE; Flight Interrupted: Eco-leaks from the Invasion Desk, Karachi Biennale, PK; Spiral Time, Röda Sten Konsthall, 10th Gothenburg International Biennale for Contemporary Art, SE; Licht, Luft, Scheiße, nGbK and Botanical Garden, Berlin, DE; Remembering Landscape, De Maarkten, Brüssel, BE;
- 2018: Pochen, Multimedia Biennale, Chemnitz, DE; Remembering Landscape, MNAC, Bucharest, RO; Zerrissene Gesellschaft. Ereignisse von langer Dauer, Centre de la photographie Genève, CH; Elymus Repens – A proposal by Lucile Bouvard, Bar Babette, Berlin, DE; All our secrets, Centre for Contemporary Arts Celje, SI; Zerissene Gesellschaft, F-Stop Festival für Fotografie, Leipzig, DE; Landschaft, die sich erinnert, Museum für Gegenwartskunst Siegen, DE; This Rare Earth – Stories from Below, STUK, Artefact Festival, Leuven, BE.

== Grants and awards ==
- 2015: Research grant of the Berlin Senate 2015
- 2014: Kunstfonds Bonn
- 2012: Grant of the Berlin Senate 2012
- 2010: GASAG Kunstpreis (Art Prize) '10, Berlin, Germany
- 2009: Preis der Kunststiftung Erlangen (Prize of the Erlangen Art Foundation)

== See also ==
- List of German women artists
