= Axel Lapp =

German curator, art historian and publisher

- Occupations: curator, art historian and publisher

Axel Lapp (born 1966 in Konstanz, West Germany) is a German curator, art historian and publisher, who is based in Memmingen. He is director of MEWO Kunsthalle as well as of Strigel- and Antoniter-Museum in Memmingen. From 2005 until 2013, he was publisher of The Green Box, an art book publisher in Berlin.

== Biography ==
Axel Lapp studied museology and art history in Marburg, Essex and Manchester. He was Henry Moore Research Fellow at the University of Leeds (1998–2000) and Senior Post-Doctoral Researcher at the University of Sunderland (2009–2010). From 2002 until 2012, he worked as an art critic for Art Review and Art Monthly, and as a freelance curator for contemporary art.

For the art publisher The Green Box, which he directed from 2005 until 2013, he edited numerous books on contemporary art and curating.

Since 2012, Lapp is Director of MEWO Kunsthalle in Memmingen. His first exhibition there, in March 2013, was 'CINEMA and the cinematografic gaze', with works by Omer Fast, Clemens von Wedemeyer, Ming Wong and many others.

== Publications (selection) ==
- Jeanne van Heeswijk: Systems, The Green Box, Berlin 2006. ISBN 978-3-908175-05-6
- 150 Jahre Kunstverein Konstanz, The Green Box, Berlin 2008. ISBN 978-3-908175-51-3
- A Brief History of Curating New Media Art, The Green Box, Berlin 2010 (ed. with Sarah E. Cook, Beryl Graham, Verina Gfader). ISBN 978-3-941644-20-5
- A Brief History of Working with New Media Art, The Green Box, Berlin 2010 (ed. with Sarah E. Cook, Beryl Graham, Verina Gfader). ISBN 978-3-941644-21-2
- Cornelia Renz: Night. Tail. Pieces, The Green Box, Berlin 2011. ISBN 978-3-941644-30-4
- Curating in the Caribbean, The Green Box, Berlin 2012 (ed. with David A. Bailey MBE, Allison Thompson, Alissandra Cummins). ISBN 978-3-941644-32-8
- Marion Ermer Preis 2011, The Green Box, Berlin 2011. ISBN 978-3-941644-35-9
- Costa Vece: Revolucion – Patriotismo, The Green Box, Berlin 2012. ISBN 978-3-941644-34-2

== Exhibitions ==
- 'Alles Maskerade! Fasching, Karneval & Mummenschanz im Spiegel der Kunst'; Arbeiten von Ewan Atkinson, Sonia Boyce, Adam Chodzko, Leah Gordon, Marlon Griffith, Kahn & Selesnick, Marie Rime, Corinna Theuring und Alexandra Vogt, sowie ‚elfuhrelf’, einer Ausstellung in der Ausstellung, mit Fotografien von Theo Barth, Ute Behrend, Thekla Ehling, Dirk Gebhardt, Matthias Jung, David Klammer, Frederic Lezmi, Nadine Preiß und Wolfgang Zurborn. Memmingen, MEWO Kunsthalle, 2014
- 'KINO und der kinematografische Blick: Friedemann Hahn, Omer Fast, Romeo Grünfelder, Emanuel Mathias, Jana Müller, Georg Parthen, Martina Sauter, John Sealey, Jason Silva, John Stezaker, Clemens von Wedemeyer und Ming Wong'. Memmingen, MEWO Kunsthalle, 2013
- 'Jens Schubert: Blackmagickparty'. Memmingen, MEWO Kunsthalle, 2013
- '8 + 8 – video art': "Sonia Boyce". Guangzhou, 53 Art Museum (美术馆), 2011
- 'Marion-Ermer-Preis 2011: Loretta Fahrenholz, Emanuel Mathias, Claudia Schötz, Jens Schubert'. Dresden, Hochschule für Bildende Künste (Oktogon), 2011
- 'Cornelia Renz: Night. Tale. Pieces', Konstanz, Kunstverein, 2011
- 'Lucie Renneboog: 'mmmmm' diagram – naïf and mymaybe idiot summary of something we knew.'. Berlin, Axel Lapp Projects, 2009
- 'Roland Iselin: What we do when we think about love'. Berlin, Axel Lapp Projects, 2008
- 'Nick Crowe: Sammlung Witkowski'. Berlin, Axel Lapp Projects, 2008
- 'Martin Newth: Ausblick'. Berlin, Axel Lapp Projects, 2008
- 'Menschen und Orte' - an exhibition for the 150. anniversary of Kunstverein Konstanz. Konstanz, Kunstverein & Wessenberg-Galerie, 2008
- 'a season of film: Sonia Boyce & David Bickerstaff, Nick Crowe & Ian Rawlinson, Jeanne van Heeswijk & Marten Winters, Mona Jas & Holger Friese, Sonia Khurana and John Sealey'. Berlin, Axel Lapp Projects, 2008
- 'Sonia Boyce: Crop Over', Berlin, Axel Lapp Projects, 2008
- 'Nikola Irmer: Boys'. Berlin, Axel Lapp Projects, 2007
- 'Josephine Flynn: Mayonnaise and Salad Cream'. Berlin, Axel Lapp Projects, 2007
- 'Mona Jas: Die Plejaden #1'. Berlin, Axel Lapp Projects, 2007
- 'Shezad Dawood: The End of Civilisation'. Berlin, Axel Lapp Projects, 2007
- 'Review: Sonia Boyce, Nick Crowe, Holger Friese, Jeanne van Heeswijk, Mona Jas'. Berlin, Axel Lapp Projects, 2007
