= Cardinal Courier Media =

- Company type: Private
- Industry: Media
- Founded: 2007
- Headquarters: Pittsford, New York

Cardinal Courier Media, or CCM, is the overseeing body of several media outlets at St. John Fisher College in Pittsford, New York. CCM was founded in 2007 but has roots that date back to 2002.

== Cardinal Courier ==
Cardinal Courier
- Type: Bi-weekly newspaper
- Format: Berliner
- Owner: Cardinal Courier Media
- Editor: Mallory Schake
- Founded: 2002
- Headquarters: Pittsford, New York
- Circulation: 2,000
- Website: Cardinal Courier Online

The Cardinal Courier was the student newspaper at St. John Fisher College in Pittsford, New York. The newspaper was published bi-weekly on Wednesdays. The Courier published 12 issues per year. The newspaper was named the New York Press Association's Best College newspaper for 2008 and was twice awarded General Excellence by the NYPA (2002 and 2008). The paper has transitioned to a solely digital entity.

=== History ===
The original Courier flag (2002-2007).

On April 23, 2002, students at Fisher launched the Cardinal Courier, a new newspaper. Led by John Follaco and Kara Race, this publication replaced the previous paper, The Pioneer. The Pioneer had fallen into disarray and had an ever-shrinking staff. Editors had resigned and the paper had been too closely affiliated with Fisher's student government. After shutting The Pioneer, time was spent researching other papers and determining the direction the new paper should go.

The Courier represented a distinct opposite from the last years of The Pioneer as the younger paper has won several awards, including Columbia and New York Press Association Awards. In 2007, the Courier won the New York Press Association's Best Sports Coverage award for 2006.

Over its existence, the Courier expanded from an eight-page publication to a publication of at least 24 pages an issue. The Courier covered all aspects of the college, including news, opinion, lifestyles and sports.

During the Courier's early years, Lisa "Murph" Murphy held the position of media adviser. Murphy played a vital role in acquiring the resources needed for the Courier to become the campus media influence that it is now. At the end of the 2005–06 school year, Murphy stepped down from the position to take the position of media adviser at Buffalo's Medaille College student newspaper. In 2008, Murphy was recognized for her contributions by induction into St. John Fisher College's Jack Palvino Communication/Journalism Hall of Fame.

With the departure of Murphy, Steve Boerner was hired as the new media adviser for the Cardinal Courier. The next year posed a rough transition for the Courier. Its long-time adviser was gone, many of the final remnants from the founding Courier generation had graduated and membership saw a steep decline. The Spring Semester of 2007, with Bill Kuchman as the new editor in chief, became a period of rapid growth for the Courier. The organization moved from solely publishing a newspaper to additionally publishing a magazine, C Magazine, and maintaining a website, Cardinal Courier Online. With the September 19, 2007 edition, the Courier launched its redesign. Almost every aspect of the paper was changed — from the flag to typefaces to layout. The changes in management along with the new media offerings proved to be an effective recruiting tool.

The "Courier" ceased publication in 2015. In a statement, department chair Jeremy Sarachan said that the print product was no longer an "appropriate [platform] for our students to write and disseminate news in a manner that gives them the specific educational experiences they need."

=== Athletes of the Year ===
Beginning in 2006, the Courier began awarding a Male and Female Athlete of the Year accolade. All Fisher athletes were eligible and the award was voted upon by the Courier sports department. For 2007, the same criteria were used as the 2006 awards, except that both the Courier and Cardinal Television's Fisher Sports Desk voted on the recipients of the award. Starting in 2008, the Courier went back to the format that it used in 2006. In 2013, the 2007 format was used again, as part of the Courier's and CTV's efforts to work together.
