= Prefix Institute of Contemporary Art =

Art gallery in Toronto, Canada

Coordinates: 43°38′52″N 79°23′42″W

Prefix Institute of Contemporary Art is a public art gallery and an arts publishing house with a focus on contemporary photography, new media and digital arts. It is located in the 401 Richmond Street arts centre in Toronto, Canada.

== History ==
Prefix Photo magazine was founded by Canadian curator Scott McLeod in 1999 and has since expanded to include a programme of visual and audio art exhibitions, an international lecture series (the Urban Field Speaker Series), and a publicly accessible reference library.

Prefix ICA is a registered Canadian charitable organization supported by its sponsors, donors, and funding bodies at all levels of government. Prefix is also a member of the Ontario Association of Art Galleries, the Canadian Museums Association and Magazines Canada. It's gallery space at 401 Richmond,Toronto opened in 2003–04.

== Prefix ICA Galleries ==
Prefix Institute of Contemporary Art consists of three galleries: a main gallery, a surround gallery and an audio art gallery. Both the staff curator and guest curators program exhibitions year-round.

=== Selected exhibitions ===
- Rodney Graham: Jack of All Trades. Curated by Scott McLeod, 2016.
- Susanne Kriemann: Pechblende (Prologue). Curated by Jayne Wilkinson, 2016.
- Charles Stankievech: The Soniferous Æther of the Land Beyond the Land Beyond. Curated by Scott McLeod, 2015.
- Yto Barrada: Beaux Gestes. Curated by Scott McLeod and Vicky Moufawad-Paul, 2015.
- Los Carpinteros: Pellejo. Curated by Scott McLeod, 2014.
- Andreas Fogarasi: 2018. Curated by Scott McLeod, 2012.
- Susan Hiller: The Last Silent Movie. Curated by Scott McLeod, 2011.
- David Lamelas: Time as Activity (Buenos Aires). Curated by Andréa Picard, 2011.
- Rabih Mroué: The Inhabitants of Images. Curated by Scott McLeod, 2011.
- Guido van der Werve: The King’s Gambit. Curated by Scott McLeod, 2010.
- Willie Doherty: Passages. Curated by Scott McLeod, 2009.
- Harun Farocki: One image doesn’t take the place of the previous one. Curated by Michèle Thériault, 2009.
- Laurent Grasso: Projection. Curated by Scott McLeod, 2008.
- Andrew Wright: Survey. Curated by Chantal Rousseau, 2008.
- Spring Hurlbut: Deuil. Curated by Scott McLeod, 2007.
- Lida Abdul: War Games. Curated by Scott McLeod, 2007.
- Robert Bean: Metamorphosis. Curated by Scott McLeod, 2007.
- Annika Larsson: Power Plays. Curated by Scott McLeod, 2006.
- Chris Marker: The Hollow Men. Curated by Sarah Robayo Sheridan, 2006.
- Lorna Simpson: 31. Curated by Betty Julian, 2005.
- Runa Islam: Scale (1/16 Inch = 1 Foot). Curated by Kenneth Hayes, 2005.
- Walid Raad: The Truth Will Be Known When the Last Witness Is Dead: Documents from the Fakhouri File in the Atlas Group Archive. Curated by Philip Monk, 2004.
- Stan Douglas: Every Building on 100 West Hastings. Curated by Scott McLeod, 2004.
- Yael Bartana: Trembling Time. Curated by Scott McLeod, 2004.

== Prefix Photo ==
Prefix Photo magazine debuted in 2000 and was named Best New Magazine at the National Magazine Awards in 2002. The magazine presents the work of emerging and established Canadian and international artists with a strong focus on the photographic arts. The magazine and the institute's other print materials are designed by Underline Studio.

Prefix Photo is released twice annually, in May and November, and is distributed internationally.

=== Issue structure ===
- Editorial
- Essays
- Literary Feature
- Portfolios
- Book Reviews
- Profile
- Newsbriefs
- Contributors
- Epilogue

=== Notable contributors ===
Prefix Photo has featured essays and creative writing by many international critics, curators and other writers, including:

- Ariella Azoulay
- Shannon Bell
- John Berger
- Lorna Brown
- Michael Crummey
- Sarindar Dhaliwal
- Hal Foster
- Peggy Gale
- Eldon Garnet
- Kenneth J. Harvey
- Jamelie Hassan
- Aleksandar Hemon
- Kyo Maclear
- Janine Marchessault
- Hans Ulrich Obrist
- Marina Roy
- Kim Sawchuk
- Allan Sekula

=== Books ===
In 2008, Prefix Press published its first book, Milk and Melancholy, by Kenneth Hayes, a Canadian curator and contemporary art critic. “Milk and Melancholy looks at milk through the lens of photography and from the angle of art.”

== Urban Field Speakers Series ==
The Urban Field Speakers Series is an international lecture series that is organized and hosted by Prefix ICA and which takes place annually between January and April. The series features lectures, symposia and discussions conducted by artists, architects, designers, curators and scholars. All presentations are centred around the theme of art’s role in the experience of urban life.
