= The Curators' Department =

Australian art consultancy

The Curators' Department is an independent curatorial consultancy based in Sydney, Australia. It was founded in 2015 by Australian curators Glenn Barkley, Holly Williams and Ivan Muñiz Reed.

== Exhibitions ==
The directors of The Curators' Department have curated numerous exhibitions in Sydney and around Australia. In 2016 Barkley curated The Australian Ceramics Association Biennial Exhibition, "OVERUNDERSIDEWAYSDOWN", which took place from May - June at Manly Art Gallery & Museum in Sydney. The previous year, Barkley curated "Turn Turn Turn: The Studio Ceramics Tradition at the National Art School" which was held at the National Art School Gallery, Sydney, from June to August 2015 and examined the history of ceramics practice at the school.

In 2015, Muñiz Reed, Williams and Barkley curated the National Visual Arts Showcase, "Right Here Now: A Powerful Regional Voice in Our Democracy" at the Museum of Democracy at Old Parliament House. Earlier that year the trio also curated the inaugural Installation Contemporary at the second iteration of the Sydney Contemporary Art Fair at Carriageworks in Sydney.

In 2015 Barkely and Muñiz Reed also curated the exhibitions "Here I Give Thanks: John R. Walker" at the Drill Hall Gallery, Canberra, and "The Daylight Moon: Rosalie Gascoigne and Lake George" at Goulburn Regional Art Gallery.

Earlier that year Barkley curated the 2015 iteration of Art Month Sydney, which included events and exhibitions at commercial galleries and other venues around the city.

Currently The Curators' Department are working with Kent Buchanan of Western Plains Cultural Centre, Dubbo and Orana Arts, on the artists residency and exhibition project At the Junction of Two Rivers: The Wellington Exchange Project. The project includes artists from the Wellington and Sydney areas, began with a residency in early 2016 and will culminate in an exhibition in October that same year.

== Writing and Publications ==
As part of his work with The Curators' Department Barkely guest edited Issue #27 of Runway Australian Experimental Art Journal. The issue was themed "Outside" and was launched at the Cementa arts festival in Kandos, NSW. He was also the guest editor of the Journal of Australian Ceramics Volume 55 Number 1.

== Consultancy ==
The Curators' Department worked with the University of Wollongong and ADM Architects to re-develop the University's Recreation and Aquatic Centre. The new space focuses on the history of the University of Wollongong, incorporating historical material and new media.

== Art Valuations ==
Barkley is a registered valuer for the Australian Government’s Cultural Gifts Program, specialising in Australian and NZ art, art archives, documentation, ephemera, textiles, ceramics, glassware, fibre items, new media, time-based and digital art; Indigenous prints, drawing, textiles, paintings and sculptures, ceramics, glassware, fibre items, new media, digital and time-based art after 1970 and European and American printmaking and artist-books after 1950.
