= Brendan Fernandes =

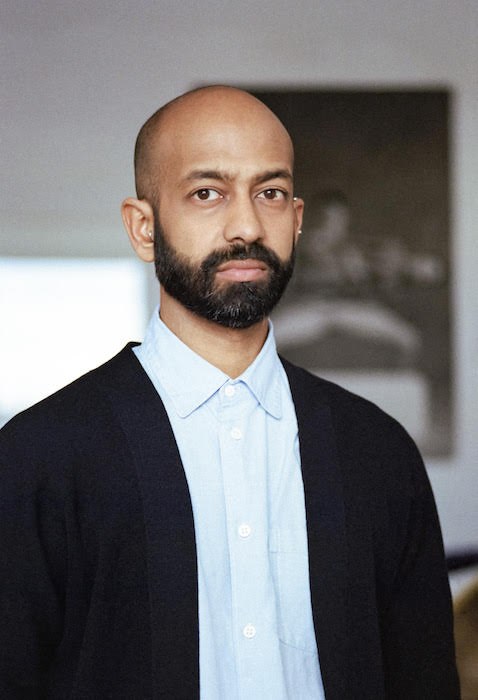
- Fernandes in 2017
- Born: 1979 (age 46–47); Nairobi, Kenya
- Awards: 2010 Sobey Art Award Short List
- Website: brendanfernandes.ca

Brendan Fernandes (born 1979) is a Canadian contemporary artist who examines issues of cultural displacement, migration, labor, queer subjectivity, and collective agency through interdisciplinary performance that uses installation, video, sculpture, and dance. He currently serves as a faculty member at Northwestern University teaching art theory and practice.

Operating at the intersection of dance and visual art, his projects raise questions about the blending of different media and aim to challenge the concept of a fixed, essential, or authentic identity. His multimedia projects engage with postcolonial and critical theory discourse. Over the course of the past two decades, Fernandes has conducted extensive research and presented performance interventions in both national and international museums, galleries, and cultural institutions. He has also showcased his work in prominent museums in his home city of Chicago.

In his current work, Fernandes focuses on the diverse meanings of the body, seeing it as both a culturally significant object and an expressive tool for individuality and identity. He uses choreography to explore movement, particularly in queer and laboring bodies, examining their impact on gender roles and physicality. Additionally, Fernandes' art questions social and political issues, reflecting on life during and after the pandemic and events like Black Lives Matter. He draws upon incidents like the Pulse Orlando massacre and ongoing violence in queer spaces, aiming to challenge power structures and promote inclusivity and equity.

== Early life ==
Fernandes was born in Nairobi, Kenya, in 1979. His family, Indians in Kenya of Goan descent, who lived in Africa for five generations, moved to Canada when he was nine years old due to political unrest. Fernandes went to school in Newmarket, Ontario.

== Education ==
Fernandes trained professionally as a ballet dancer, but tore his hamstring during his senior year in college, and the injury ended his dance career. He went on to train as a visual artist and completed his Bachelor of Fine Arts degree at York University in Toronto, and then pursued a Master of Fine Arts at the University of Western Ontario, in London, Ontario. In 2007, he graduated from the Independent Study Program at the Whitney Museum of American Art in Manhattan, New York.

== Awards and recognition ==
Fernandes was a 2010 Sobey Art Award nominee and awarded the Robert Rauschenberg Fellowship (2014). He has also been the recipient of the 2017 Canada Council New Chapters grant, the Artadia Award (2019), a Smithsonian Artist Research Fellowship (2020), and a Louis Comfort Tiffany Foundation grant (2019).

His projects have been presented at venues, including the Solomon R. Guggenheim Museum (New York), the Museum of Modern Art (New York), The Getty Museum (Los Angeles), and the National Gallery of Canada (Ottawa).

== Exhibitions and performances ==
Fernandes exhibited a series of sculptures and live performances at The Graham Foundation titled The Master and Form, in 2018. The series explored mastery and discipline within the culture of ballet through the use of designed objects that enable dancers to perfect and extend iconic positions. This work was featured in the 2019 Biennial at the Whitney Museum of American Art.

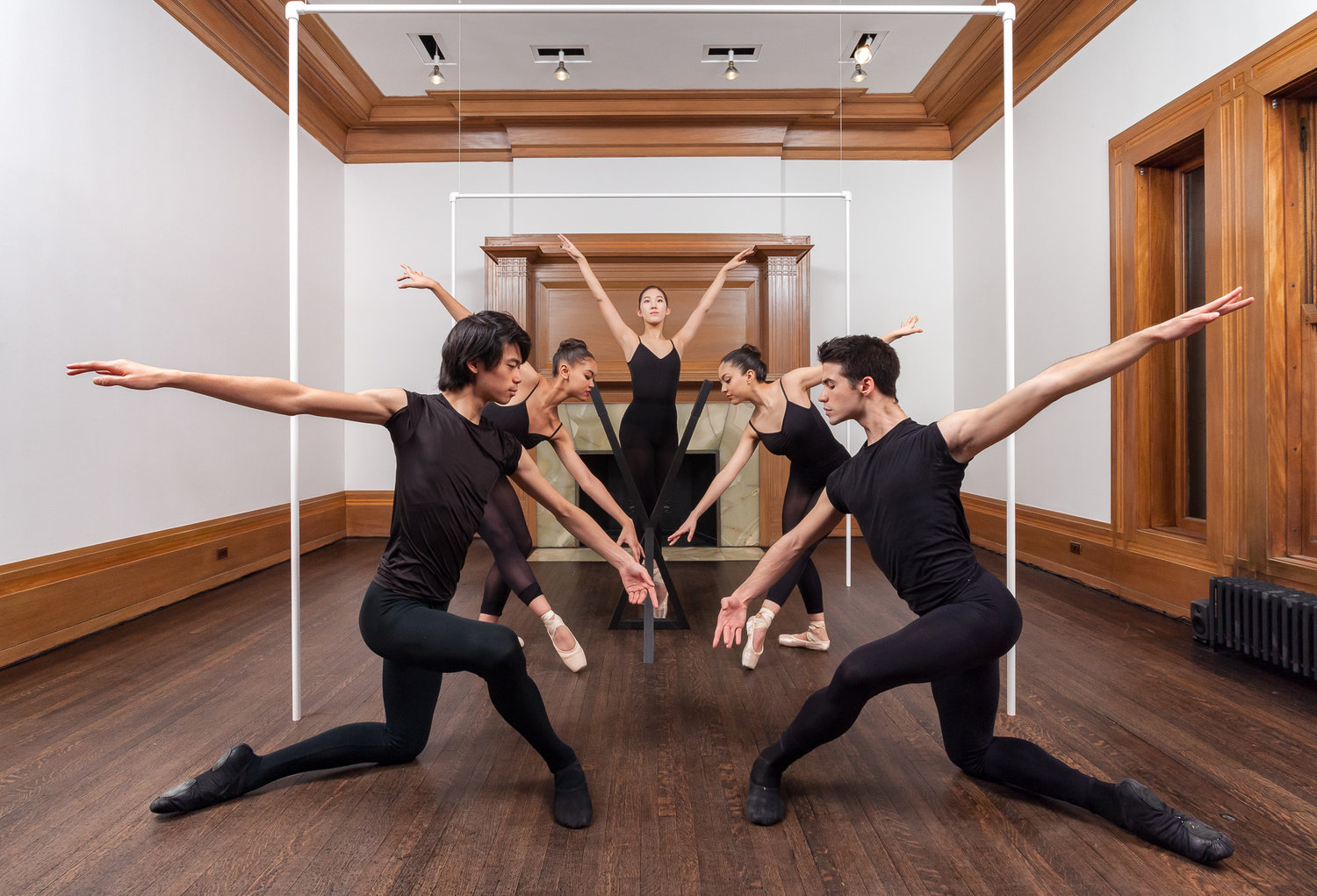
Master and Form, Performance/Installation for The Graham Foundation

In 2017 at the Getty Museum in Los Angeles Fernandes presented Free Fall 49, a work that addressed the 2016 massacre at The Pulse Nightclub in Orlando. The performance was a choreography of eight dancers, improvised over two hours of music produced by Tom Krell of How to Dress Well. Music samples interspersed at abrupt intervals – reminiscent of the staccato of gunfire, the beat cut into the propulsive music 49 times, cuing the dancers first to hit the ground, then rise in moments of memorial and resurrection. This performance art piece was later presented in the Kogod Courtyward of the Smithsonian American Art Museum in June 2019.

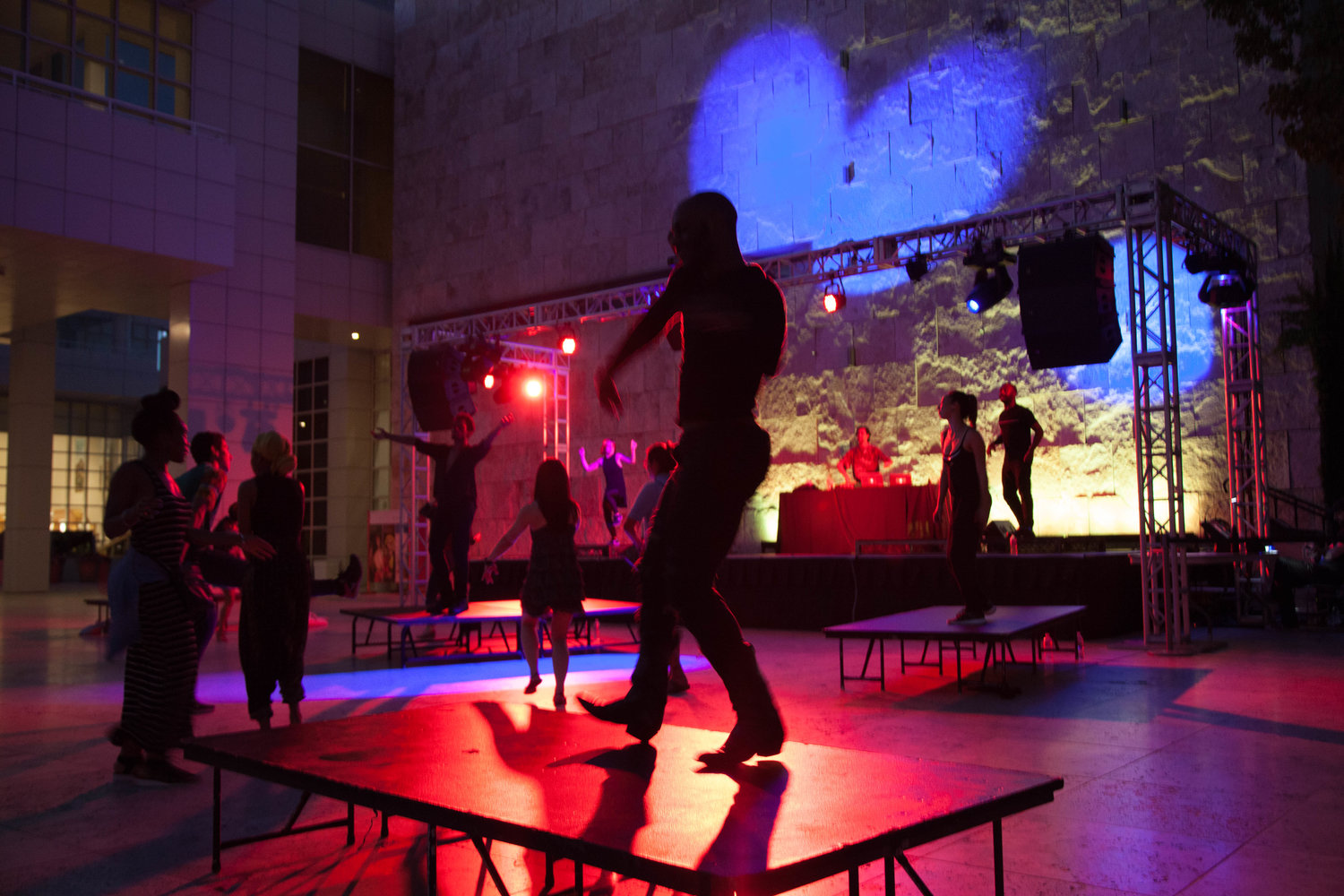
Free Fall 49, performed at The Getty (2017)

In 2011, Fernandes was included in Found in Translation, exhibition at The Solomon R Guggenheim Museum, New York.

On the occasion of Fernandes' Noguchi Museum project he has published a book titled Re/Form in 2022.
