= Karin Davie =

Canadian artist (born 1965)

- Born: 1965; Toronto
- Known for: contemporary painter

Karin Davie (born 1965) is a contemporary artist who lives and works in New York City and Seattle, Washington.

== Biography ==
Davie was born in Toronto, Canada. She attended Queen's University at Kingston and the Rhode Island School of Design (RISD). Davie received a Canada Council art grant in 1992 and 1995, an Elizabeth Foundation Grant in 1998, an American Academy of Arts & Letters award in 1999, and a Pollock-Krasner Foundation grant in 1991 and 1999. Davie received a Guggenheim Fellowship in 2015.

== Work ==
Davie is best known for her idiosyncratic twist on the modernist 'stripe' and looping hyperbolic abstractions. Her contemporary practice has been viewed in context with ideas of painting-as-performance from 1950s Abstract Expressionism and the 1960s Op Art.

Jan Allen has said that Davie's painting practice "...is a compelling evocation of stamina, evasion, and voracious sensuality. A persistent, undulating rhythm of hiding and revealing, of unseen machinations beneath surfaces, courses through all Davies' work. On a certain level, the diverse cultural productions and visual effects that the artist cites as inspiration for her painting – films, cartoons, reflections in a glossy fender or the swaying figure of a woman walking in a striped dress – are cover stories for, or approximations of, a deeper aesthetic investigation."

Jen Graves has said that "Davie has said she thinks of her paintings as parodies of the motions her body has to do to make them." The artist has stated, "The paintings are constructed from repetitive physical movements. I think of 'the gestures' as behaviors that are both informal and obsessive as opposed to grand and aggressive. I am interested in a visual reflection of the complex psychological and social relationships that persist over time to concepts of the 'self' and 'body' in painting."

A survey exhibition of Davie's work "Karin Davie: Dangerous Curves", was held at the Albright Knox Art Gallery in 2006.

== Collections ==
Work by the artist is held in the public collections of various museums including the Albright Knox Art Gallery, Buffalo, New York; The Seattle Art Museum, Seattle, Washington; the Nerman Museum of Contemporary Art, Overland Park, Kansas; and the Smithsonian American Art Museum.

== See also ==
- Op Art
- Feminism
- Abstraction
