= Charles Stankievech =

Canadian artist (born 1978)

- Born: 1978 (age 47–48)
- Known for: artist, writer, educator and curator
- Movement: Conceptual art
- Website: www.stankievech.net

Charles Stankievech (born 1978) is a Canadian artist, writer, publisher and curator.

== Early life and education ==
Stankievech was born in 1978 in Okotoks, Alberta. He graduated with an MFA from Concordia University in Montreal, later moving to Dawson City in 2007 where he was a founding member of the Yukon School of Visual Art. He stayed in Yukon for five years, moving full-time to Berlin in 2012.

== Art career ==
External videos
- The 2016 Sobey Art Award - Charles Stankievech (2:10 min), National Gallery of Canada, retrieved 27 April 2025 – via YouTube

Many of his works critically engage military architecture and surveillance and is a driving force behind the idea of fieldwork in contemporary art.

Stankievech participated in the Canadian Forces Artists Program twice, in 2011 and 2015, creating a "transformation" of the program through critical contemporary art. His 2013 35mm film installation The Soniferous Æther of the Land Beyond the Land Beyond was shot over the course of two weeks at CFS Alert (the northernmost settlement on Earth), and is part of a series of fieldworks he made that look at remote outpost architecture, military infrastructure, and the embedded landscape. The film, along with a custom built 35mm film looping projection system, is part of the Montreal Museum of Fine Arts collection.

In 2014, Stankievech's exhibition Counterintelligence premiered at the Justina M. Barnicke Gallery at the University of Toronto. A "careful archival research" exhibition with "provocative implications" according to Artforum, Murray Whyte of the Toronto Star described it as "a dizzying array of material, some of it absurd, much of it shocking". The exhibition was awarded both Thematic Exhibition of the Year and best Catalogue Essay for 2014 by the Ontario Association of Art Galleries. In 2011 Stankievech was the West Coast and Yukon nominee and in 2016 the Ontario nominee for the Sobey Art Award. Stankievech's exhibition Monuments as Ruin was awarded an Ontario Association of Art Galleries 2015 Exhibition of the Year Award and was acquired by the AEAC at Queen's University.

Stankievech's ambitious exhibition The Desert Turned To Glass (2023) was commissioned for the centenary of the invention of the planetarium and revolved around an immersive film "The Eye of Silence" projected on a dome screen. The work in its various forms has since toured from Calgary to Berlin, Hamburg, Copenhagen, Düsseldorf, Oakville, Prague, Munich, and the Rjiksmuseum Twenthe.

== Publishing ==
In 2011, Stankievech co-founded the Press K. Verlag in Dawson City / Berlin. The first imprints were registered with ISBNs in Canada with later imprints in Germany when he moved there full-time. The press was named "K." after the character in Kafka's writing, whom Stankievech wrote a thesis on in 2002.

From 2015 to 2025, he was an Editor of Afterall Journal, a peer-review journal published by the University of Chicago Press.
