= Galeries Ontario / Ontario Galleries =

The Galeries Ontario / Ontario Galleries (GOG), formerly Ontario Association of Art Galleries / Association Ontarienne des Galeries d’Art (OAAG/AOGA), is a Canadian art organization founded in 1968. It was incorporated in Ontario in 1970, and registered as a charitable organization. It is a successor organization to the Southern Ontario Gallery Group founded in 1947, renamed the Art Institute of Ontario in 1952. In December 2020 Ontario Association of Art Galleries / Association Ontarienne des Galeries d’Art (OAAG/AOGA) rebranded to the name Galeries Ontario / Ontario Galleries (GOG) which included new brand identity, logo, and website to better serve art organizations in Ontario and Canada.

GOG is an art service organization serving over 270 Public Art Galleries, museums, artist-run-centres, and arts organizations, through advocacy, professional development, and network-building. GOG fosters a sustainable, healthy, diverse public art gallery sector to further the visual arts as a key component of the cultural life of the province.

Zainub Verjee was appointed as the executive director in 2015.

== Board of directors ==
Serving to AGM 2020

- York Lethbridge - Board President [2017-2020]

Serving to AGM 2021

- Dawn Owen - Board Member [2015-2018][2018-2021]
- Glen Bloom - Board Member [2018-2021]
- Devyani Saltzman - Board Secretary [2018-2021]

Serving to AGM 2022

- Christian Bernard Singer - Board Vice-president [2016-2019][2019-2022]
- Robert Steven - Board Treasurer [2016-2019][2019-2022]

Serving to AGM 2022

- Shelley Falconer - Board Member [2019-2022]
- Ann MacDonald - Board Member [2019-2022]

Serving to AGM 2023

- Nahed Mansour - Board Member [2019-2023]

Ex-Officio

- Zainub Verjee

== Founding member galleries ==
There are eleven founding members of the modern organization. The founding members are:

- Agnes Etherington Art Centre, Kingston
- Art Gallery of Hamilton
- Art Gallery of Ontario, Toronto (formerly Art Gallery of Toronto)
- Justina M. Barnicke Gallery (formerly Hart House), University of Toronto
- Kitchener/Waterloo Art Gallery
- London Regional and Historical Museums (London Public Library and Art Museum)
- National Gallery of Canada, Ottawa
- Royal Ontario Museum, Toronto
- Sarnia Public Library and Art Gallery
- Rodman Hall Art Centre (formerly St. Catharines and District Arts Council)
- Art Gallery of Windsor (formerly Willistead Art Gallery

== Services ==
=== Advocacy ===
GOG's advocacy initiatives are a pillar of their service to the sector. These services include lobbying, outreach and education, among others. The organization works on behalf of public art galleries, and the cultural sector in Canada as a whole, to increase public awareness of issues affecting the visual arts and culture sectors in Ontario and Canada.

=== Professional Development ===
GOG produces professional development opportunities designed to increase the capacity of their members to navigate and advance in the cultural sector, taking the form of workshops, think tanks, symposiums and other initiatives. These professional development opportunities cover a wide range of relevant topics, including emerging technologies, new ways of working, accessibility, strategy, and engagement. The programmes are mainly tailored for emerging to senior-level arts professionals working in Ontario's public art galleries, but are often applicable to arts professionals across the board. GOG's membership program and various initiatives also serve as tools for network building to strengthen the body of public galleries across Ontario.

== Membership ==
Most member galleries participate in a reciprocal admissions program, where membership of one gallery gives admission to the others. The organization provides a liaison between galleries and the Ontario Arts Council.

Members can join as an institution (public art galleries or affiliate organizations), individual (someone who works in an art gallery, or a student) or business (commercial galleries or other for-profit groups).

GOG's membership consists of over 270 art museums, public art galleries, artist-run centres, visual arts organizations, professional colleagues, and friends across Ontario, including:

- A Space Gallery, Toronto
- Agnes Etherington Art Centre, Kingston
- Agnes Jamieson Gallery, Minden
- Art Gallery of Algoma, Sault Ste. Marie
- Art Gallery of Burlington
- Art Gallery of Guelph
- Art Gallery of Hamilton
- Art Gallery of Mississauga
- Art Gallery of Northumberland, Cobourg
- Art Gallery of Ontario, Toronto
- Art Gallery of Peterborough
- Art Gallery of Sudbury / Galerie d'art de Sudbury
- Art Gallery of Windsor
- Art Gallery of York University, Toronto
- Art Museum, at the University of Toronto
- Bata Shoe Museum, Toronto
- Belleville Public Library and Art Gallery
- The Blackwood, at the University of Toronto Mississauga
- Cambridge Galleries
- Campus Gallery: Georgian College, Barrie
- Canadian Clay and Glass Gallery, Waterloo
- Carleton University Art Gallery, Ottawa
- Craft Ontario, Toronto
- Design Exchange, Toronto
- Doris McCarthy Gallery at the University of Toronto Scarborough
- Durham Art Gallery, Durham, West Grey
- Durham West Arts Centre, Ajax
- Etobicoke Civic Centre Art Gallery, Toronto
- Gallery 1313, Queen Street West, Toronto
- Gallery 44 Centre for Contemporary Photography, Toronto
- Gallery Arcturus, Garden District, Toronto
- Gallery in the Grove, Bright's Grove
- Gallery Stratford
- Gallery TPW, Toronto
- Gardiner Museum of Ceramic Art, Toronto
- Gibson Gallery, Fort Malden Guild of Arts and Crafts, Amherstburg
- Glenhyrst Art Gallery of Brant, Brantford
- Grimsby Public Art Gallery
- Haliburton Sculpture Forest, Haliburton
- Harboufront Centre, Toronto
- Homer Watson House & Gallery, Kitchener
- Humber Galleries and Collection, Toronto
- John B. Aird Gallery, Mowat Block, Toronto
- Judith & Norman Alix Art Gallery, Sarnia
- Kitchener-Waterloo Art Gallery
- Koffler Gallery, Toronto
- Kawartha Art Gallery, Lindsay, Ontario
- Latcham Art Centre, Stouffville
- Leamington Arts Centre
- Living Arts Centre, Mississauga
- MacLaren Art Centre, Barrie
- Market Gallery, Toronto
- McIntosh Gallery at The University of Western Ontario, London
- McMaster Museum of Art, Hamilton
- McMichael Canadian Art Collection, Kleinburg
- Mercer Union, A Centre for Contemporary Art, Toronto
- Museum London
- Museum of Contemporary Art, Toronto
- National Gallery of Canada, Ottawa
- Neilson Park Creative Centre, Toronto
- Niagara Falls Art Gallery
- Niagara Pumphouse Visual Arts Centre, Niagara-on-the-Lake
- Norfolk Arts Centre, Simcoe
- Oakville Galleries
- Open Studio, Toronto
- Orillia Museum of Art & History
- The Ottawa Art Gallery / La Galerie d'art d'Ottawa
- Peel Art Museum and Archives, Brampton
- Penetanguishene Centennial Museum & Archives
- Power Plant Contemporary Art Centre at Harbourfront Centre, Toronto
- Prefix Institute of Contemporary Art, Toronto
- Rails End Gallery, Haliburton
- Registered Graphic Designers of Ontario, Toronto
- RiverBrink Art Museum, Queenston
- Robert Langen Art Gallery at Wilfrid Laurier University, Waterloo
- The Robert McLaughlin Gallery, Oshawa
- Rodman Hall Art Centre, Brock University, St. Catharines
- Rotunda Gallery Kitchener City Hall
- St. Thomas-Elgin Public Art Centre, St. Thomas
- Station Gallery, Whitby
- Stephen Bulger Gallery, Toronto
- Sur Gallery, Toronto
- Temiskaming Art Gallery, Haileybury
- TD Gallery, Toronto Reference Library, Toronto
- Textile Museum of Canada, Toronto
- Thames Art Gallery, Chatham
- Thunder Bay Art Gallery
- Timmins Museum: National Exhibition Centre, South Porcupine
- Tom Thomson Art Gallery, Owen Sound
- University of Waterloo Art Gallery, Waterloo
- Varley Art Gallery, Markham
- Visual Arts Centre of Clarington, Bowmanville
- WKP Kennedy Gallery, North Bay
- Woodland Cultural Centre, Brantford
- Woodstock Art Gallery
- Ydessa Hendeles Art Foundation, Toronto

== Selected publications ==
- Krueger, Pamela (1991), Why you need a conservator : limitations of a gallery in coping with collections management, Toronto: Ontario Association of Art Galleries, ISBN 0-9694987-3-X
- Mibach, Lisa (1991), Conservation cooperatives : existing models, Toronto: Ontario Association of Art Galleries, ISBN 0-9694987-4-8
- Nasby, Judith (1991), The partnership between curator and conservator : effective collections care, Toronto: Ontario Association of Art Galleries, ISBN 0-9694987-5-6
- "Seminar and conservation survey" Roche, Roger. 1972
- Wellheiser, Joanne (1991), Preventive conservation : the key to preservation, Toronto: Ontario Association of Art Galleries, ISBN 0-9694987-6-4
- Cossman, Brenda (1995), Censorship and the arts : law, controversy, debate, facts, Toronto: Ontario Assoc. of Art Galleries, ISBN 0-9694987-9-9
- Agnew, Ella (1991), Legaleasy : a step-by-step legal guide to collecting for Canadian art galleries and museums, Toronto: Ontario Association of Art Galleries, ISBN 0-9694987-1-3
- Zemans, Joyce (2001), Art gallery handbook, Toronto: Ontario Association of Art Galleries, ISBN 0-9681238-1-3
- Calculating the economic impact of cultural organizations, Toronto: OAAG, 1984, ISBN 0-9690187-4-6
