= Walter Seymour Allward =

Canadian sculptor (1874–1955)

Walter Seymour Allward CMG RCA
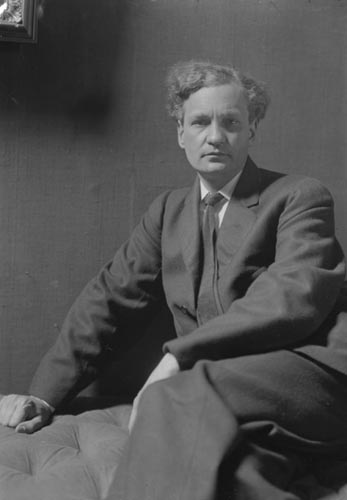
- Walter Allward in 1913
- Born: 18 November 1874; Toronto, Ontario, Canada
- Died: 24 April 1955 (aged 78); Toronto, Ontario, Canada
- Occupations: Monument sculptor and designer
- Spouse: Margaret Kennedy (m. 1898)

Walter Seymour Allward CMG RCA (18 November 1874 – 24 April 1955) was a Canadian monumental sculptor best known for the Canadian National Vimy Memorial. Featuring expressive classical figures within modern compositions, Allward's monuments evoke themes of memory, sacrifice, and redemption. He has been widely praised for his "original sense of spatial composition, his mastery of the classical form and his brilliant craftsmanship".

Allward's 1917 heroic monument, the Bell Telephone Memorial, has been seen as the finest example of his early works. It brought the sculptor fame and led to Allward later creating the Canadian National Vimy Memorial in France, his most renowned work. Some of the sculptor's works have also been acquired by the National Gallery in Ottawa, Ontario, Canada. In addition to his sculptural works, Allward produced a series of approximately one hundred allegorical drawings exploring the subject of war at the onset of the Second World War.

Allward has been described as "probably Canada's most important monumental sculptor in the first third of [the 20th] century". However, his name was largely forgotten following his death in 1955 until 2001, when he was portrayed as a fictional character in Jane Urquhart's celebrated novel The Stone Carvers.

== Early life ==
Allward was born in Toronto, the son of John A. Allward and Emma Pittman of Newfoundland. Educated in Toronto public schools, his first job was at the age of 14 as an assistant to his carpenter father. Allward first served an apprenticeship with the architectural firm Gibson and Simpson before working at the Don Valley Brick Works, where he modelled architectural ornaments. There he showed skill in clay mold making. This early training, supplemented by modelling classes at the New Technical School, prepared Allward for his lifelong career as a monumental sculptor.

== Body of works ==
=== Early work ===
Allward's first commission was for the figure of Peace on the Memorial of the Battles in the North-West (1895) in Queen's Park, Toronto. He won this competition at the age of nineteen, despite possessing minimal training as a sculptor. Other early works included a life-sized figure of Dr Oronhyatekha commissioned by the Independent Order of Foresters for the opening of the Temple Building in Toronto (1899), and the Old Soldier, commemorating the War of 1812 in Toronto's Portland Square (now Victoria Memorial Square) (1903). Also in 1903, he was elected an associate of the Royal Canadian Academy and in 1918 became a full academician. Now well established he received commissions to do busts of Lord Tennyson, Sir Charles Tupper, Sir Wilfrid Laurier and others. On the grounds of Queen's Park are statues of General John Graves Simcoe and Sir Oliver Mowat, completed in 1903 and 1905 respectively.

=== Heroic monuments ===
Allward's true talent lay in his heroic monuments. These included the design work for the Boer War Memorial Fountain in Windsor, Ontario (1906), the South African War Memorial in Toronto (1910), The Baldwin-Lafontaine Monument on Parliament Hill in Ottawa (1914) and the Bell Memorial commemorating Alexander Graham Bell's invention of telephone in Brantford, Ontario (1917). Allward had also completed design work on a memorial to King Edward VII but the onset of the World War I prevented its completion. The figures of Veritas (Truth) and Iustitia (Justice) were cast in bronze for the memorial. They were found in their crates in 1969 buried under a parking lot, and in 1970 were installed outside the Supreme Court of Canada in Ottawa. Allward also designed numerous municipal cenotaphs around the country, including the Stratford Memorial (1922), the Peterborough Memorial (1929) and the Brant War Memorial (1933).

=== Bell Memorial ===
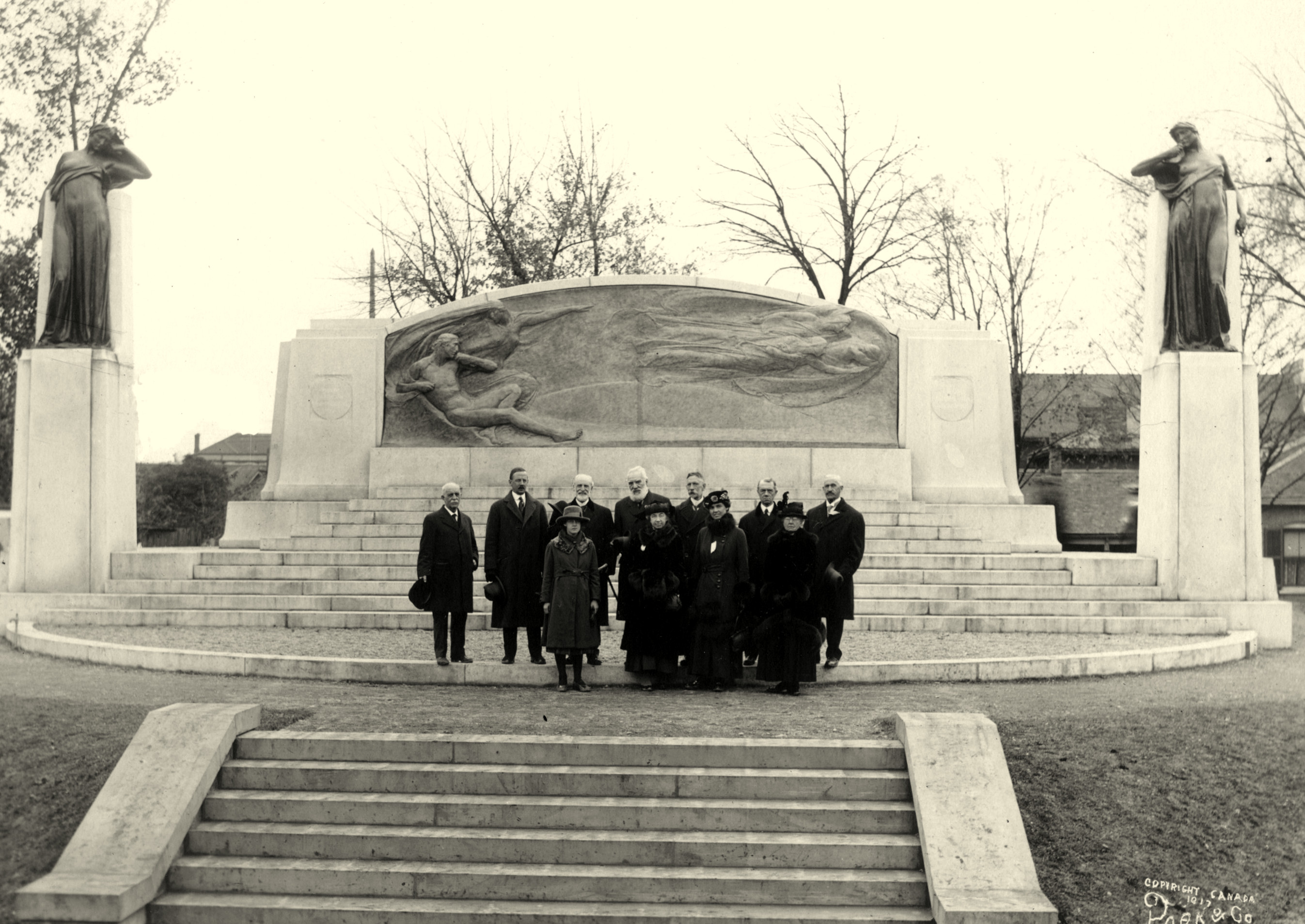
Dedication of the memorial, including Alexander Graham Bell, members of his family plus committee members

In 1906 the citizens of the Brantford and Brant County areas formed the Bell Memorial Association to commemorate the invention of the telephone by Alexander Graham Bell in July 1874 at his parents' home, Melville House, in Brantford, Ontario. Allward's design was the unanimous choice from among 10 submitted models, winning the competition. The memorial was originally to be completed by 1912 but Allward did not finish it until five years later. The Governor General of Canada, Victor Cavendish, 9th Duke of Devonshire, ceremoniously unveiled the memorial on 24 October 1917.

Allward designed the monument to symbolize the telephone's ability to overcome distances. A series of steps lead to the main section where the allegorical figures of Inspiration appears over a reclining male figure representing Man, the inventor, and also pointing to the floating figures of Knowledge, Joy, and Sorrow, positioned at the other end of the tableau. At each end of the memorial there are two female figures mounted on granite pedestals representing Humanity, one sending and the other receiving a message.

The Bell Telephone Memorial's grandeur has been described as the finest example of Allward's early work, propelling the sculptor to fame. The memorial itself has been used as a central fixture for many civic events and remains an important part of Brantford's history, helping the city style itself as "The Telephone City".

=== Vimy Memorial ===
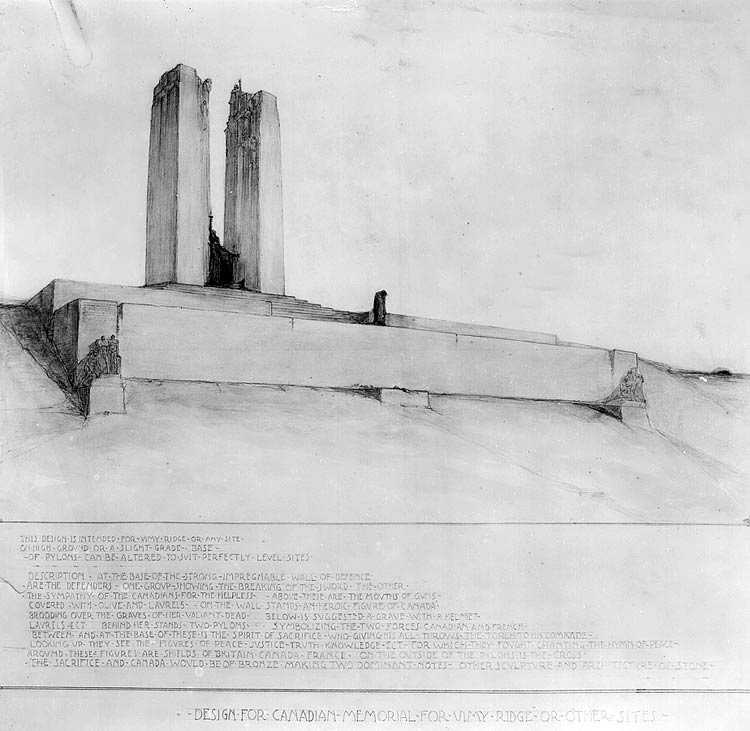
Allward's final design

The most important and famous commission Allward received was for the monument to commemorate Canadians killed in the First World War, a project which would occupy him from 1921 till the memorial's unveiling, by King Edward VIII, on 26 July 1936. There was a huge crowd of approximately 100,000 people present at the ceremony including over 50,000 Canadian and French veterans and their families. The Vimy Memorial was designated as a National Historic Site of Canada in 1996. After a $30 million restoration, the monument was re-dedicated on 9 April 2007.

Allward had made 150 design sketches before submitting the final plan which won the commission from the Canadian federal government. The Canadian Battlefields Memorials Commission eventually selected Vimy Ridge as the location for the memorial, due largely to its elevation above the plain below, as the preferred site of Allward's design. The site (Hill 145) was donated by France in perpetuity. In June 1922, Allward set up a studio in London, England and toured for more almost two years to find a stone of the right colour, texture, and luminosity for the memorial. He eventually found it in the ruins of Diocletian's Palace. Known as Seget limestone, it was a stone that came from an ancient Roman quarry located in Croatia. The stone had to be first quarried then shipped by boat to France and then transported to Vimy Ridge by truck and by rail.

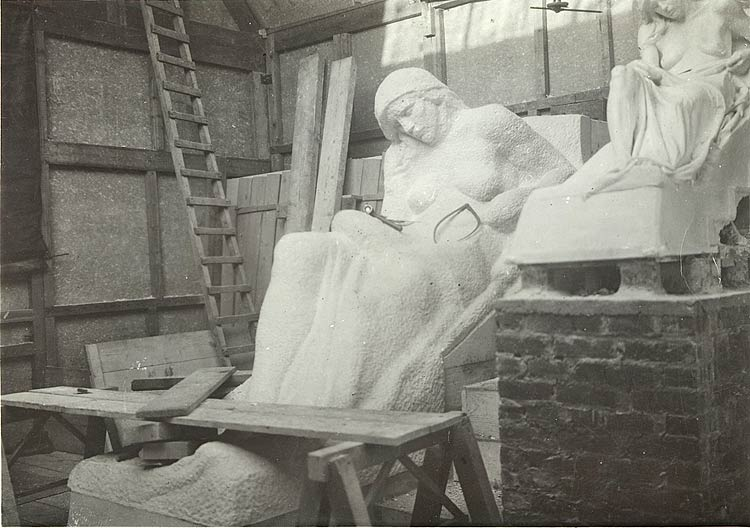
Statue carving in progress

Allward chose a relatively new construction method, a cast concrete frame to which the limestone was bonded. The memorial base and twin pylons contain almost 6,000 tonnes of Seget limestone on a bed of about 15,000 tonnes of concrete. The 20 sculptured symbolic figures, representing Christian and universal virtues, were actually carved where they now stand, from the huge blocks of stone. The professional carvers used life-size plaster models produced by Allward in his London studio and an enlarging instrument called a pantograph to make calculations that allowed for reproducing the figures at double life-size. All this work was carried out inside temporary studios built around each figure, including those at the top of the pylons. The first figure to be completed was Canada Bereft, which stands at the top of the front wall of the Vimy Memorial and recalls traditional depictions of the Virgin Mary in mourning. Canada Bereft is now one of the most well-known sculptures in Canadian art. The figures atop the pylons represent the universal virtues of charity, faith, honour, hope, justice, knowledge, peace, and truth. Truth and Knowledge have the wings of angels—an attribute usually associated with representations of Victory, which is not included in this monument to grief.

Left-front view showing an entire aspect of the Memorial

Most of the original plaster figures are stored at the Canadian War Museum in Ottawa.

The final step called for carving the names of 11,285 Canadians who were killed in France and are buried in unknown sites on the memorial's walls. The time required to build the massive concrete and steel base, to obtain some 6,000 tons of stone from Croatia, to build roads and clear the site of mines and graves, as well as other issues, led to significant delays. In 1930, Prime Minister R. B. Bennett insisted that the project be completed by 1932 but that deadline was missed by four years. The total cost was approximately $1.5 million.

== Works ==
Work	Date	Location	Notes	Image
Peace (North-West Rebellion Memorial)	1895	Queen's Park, Toronto		
Sculpture of Oronhyatekha	1899	Temple Building, Toronto	Commissioned by Oronhyatekha and the Independent Order of Foresters to mark the opening of the Temple Building. Relocated to Forester House at 789 Don Mills Road 1970.	
Old Soldier	1903	Victoria Memorial Square, Toronto	Commemorates the War of 1812	
Sculpture of John Graves Simcoe	1903	Queen's Park, Toronto	First Lieutenant-Governor of Upper Canada	
Sculpture of Sir Oliver Mowat	1905	Queen's Park, Toronto	Third Premier of Ontario	
Boer War Memorial Fountain	1906	Windsor, Ontario		
Sculpture of John Sandfield Macdonald	1909	Queen's Park, Toronto	First Premier of Ontario	
South African War Memorial	1910	University Avenue, Toronto		
Death Mask of Professor Goldwin Smith	1910	Art Gallery of Ontario, Toronto		
Sculpture of Robert Baldwin and Louis-Hippolyte Lafontaine	1914	Parliament Hill, Ottawa		
Bell Telephone Memorial	1917	Bell Memorial Gardens, Brantford, Ontario	Commemorates the invention of the telephone by Alexander Graham Bell in 1874 at his parents' home in Brantford, Ontario	
Veritas (Truth)	1920	Supreme Court of Canada, Ottawa	Cast for the never finished memorial to King Edward VII, and found buried in 1969. Installed in front of the Supreme Court of Canada in 1970.	
Justitia (Justice)	1920	Supreme Court of Canada, Ottawa	See Veritas, above	
Stratford Cenotaph	1922	Stratford, Ontario		
Citizens' War Memorial	1929	Peterborough, Ontario		
Brant County War Memorial	1933	Brantford, Ontario		
Canadian National Vimy Memorial	1936	Vimy Ridge (near Vimy, Pas-de-Calais), France		
Bust of William Lyon Mackenzie	1940	Queen's Park, Toronto		

== Honours ==
In 1944, he was made a Companion of the Order of St Michael and St George "for distinguished service to Canadian Art". He was also a member of the Royal Canadian Academy of Arts. On 30 June 1938, he was recognized by Prime Minister William Lyon Mackenzie King in a motion before the House of Commons of Canada which stated "that this house desires particularly to express its appreciation of the services of Mr. Walter S. Allward, who, as the designer and Canadian War Memorials architect of the memorial at Vimy, has given to the world, a work of art of outstanding beauty and character. Through the years to come the Vimy Memorial will remain the symbol of Canada's efforts in the war, and its tribute to those who, on the field of battle, sought to preserve the free institutions of mankind."

Allward has been designated as an Historic Person in the Directory of Federal Heritage Designations.

== Legacy ==
The art of Walter Allward lives on in numerous substantial monument and designs in Canada and abroad. He was first elected a member of the Royal Canadian Academy of Arts in 1903, and his bronze diploma work of 1920, The Storm, was acquired for the National Gallery of Canada. He is a character in Jane Urquhart's book The Stone Carvers.
