= Temple Building (Toronto) =

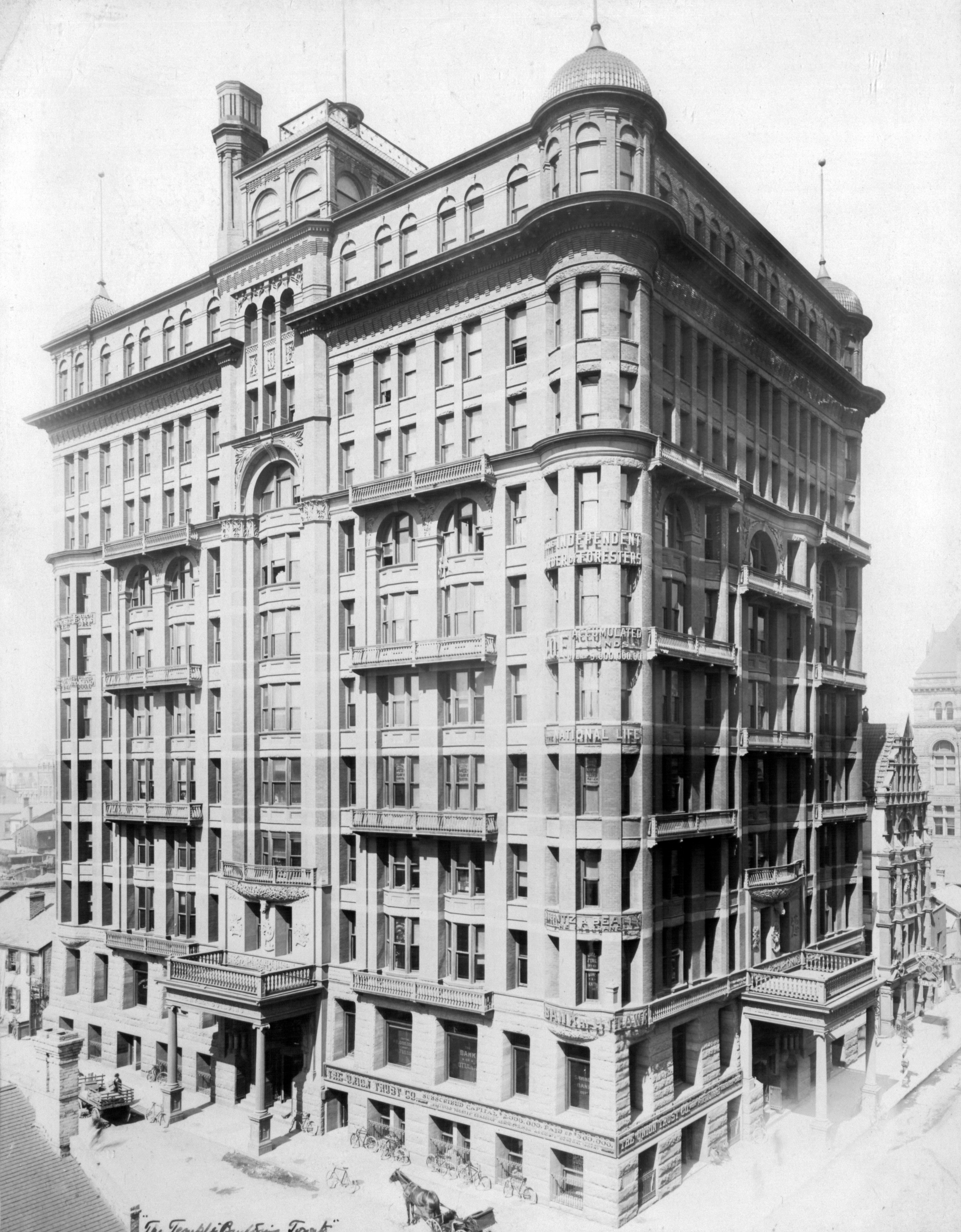
- The Temple Building in 1902
- Interactive map of the Temple Building area
- Alternative names: Temple of the Independent Order of Foresters

General information
- Status: Demolished
- Type: Commercial offices
- Architectural style: Romanesque Revival
- Location: 62 Richmond Street West; Toronto, Ontario Canada
- Coordinates: 43.6513°N 79.3818°W
- Completed: 1895-1896
- Demolished: 1970

Height
- Height: 36.93 m (121.2 ft)

Technical details
- Floor count: 12

Design and construction
- Architect: George Wallace Gouinlock

The Temple Building was a 12-storey, 36.93-metre (121.2 ft) highrise erected at 62 Richmond Street West and Bay Street in Toronto, Ontario.

== History ==
Regarded as one of the city's first skyscrapers, it was completed in 1896 to house the world headquarters of the Independent Order of Foresters, which was a friendly society that acted as both a fraternal order and an important financial institution. The IOF was then run by the energetic Oronhyatekha who commissioned the grand structure. It was designed by George W. Gouinlock, who looked to Chicago's high rise buildings, and specifically the Rookery Building, for inspiration.

The building was located at Richmond and Bay Street. Upon its completion it was Toronto's tallest building, a title it would hold until the Trader's Bank Building was built in 1905. Foresters left the building in 1953 for a new building at 590 Jarvis Street at Charles Street (later as Metro Toronto Police HQ and demolished).

The building was demolished in 1970 to make way for the Queen-Bay Centre (120m 32 floor Munich Re Centre built 1973 and 105m 25 floor Thomson Building built 1972) which still stands on the site.

The IOF relocated to Don Mills in 1967 to Foresters House at 789 Don Mills Road.

== Legacy ==
A portion of the facade of this building can be found at Guild Park and Gardens in Scarborough.

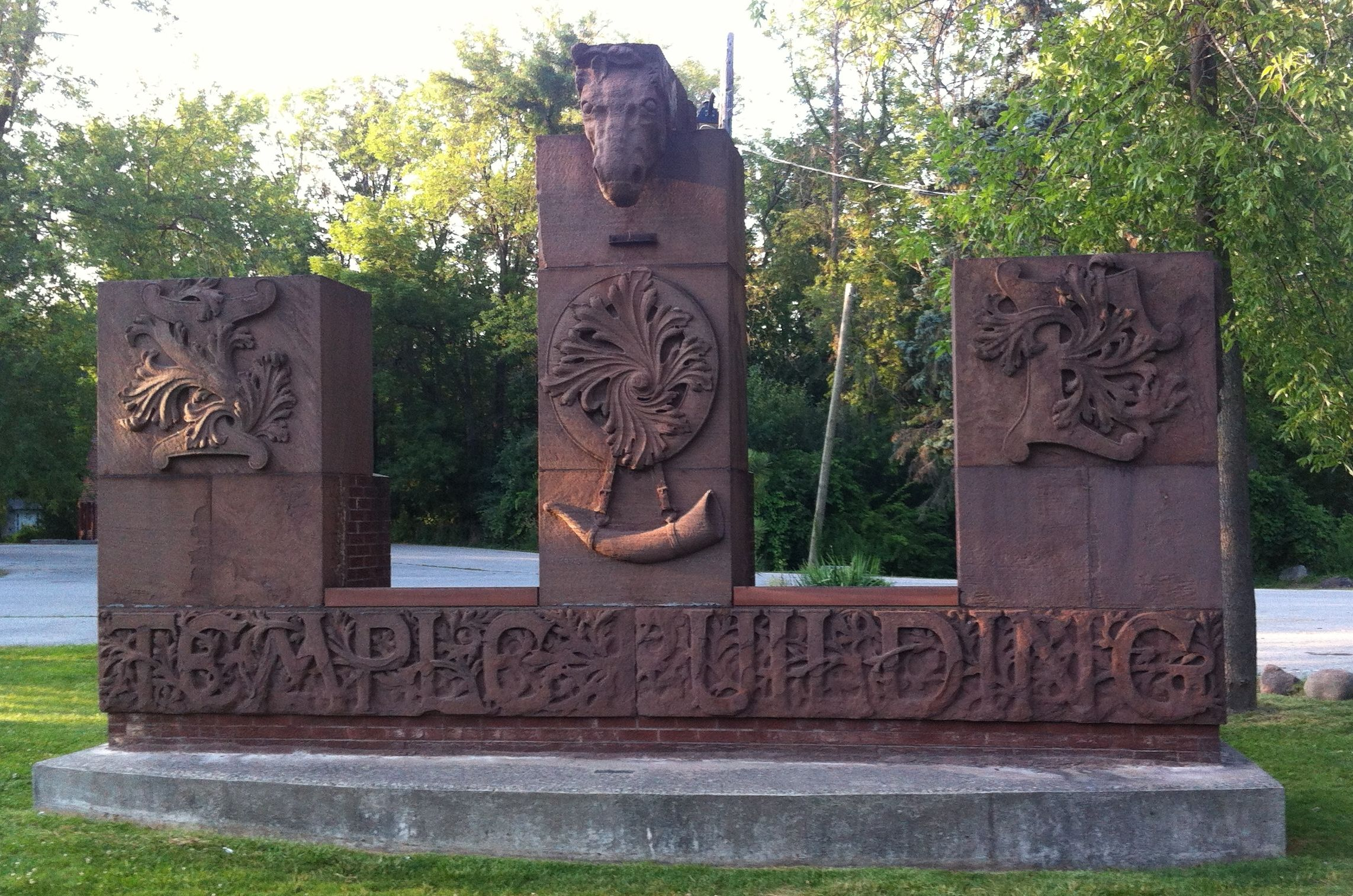
The remains of the Temple Building at Guild Park and Gardens.
