= Avantax =

Tax-focused independent broker-dealer

Avantax, Inc.
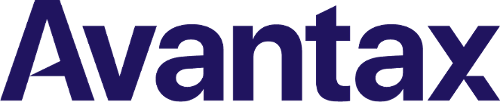
- Type: Private
- Industry: Financial services
- Headquarters: Dallas, Texas, United States
- Area served: United States
- Key people: Todd Mackay (President)
- Revenue: $666 Million
- AUM: US$ $92+ billion (2020)
- Number of employees: Approx. 727
- Parent: Cetera (2023–present)
- Website: avantax.com

Avantax is a tax-focused independent broker-dealer in the United States. On November 28, 2023, Cetera Financial Group completed the acquisition of Avantax.

== History ==
Avantax (originally Blucora, Inc.) was formed in 1996 as a Delaware corporation.

In November 2023 it was announced that Avantax would be acquired by Cetera for $1.2 billion. As a result of the acquisition, the company delisted from Nasdaq and became a business unit of Cetera.
