= Oronhyatekha =

Mohawk physician and scholar

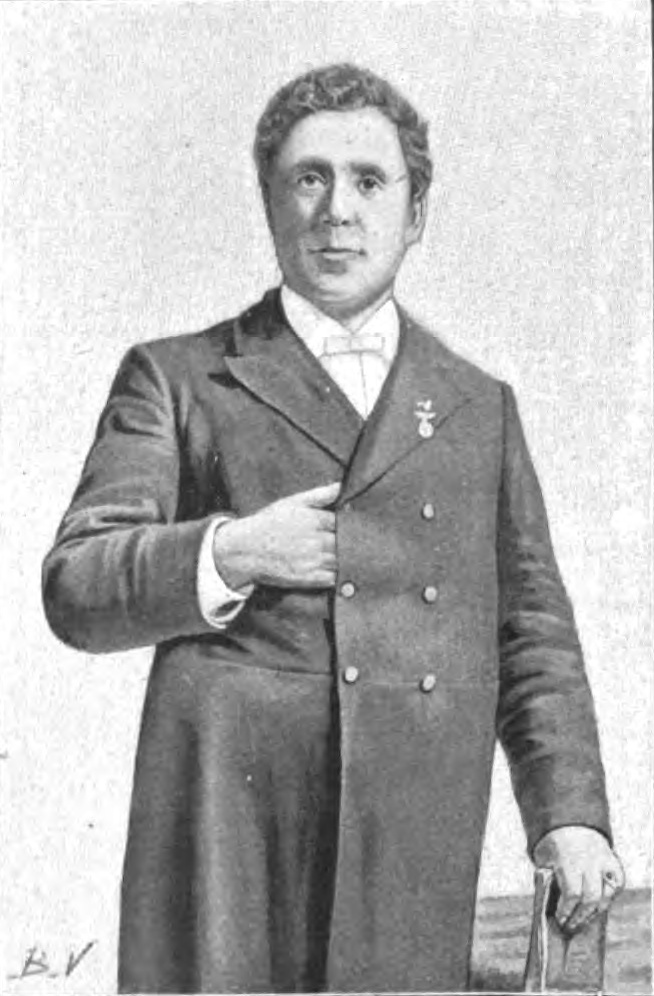
- Engraved portrait of Oronhyatekha published in Le Tour du monde, c. 19th century
- Born: Peter Martin; 10 August 1841; Six Nations of the Grand River, Canada West (now Ontario)
- Died: 3 March 1907 (aged 65); Savannah, Georgia, United States
- Other name: Oronhyatekha ("Burning Sky" or "Burning Cloud")
- Education: Wilbraham Wesleyan Academy; Kenyon College; St Edmund Hall, Oxford; University of Toronto Faculty of Medicine (MD, 1866)
- Occupations: physician; scholar; fraternal leader
- Known for: Early Indigenous physician in Canada; First known Indigenous student at University of Oxford; Supreme Chief Ranger of the Independent Order of Foresters
- Spouse: Ellen Hill (Karakwineh)
- Children: 6
- Medical career
- Field: Medicine
- Institutions: Medical practice in Frankford, Ontario; Consulting physician to the Tyendinaga Mohawk Territory

Oronhyatekha ("Burning Sky" or "Burning Cloud" in the Mohawk language, also carried the baptismal name Peter Martin; 10 August 1841 – 3 March 1907) was a Mohawk physician, scholar, and a unique figure in the history of British colonialism. He was the first known Indigenous scholar at Oxford University and earned his Doctor of Medicine degree in 1866 from the University of Toronto. He later served for twenty-six years as Supreme Chief Ranger of the Independent Order of Foresters, overseeing its expansion into a major international fraternal financial institution and the construction of Toronto’s Foresters’ Temple. He also founded a museum and an orphanage in Ontario and was active in Indigenous governance and national athletics.

== Early life and education ==
Born 10 August 1841 on the Six Nations of the Grand River near Brantford, Ontario, he was the sixth son of Peter Martin and Lydia Loft (from Tyendinaga).

He later attended the Wilbraham Wesleyan Academy in Wilbraham, Massachusetts. After graduating, he taught for a year among the Indians and then entered Kenyon College in Ohio for three years.

=== Medical training and missionary oversight ===
Oronhyatekha's early education was never intended to prepare him for a career in medicine. As a boy, he attended the Mohawk Institute, an Anglican residential school run by the New England Company, a British missionary organization based in London, England.

The Institute's mandate was vocational and evangelical. Boys were trained in manual trades and Christian discipline, and Oronhyatekha's assigned trade was shoemaking. The school's stated aim was to produce Christian, industrious, "civilized" Indigenous young men who could support themselves economically and serve as visible examples of missionary success.

At the Institute, he came under the authority of Reverend Abraham Nelles, an Anglican missionary with influence over funding and recommendations for further study. Advancement beyond the Institute required continued missionary endorsement, including letters of support and financial sponsorship.

=== The Oxford incident ===
In 1860, Oronhyatekha was chosen by Six Nations leaders to deliver a welcoming address to the Prince of Wales during the prince’s North American tour. At that event, he met Henry Wentworth Acland, a senior Oxford physician who encouraged him to pursue further education in England.

With Acland’s backing, Oronhyatekha enrolled at St Edmund Hall, Oxford, in May 1862. He became the first known Indigenous student to study at Oxford.

Within weeks, Reverend Nelles raised concerns about Oronhyatekha's character and conduct. Indigenous students in this period remained subject to close supervision, and allegations could jeopardize funding and academic standing. Although the specific nature of the concerns is not known, they were serious enough that Oronhyatekha left Oxford after only one month. He returned to Canada in 1862 and never went back.

=== Medical education and early career ===
After returning to Canada, Oronhyatekha enrolled in the Toronto School of Medicine in 1863. He received his Bachelor of Medicine degree in 1865 and his Doctor of Medicine degree in 1866 from the University of Toronto Faculty of Medicine. He was licensed to practice medicine on 22 May 1867.

He was long believed to be the first Indigenous person in Canada to earn an MD. Later documentation established that Peter Edmund Jones (Ojibwa) of New Credit First Nation graduated several months earlier in 1866.

Oronhyatekha first settled in Frankford (near Tyendinaga Mohawk Territory) in Hastings County, Ontario, where he advertised in local newspapers as an Oxford-trained physician. His advertisements also referred to "Indian cures and herbal medicines," and he developed what contemporaries described as a "booming practice" among Mohawk patients.

By 1870, he had been elected first secretary of the Hastings County Medical Association.

=== Government appointments and financial strain ===
With support from Prime Minister John A. Macdonald, Oronhyatekha was appointed as consulting physician to the Mohawks at Tyendinaga Mohawk Territory. The position carried an annual salary of $500. Government medical appointments in Indigenous communities were salaried and formed part of a broader system of contract medicine that differed from private urban practice, where he might have earned more. Such posts were subject to oversight from the Department of Indian Affairs (Canada), which regulated both reporting and expenditures.

In addition to his government work, he invested in property and commercial ventures, including a general store at Mill Point (Deseronto). When the business failed, he was forced to declare bankruptcy.

He also served as physician to the Oneida of the Thames. By 1874, he relocated to London, Ontario, where he reopened a private practice and continued to advertise his Oxford training and government experience. As his involvement with the Independent Order of Foresters expanded, he gradually reduced full-time clinical practice while retaining the title of chief medical examiner within the organization.

== Early career and public life ==
=== Military service ===
In 1866, Oronhyatekha served in the Queen's Own Rifles during the Battle of Ridgeway, one of the armed conflicts of the Fenian Raids from the US of that year.

=== Medical career and early public life ===
After graduation, Oronhyatekha practiced at Frankford, Stratford, Napanee, Buffalo, New York, and London, Ontario. As his medical practice grew, he also became a figure of increasing importance in Victorian Canada. In 1871, he became a member of the Canadian National Rifle Team which competed at Wimbledon.

In 1874, he was elected the President of the Grand Council of Indian Chiefs, a provincial organization largely made up of Anishinabe and Iroquoian communities in southwestern Ontario.

=== Fraternal and Masonic affiliations ===
Oronhyatekha was an active Orangeman and served as County Grand Master of Middlesex Country Orange Lodge. Oronhyatekha also belonged to the International Order of Good Templars, several branches of the Masonic Order, the Ancient Order of United Workmen, the Knights of the Maccabees, and the Orange Order. He was the Worshipful Master of Richardson Masonic Lodge in Stouffville, Ontario in 1894.

== Independent Order of Foresters ==
=== Membership and rise to leadership ===
In 1878, while living in London, Oronhyatekha applied to become a member of the Independent Order of Foresters, a fraternal and financial institution that combined mutual aid, life insurance, and social fellowship, typical of nineteenth-century voluntary associations.

During this period, the Foresters' statutes explicitly limited its membership to white men and Orangemen, but Oronhyatekha was an Orangeman and he was granted entry.

By 1881, he had become Supreme Chief Ranger of Foresters, the highest executive role within the order, responsible for overseeing its administration, finances, and international expansion. He held for a record 27 years. In 1889, he moved to Toronto, where the headquarters had relocated.

Under his leadership, Oronhyatekha transformed the order into one of the wealthiest fraternal financial institutions in the Victorian world; today, it counts more than 2.8 million members in North America and the European Union.

=== Foresters' Temple and museum ===
While heading the Foresters, he built one of the first North American museums created by a Native individual. It was housed in the Foresters' Temple, which once stood at the corner of Bay and Richmond in Toronto, until shortly after his death. It contained natural history artifacts, items from Canadian Native groups, and from cultures around the world. The artifacts were transferred to the Royal Ontario Museum in 1911. For its time, the Temple was the tallest office building in the British empire and incorporated the latest technology, such as electric elevators and lights, both of which were powered by an electrical plant in the basement; a chilled drinking water system; and extensive fireproofing. The Temple also featured many amenities for its staff, including its own newsstand, cafe and dining room, smoking room, meeting rooms, and bicycle storage.

=== Foresters' Island ===
In the 1890s, Oronhyatekha purchased an island from his wife's family in the Bay of Quinte, across from Deseronto, which he renamed as Foresters' Island. Here, he built a second family residence known as "The Wigwam," a meeting and dining hall, a bandstand, the Isle Hotel and cottages for guests, and a wharf at which boats from the mainland could dock. While the hotel seems to have been open for all guests, not just members, Martin hosted huge gatherings each summer to celebrate Foresters anniversaries and events.

=== Orphanage ===
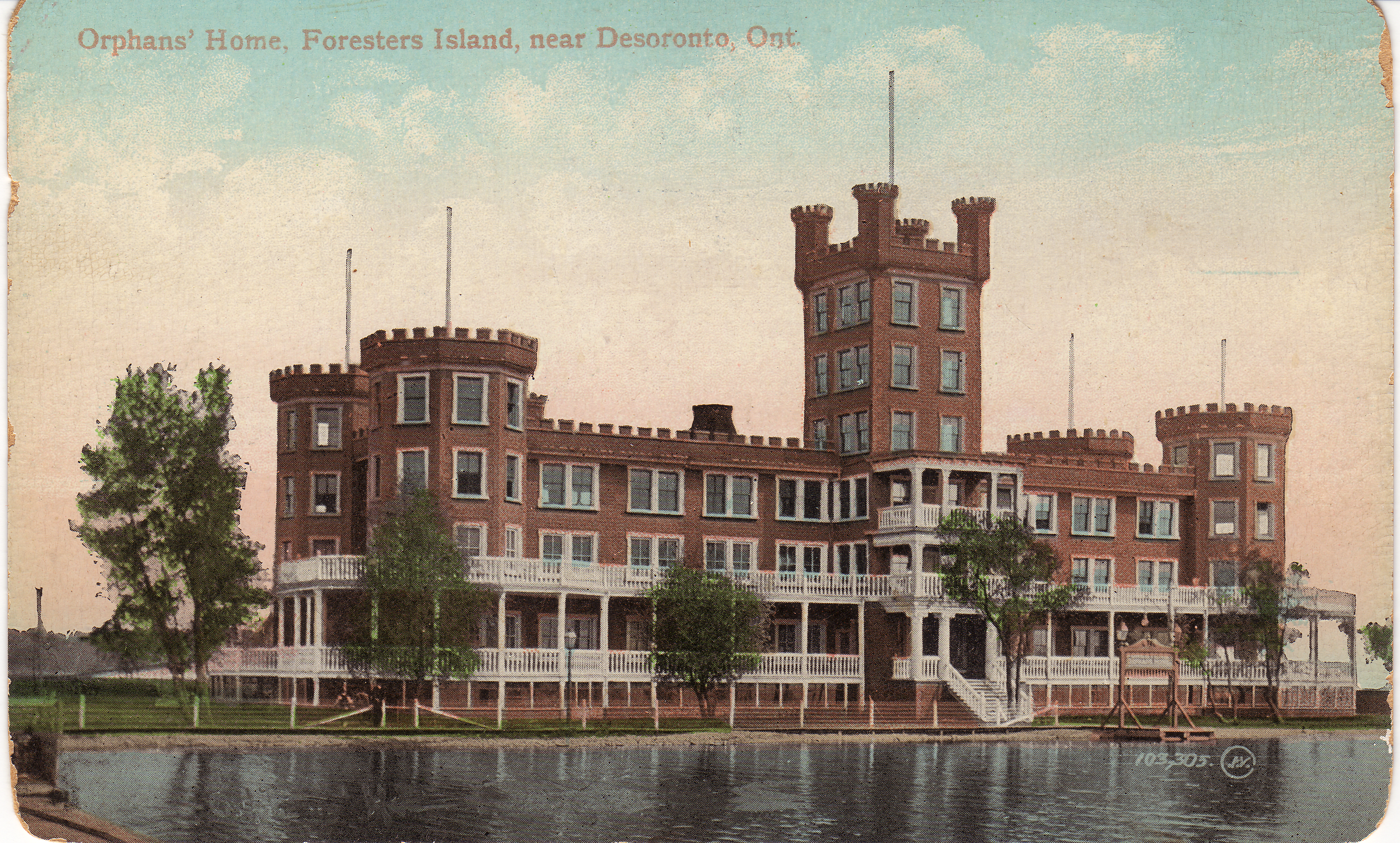
Colour postcard of "Orphans' Home, Foresters Island near Deseronto, Ont.", published by Valentine & Sons Co. Ltd.

Oronhyatekha was most proud of an orphanage he established in 1904 on the Bay of Quinte, Ontario. It opened for operations in 1906, and Oronhyatekha described it as his life's crowning achievement. But he died the next year, and the orphanage was sold in 1908.

== Personal life and children ==
On 28 August 1863, Oronhyatekha married Ellen Hill, a Mohawk from Tyendinaga Reserve. She was also known by her Mohawk name Karakwineh, meaning "moving sun".

The marriage took place shortly after his return from England and before he began his formal medical training in Toronto.

The couple had six children together, though only two survived to adulthood. Three of their children died very early. Their son Henry drowned at the age of 10 during the sinking of the Victoria on the Thames River in London, Ontario, on Victoria Day in 1881.

Their eldest child, Catherine, married Percy John Johnson, an Australian. Their son Acland Martin followed his father into the medical profession and became a physician. Acland married twice but had no children. He died young in 1907, only a few months after his father.

Oronhyatekha died on 3 March 1907 at the age of 65. His death occurred shortly after the opening of the orphanage he had established on the Bay of Quinte, an institution he described as his life's greatest achievement.

== Legacy and honors ==
=== National recognition ===
In 2001, Oronhyatekha was designated a Person of National Historic Significance by Parks Canada under the Historic Sites and Monuments Act. A commemorative plaque was erected at Tyendinaga Mohawk Territory near his burial site in recognition of his contributions as a physician, fraternal leader, and philanthropist.

=== Municipal and heritage recognition ===
A plaque commemorating Oronhyatekha was installed by the former Toronto Historical Board in Allan Gardens in the Cabbagetown neighbourhood, where he had lived while in Toronto.

His residence at 209 Carlton Street is listed in the Cabbagetown Heritage Conservation District and appears in the City of Toronto's heritage inventory.

His former residence in London, Ontario, located at 172 Central Avenue (formerly Litchfield Avenue), has been identified in the City of London's Register of Cultural Heritage Resources.

=== Sculpture ===
A sculpture of Oronhyatekha by Canadian sculptor Walter Seymour Allward is displayed at the headquarters of the Independent Order of Foresters at 789 Don Mills Road in Toronto.

=== Museum and exhibition ===
In 2002, the Royal Ontario Museum and the Woodland Cultural Centre jointly curated the exhibition Mohawk Ideals, Victorian Values: Oronhyatekha, M.D., which featured objects from the museum collection he established at the Foresters' Temple in Toronto.

=== Scholarly recognition ===
A full-length biography, Dr. Oronhyatekha: Security, Justice, and Equality, co-authored by Keith Jamieson and Michelle A. Hamilton, was published by Dundurn Press in 2016. The biography received the Ontario Historical Society's Joseph Brant Award in 2017.

=== Hall of Honour ===
In 2007, Oronhyatekha was inducted into the Loyal Americans Hall of Honour (Bay of Quinte Branch) by the United Empire Loyalists' Association of Canada.
