= Order of Scottish Clans =

American fraternal and benevolent society

- Formation: November 30, 1878
- Founder: James McCash, Dougal Crawford, John Beattie, John Bruce, John D. Cruickshank, George Bain, Robert R. Scott, William Morrison, Peter C. Peterkin, Neil Stewart
- Founded at: St. Louis, Missouri
- Dissolved: 1971
- Merger of: Independent Order of Foresters
- Type: Fraternal and benevolent society
- Headquarters: Boston
- Members: 16,000 (1971)
- Subsidiaries: Daughters of Scotia (female auxiliary)

The Order of Scottish Clans was a fraternal and benevolent society The dual purpose of the Order was to provide life and disability insurance to Scottish immigrants and their descendants, and also to preserve the culture and traditions of Scotland among Americans of Scottish ancestry.

== History ==
There were a number of Scottish organizations in the US and Canada in the 1870s, whose activities included holding games and entertainments dedicated to preserving Scots heritage. However, none of the existing groups provided sickness or death benefits. To fill this void the Order of Scottish Clans was founded in St. Louis, Missouri, on November 30, 1878. Its founders included James McCash, Dougal Crawford, John Beattie, John Bruce, John D. Cruickshank, George Bain, Robert R. Scott, William Morrison, Peter C. Peterkin and Neil Stewart. Most of the members were Masons and "high in its councils".

The group experienced financial insolvency in the state of Missouri, where it was incorporated in the 1920s, but later rebounded. In 1971 the Order of Scottish Clans was subsumed into the Independent Order of Foresters.

== Membership ==
Membership was open to Scotsmen, their sons or male descendants, ages 18 to 50, who were of good moral character and possessed a reputable means of support. There were 4,000 members in 1897. At the time of its merger with the Independent Order of Foresters it had 16,000 members.

== Organization ==
The Order had a three tier structure. Local units were called "Subordinate Clans", state or provincial groups were "Grand Clans" and the biennial "Royal Clan" was the highest authority. In 1897 there were 96 Clans, 89 in the United States and 7 in Canada. Each branch, of the Order, chose a clan association, often by who was in the area. For example, Clan MacKenzie #27, was in Manchester, New Hampshire, until the amalgamation with the Foresters.

The groups headquarters was in Boston at the time of the merger with the IOF.

== Daughters of Scotia ==
The Daughters of Scotia is a female auxiliary founded in New Haven, Connecticut, in 1895 and incorporated in that state the following year. Originally the membership was made up of two men and twenty three women. When the organization was firmly established, the men withdrew.

Membership was opened to the wives, mothers, daughters, sisters, and widows of members of the Order of Scottish Clans, as well as other women of Scottish descent or adopted by the OSC or DOS. There are two classes of membership, donation (beneficiary) and social (non-beneficiary). Donation members must be between 16 and 45 and in good health, while social members were over 45 and "not physically qualified to become a donation member." Social members are entitled to all privileges of membership other than donation fund benefits. All of its members in Canada were social members.

The donation fund was not a typical insurance fund, but was a death benefit paid by assessing each member a nominal fee. The Daughters had a ritual, which included an initiation ceremony.

In 1979 the local units were called "Clans", but they now appear to be called "Lodges". The national structure is called a Grand Lodge and meets in convention annually. In 1979 its "secretarial offices" were in Troy, Michigan, and the Daughters had 17,000 members.
