= Foresters House =

Office building in North York, Ontario, Canada

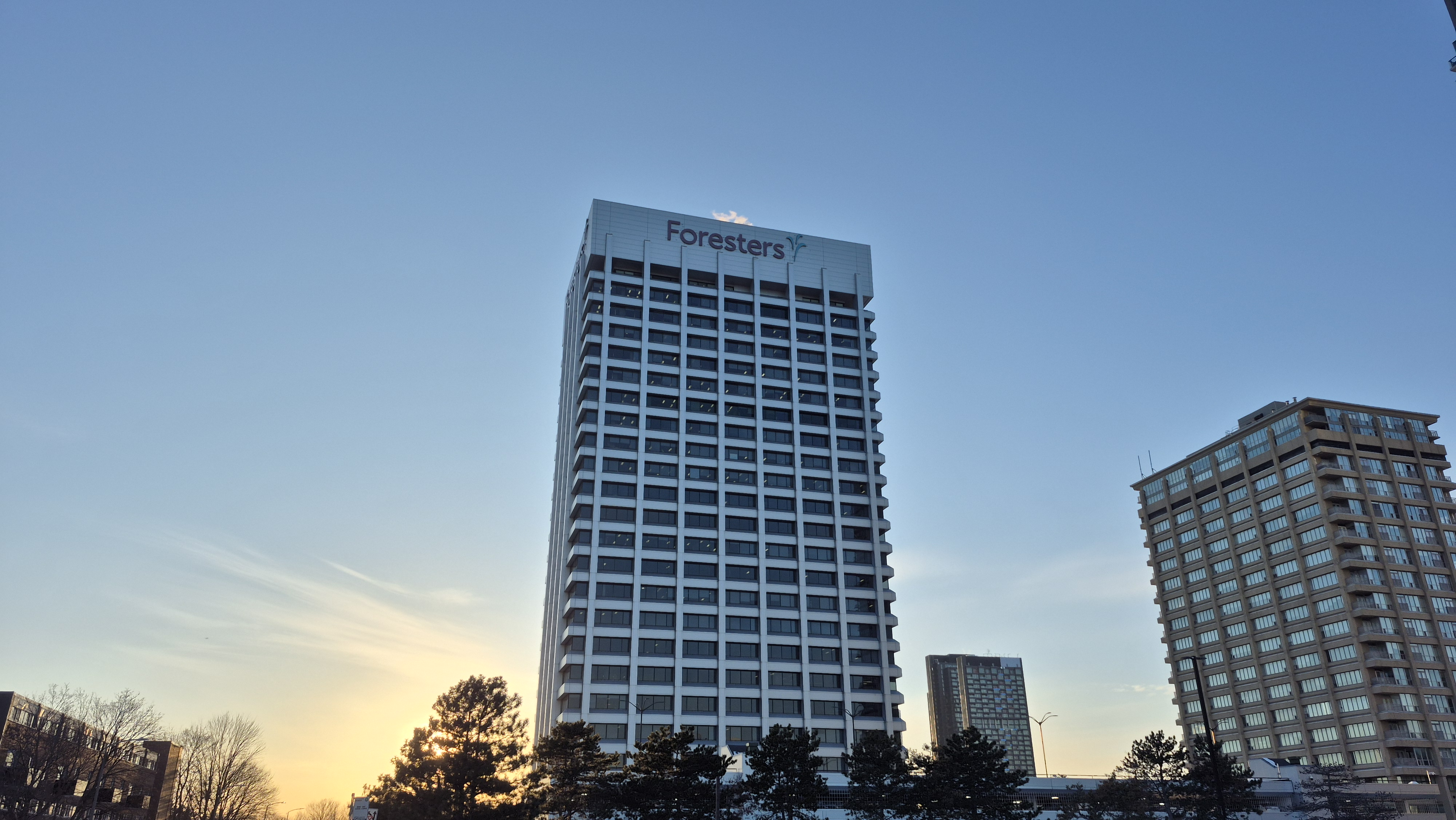
- Foresters House building in 2026
- Interactive map of the Foresters House area

General information
- Status: Completed
- Location: 789 Don Mills Road, Toronto, Ontario, Canada, Toronto, Canada
- Coordinates: 43.7187°N 79.3375°W
- Completed: 1966
- Opened: 1967
- Owner: Foresters Financial
- Landlord: Menkes Developments Ltd.

Technical details
- Floor count: 23

Design and construction
- Architect: Bregman + Hamann Architects
- Developer: Olympia & York Developments

Website
- https://www.foresters.com/

Foresters House (789 Don Mills Road) is an office building in North York, Ontario at the intersection of Don Mills Road and Eglinton Avenue. At 95m (314ft), it serves as the headquarters of Foresters Financial.

== History and architecture ==
Foresters Financial, is a fraternal benefit society headquartered in Toronto, Ontario, Canada, that provides life insurance and other financial solutions in Canada, the United Kingdom, and the United States. As of 2024, Matt Berman has served as the company's president and CEO. In 1965, construction began on their corporate headquarters.

Designed by Kaljo Voore, an Estonian Canadian architect, of Bregman and Hamman with Craig, Zeidler & Strong, the building consists of two buildings, accessed from a raised plaza, with a double-story, fully-glazed ground floor along with a sunken, out-door garden with a sloping lawn. Located next to it was a smaller building known as the North American Life Tower. It was converted to a residential building in 2001 and is now known as Tribeca Lofts.

In 2022, Foresters sold the building to Menkes Development, who plans to develop new towers behind the building in a vacant parking lot. An intention to designate the property a heritage site was adopted in April 2023.

== Tenants ==
- Foresters Financial
- Menkes Development
- RoxvilleTechnology Inc.
- SICON CRM inc.
- EPiQVision Inc.
- Winchester Development Ltd.
- Metro College of Technology
- Consulate General of Romania in Toronto
- Pamir Academy
- Link Charity Canada Inc.
- 01 Quantum Inc.
- Alborz Venture Capital
- Atlantic724 Immigration Inc.
- MAXIMUS Canada Services Inc.
- Royal York Poperty Management
- Richelieu Hardwar Canada Ltd.
- MCIS Interpretation & Translation
- Trillium Guideway Partners

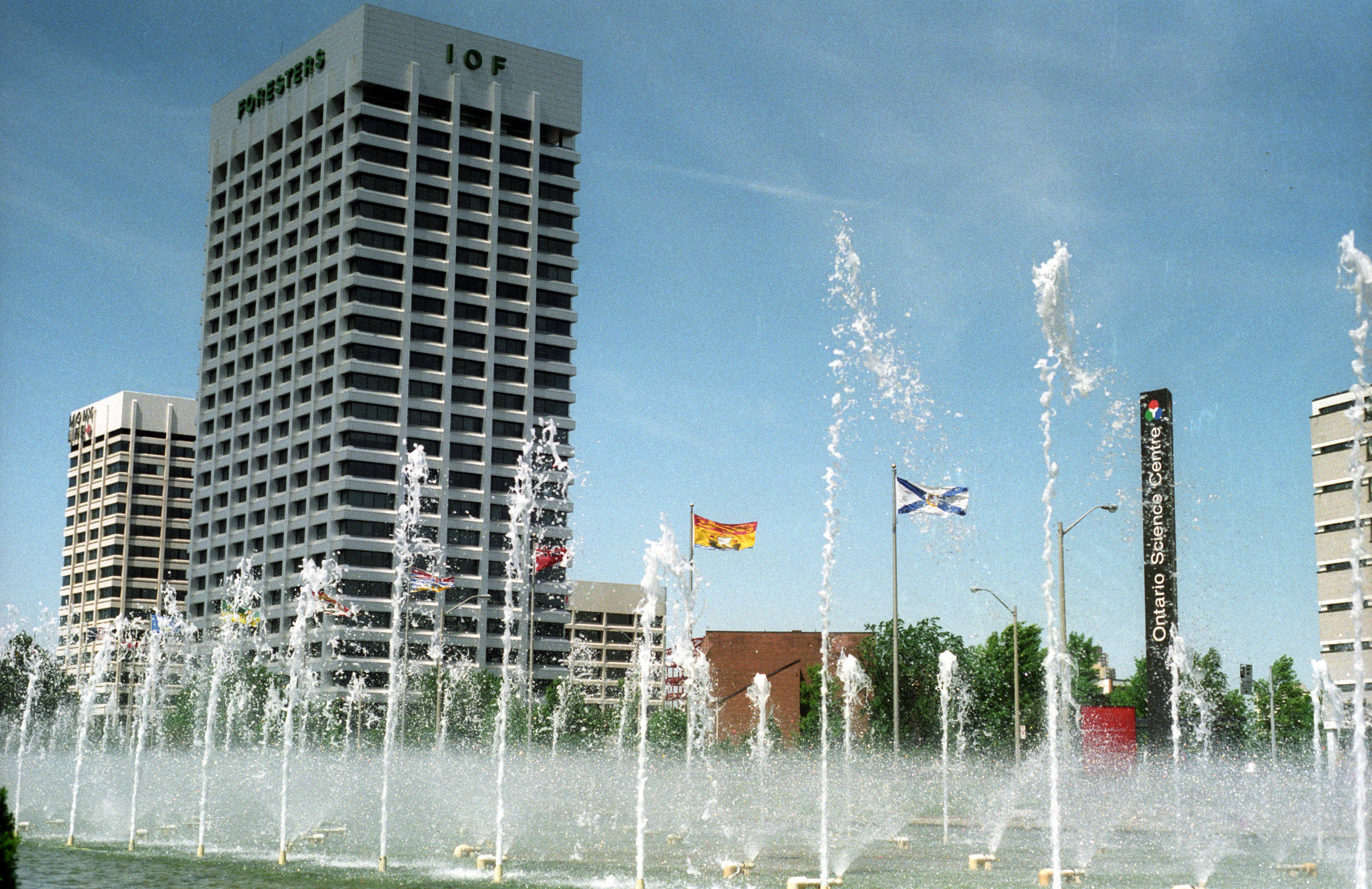
Foresters building in 1992

== Nearby landmarks ==
Nearby landmarks include the Celestica headquarters, the former Ontario Science Centre building, The Aga Khan Museum, a Real Canadian Superstore, and a Church of Jesus Christ of Latter-day Saints meetinghouse. The building is also connected with transit through Line 5 Eglinton and the future Ontario Line.

== See also ==
- Foresters Financial
- Ontario Science Centre
