= Vimy =

- Commune
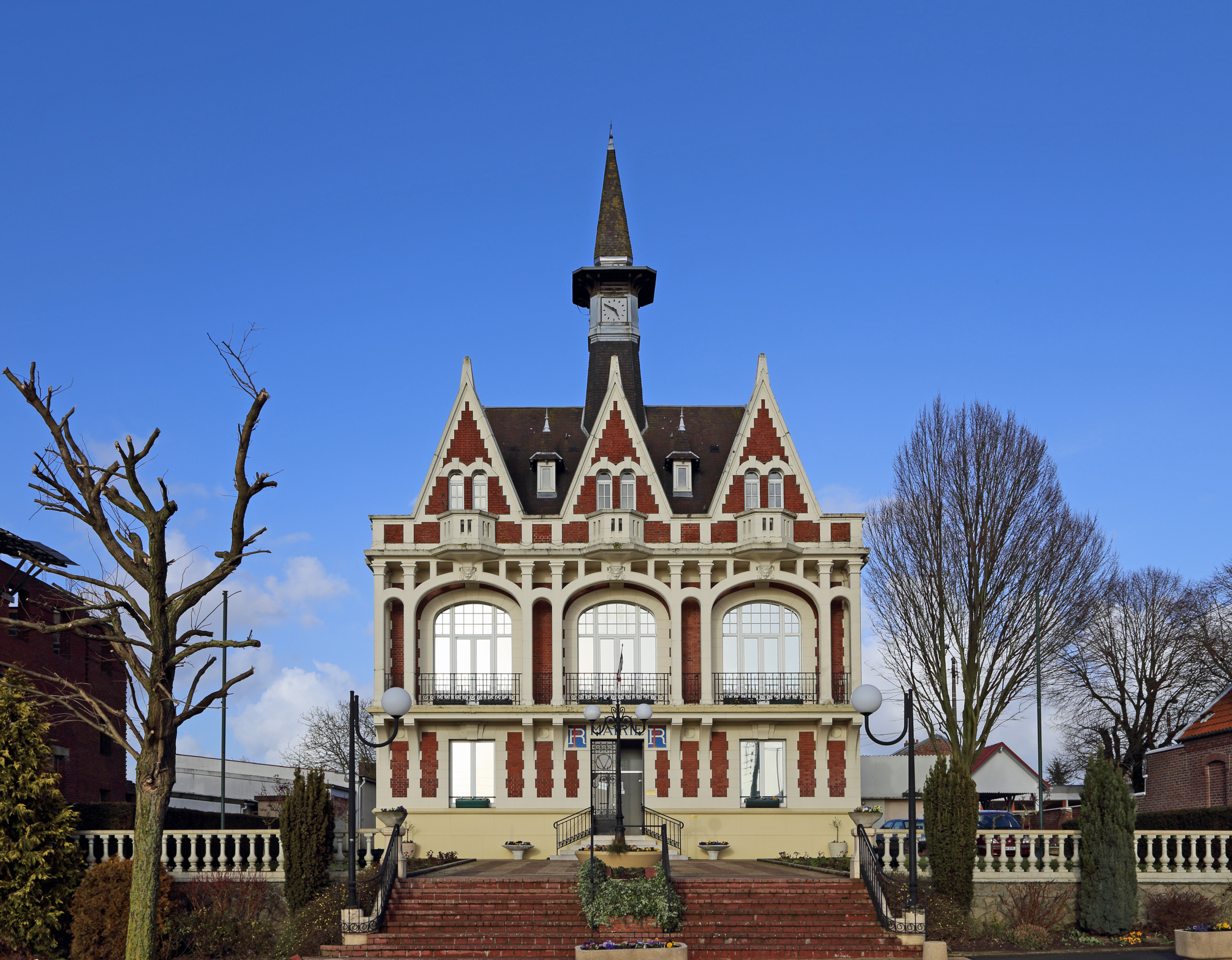
- Vimy city hall

- Coat of arms
- Location of Vimy
- Location within France Location within Hauts-de-France
- Coordinates: 50°22′24″N 2°48′41″E
- Country: France
- Region: Hauts-de-France
- Department: Pas-de-Calais
- Arrondissement: Lens
- Canton: Liévin
- Intercommunality: CA Lens-Liévin

Government
  - Mayor (2021–2026): Christian Sprimont
- Area^{1}: 11.33 km^{2} (4.37 sq mi)
- Elevation: 71 m (233 ft)
- Highest elevation: 146 m (479 ft)
- Lowest elevation: 49 m (161 ft)
- Population (2023): 4,270
  - Density: 377/km^{2} (976/sq mi)
- Time zone: UTC+01:00 (CET)
  - Summer (DST): UTC+02:00 (CEST)
- INSEE/Postal code: 62861 /62580
- ^{1} French Land Register data, which excludes lakes, ponds, glaciers > 1 km^{2} (0.386 sq mi or 247 acres) and river estuaries.

Vimy (Wimi; /ˈviːmi/ or /ˈvɪmi/; French pronunciation: [vimi]) is a commune in the French department of Pas-de-Calais. Located 3.8 kilometers (2.4 mi) west of Vimy is the Canadian National Vimy Memorial dedicated to the Battle of Vimy Ridge and the Canadian soldiers who were killed during the First World War. The Memorial is also the site of two Canadian cemeteries.

== Geography and history ==
Vimy is a farming town, situated some 10 kilometers (6 miles) north of Arras, at the junction of the D51 and the N17 roads. It is situated on the crest of Vimy Ridge, a prominent feature overlooking the Artois region.

The town was first mentioned in 1183 as Viniarcum and was the scene of much fighting during the fourteenth, seventeenth and eighteenth centuries among the French, English, Dutch and Spanish forces.

The ridge was the scene of fierce fighting in the First World War. Seized by the Germans in 1914, it was the subject of a French assault in 1915. In 1917 the Battle of Vimy Ridge took place southeast of Vimy and the town was practically destroyed during the fighting in the area.

== Places of interest ==
=== Canadian National Vimy Memorial Park ===
Canadian National Vimy Memorial designed by Walter Seymour Allward

Set on the highest point of Vimy Ridge, the Canadian National Vimy Memorial is the largest of Canada's war monuments. In 1922, use of the land for the battlefield park which contains the memorial was granted, in perpetuity, by the French nation to the people of Canada in recognition of Canada's war efforts. A portion of the former Vimy Ridge battlefield, amounting to 100 hectares (250 acres), is preserved as part of the memorial park which surrounds the monument. The grounds of the site are still honeycombed with wartime tunnels, trenches and craters, closed off for public safety.

The project took designer Walter Seymour Allward 11 years to see built. (The total cost was $1.5 million, which is over $20 million in present terms.) King Edward VIII unveiled it on 26 July 1936 in the presence of French President Albert Lebrun and a crowd of over 50,000 including over 6200 Canadian veterans and their families.

Following an extensive multi-year restoration, Queen Elizabeth II re-dedicated the monument on 9 April 2007 at a ceremony commemorating the 90th anniversary of the battle. A new $10 million visitor center was completed before the 9 April 2017 commemoration of the 100th anniversary of the battle. The event was anticipated to be attended by as many as 30,000 people. The official ceremony included comments by Canadian Prime Minister Justin Trudeau, Governor General David Johnston as representative of the Monarchy of Canada, Prince Charles as representative of the Monarchy of the United Kingdom, Prince William, Duke of Cambridge, Prince Harry, the President of France François Hollande, and the Prime Minister of France Bernard Cazeneuve.

=== Town of Vimy ===
The territory of the commune or local authority of Vimy is urban. It had 4,265 inhabitants in 2017. Historic sites within its boundaries include:

- The church of St. Martin, rebuilt, along with much of the village, after World War I
- The remains of a thirteenth-century castle, destroyed in 1833, now the site of the current town hall

== Population ==
Historical population
Year	Pop.	±% p.a.
1968	3,272	—
1975	3,316	+0.19%
1982	3,621	+1.26%
1990	4,581	+2.98%
1999	4,675	+0.23%
2007	4,468	−0.56%
2012	4,252	−0.99%
2017	4,265	+0.06%
2023	4,270	+0.02%
Source: INSEE

== Twin towns ==
- Horley in Surrey, England.
- Fischach in Bavaria, Germany.

== See also ==
- Communes of the Pas-de-Calais department
