= The Stone Carvers =

2001 novel by Jane Urquhart

- First edition cover
- Author: Jane Urquhart
- Language: English
- Subject: World War I
- Genre: Fiction, Historical Fiction
- Publisher: McClelland and Stewart
- Publication date: 2001
- Publication place: Canada
- Media type: Print
- Awards: Finalist for Giller Prize
- ISBN: 0670030449
- OCLC: 48710917

The Stone Carvers (2001) is a novel by the Canadian writer Jane Urquhart, focusing on the historical events of World War I, and the fictional town of Shoneval, Ontario.

The novel follows three generations of a Canadian family, starting in 19th century Ontario with a Bavarian wood carver and an immigrant German priest on a mission to found a church in an isolated town. However, the story centres around the lives of the wood carver's grandchildren in the 1900s; thus exploring the devastation of World War I, the building of the Vimy Memorial in France, and what Urquart calls "the redemptive nature of making art."

== Plot summary ==
Beginning with the woodcarver Joseph Becker, the novel's timeline shifts back and forth between his life in 19th century Ontario, and the pre- and post-war lives of the grandchildren Klara and Tilman. Told in three parts, The Stone Carvers starts within Canada, moving to France as the characters negotiate their grief, and explore the human need to live, remember and memorialize.

=== The Needle and the Chisel ===
In the mid-19th century, Father Gstir is sent from Bavaria to Canada to minister to German-Catholic communities. He is drawn to Shoneval, a farming town situated in a valley in Ontario, and is determined to build a stone church with a bell. Joseph Becker, a master woodcarver, helps him.

Shifting to the 1930s, Klara is introduced as a middle-aged spinster alone in Shovenal. However, the narrative then rewinds to when Klara and her brother Tilman were children. Here we learn that they are the grandchildren of Becker who tries to pass on his carving skills to his grandson. However, the boy is reluctant and unenthusiastic; suffering from wanderlust, Tilman is unable to stay in the same spot for long, and often runs away from the small town. When Tilman reaches 12, his mother is overcome with the stress of losing her child over and over again, resulting in the use of some unorthodox ways to keep him to Shoneval, including literally tying him down. However, unable to be kept in one place, Tilman leaves for good. By contrast, Klara is eager to learn the carving trade and Becker teaches her while her mother passes on her skills of needlework.

In her youth, Klara falls in love with the silent son of an Irish family, Eamon O'Sullivan. Eamon does not stay in her life for long, as he leaves to fight in World War I with plans to fly an airplane and come back a hero. After he is reported as missing in action, Klara is devastated and attempts to shut out her memory of him and her emotions, and the narrative returns to her life as the spinster.

=== The Road ===
After leaving home, Tilman spends several years as a hobo on the roads and rails. He eventually meets up with a tramp named Refuto, who had left home because he felt guilty for indirectly killing his brother. Later, Refuto decides to try returning home, fearful that his family will not forgive his wrongs. Refuto brings Tilman with him to the Italian district of Hamilton; Tilman befriends Refuto's son Giorgio and lives with the family for a time, doing the odd job in this steel town. But when war comes, Tilman serves in the trenches of France.

=== The Monument ===
Aged in his 40s, Tilman returns to Shoneval, and Klara is reunited with the brother who had been assumed dead years ago. Here it is learned that Tilman is a veteran of the Great War, and lost his leg in the battle of Vimy Ridge and walks with a prosthetic.

Upon learning of the construction of the Vimy memorial, the elaborate monument dedicated to the lost soldiers without a known grave, Klara becomes determined to travel to France with Tilman to work on it. After overcoming her brother's reluctance they travel to France and start work on the monument, Klara disguised as a man. After some weeks, and without permission, Klara sculpts Eamon's face on a key statue on the memorial, the torchbearer, symbolizing all of the young men who lost their lives. Despite his initial anger, the designer, Walter Allward, sees amazing carving skills within Klara, and how the portrait of the young man's face increases the much desired allegory for those youthful men who were lost in the war. Ultimately deciding it enhances the monument, Allward keeps the alteration.

While working alongside Tilman's friend Giorgio, Klara falls in love with him, and for the first time since Eamon's death she opens up her emotions. Tilman also opens himself up to physical intimacy for the first time, with a male war-wounded French chef. Both Tilman and the chef, Recouvrir, find love and healing in each other's damaged bodies.

The novel ends with the imposing memorial completed, Allward all but forgotten, and Klara and Tilman now leading emotionally fulfilling lives with their partners in Canada, having memorialized the people they knew who had been taken by the war. The concluding statements of the novel tie together all of the story lines, revealing the vast experiences of the creation of the nation of Canada.

== Analysis ==
Memory and history are the big players within The Stone Carvers. The building of the Vimy Memorial is mirrored in the construction of Father Gstir's church in Shoneval, and the castle of Bavarian King Ludwig II; thus "de-centring" the dominant history of the great victory of Vimy Ridge, and exhibiting the equivalence that these stories play in generating Canadian identity. This, along with the use of many character's various experiences with Vimy Ridge and World War I, Urquhart articulates the idea of memory and history being a "process" where "the meanings of past events continue to change as time progresses." Critics often use the term post-memory within analysis of The Stone Carvers. This term is coined by Marianne Hirsh, explained as a relationship between generations where the later generation is "transmitted" memories from the previous generation by way of stories, etcetera; however, these memories resonate deeply within the subsequent generation so that they feel like they have experienced it themselves. Post-memory within The Stone Carvers is evident from the very beginning as Urquhart outlines "The nuns and the one spinster clung to the story, as if by telling the tale they became witnesses, perhaps even participants" in the creation of Shovenal.

Another theme that is common within The Stone Carvers is obsession. Urquhart uses Father Gstir's obsession for his church bell, Allward's obsession with stone, Eamon's obsession to fly, to represent how over time there are similarities in the different experiences that created the "events and processes of Canadian history."

== References to actual history and geography ==
Walter Allward and the memorial on Vimy Ridge are historical facts; however, the novel's detailed depiction of him is fictional.

The background story of Father Gstir and the church construction is loosely based on the construction of the church in Formosa, Ontario.

== Awards and nominations ==
The Stone Carvers was a finalist for the Governor General's Award and the Giller Prize, and longlisted for the Booker Prize.
