= The Whirlpool (Urquhart novel) =

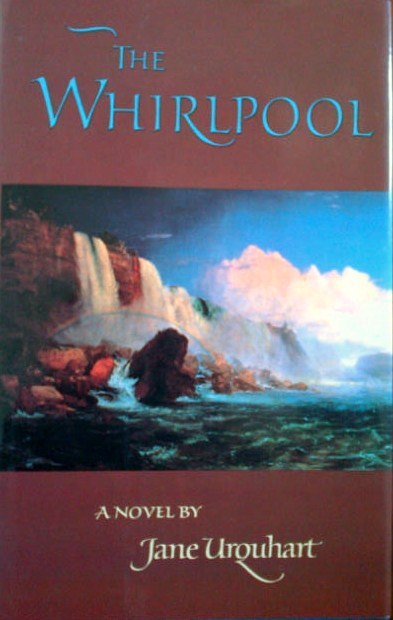
- Original Cover Design
- Author: Jane Urquhart
- Language: English
- Genre: Historical fiction
- Publisher: McClelland & Stewart
- Publication date: 1986
- Publication place: Canada
- Pages: 237
- Awards: Prix du Meilleur livre etranger
- ISBN: 0-7710-8655-5

The Whirlpool, originally published in Toronto by McClelland and Stewart in 1986, is Canadian author Jane Urquhart's first novel. It was subsequently published in the United Kingdom by Simon and Schuster, in the US by David R. Godine, and in translation in France (under the title Niagara) by Maurice Nadeau. It was the first Canadian novel to be awarded France's Prix du Meilleur Livre Étranger in 1992, and was afterward published in several other European countries.

== Plot ==
The novel is set in Niagara Falls in the summer of 1889, and focuses on the lives of several characters whose numerous obsessions, “concentrated chiefly in the image of the whirlpool, draw them inexorably together.”

The story, bracketed by scenes of Robert Browning's last days in Venice, follows the lives of Patrick, a “chronically ill clerk and would-be poet"; David McDougal, an Americaphobe military historian; his eccentric wife, Fleda, who “spends her days in the woods, reading Browning's poetry”, and Maude, the widow of the undertaker with a mute four-year-old son.

Against the backdrop of a river, its whirlpool and the forest, the poet Patrick fantasizes of Fleda rather than accepting her offer of a real relationship. Fleda goes to live in the woods, rejecting social conventions of the time, while Maude renews contact with her mute son, who begins in his own way to speak.

== Characters ==
The major characters in the novel are notably quirky. The main protagonist of the story is Fleda, the dreamer, who “reads and breathes Browning's poetics, soon Patrick's as well, with a tenderness - for his reality - that he cannot countenance: "Patrick began to shake. He felt his privacy, his self, had been completely invaded - How dare she? He thought as if she, not he, had been the voyeur - She was not supposed to be aware of the lens he had fixed on her." "

Fleda's husband is Major David McDougal, a military historian, who comes to life when arguing that Canada, and not the United States, really won the War of 1812. Patrick is a poet, determined to understand Fleda and the whirlpool, both curiously and inextricably linked in his mind. Maud Grady is the undertaker's widow, who zealously records the features of unidentified corpses from the Niagara River and sees that they are properly buried.

== Major themes ==
In this novel, Urquhart uses the landscape of Niagara Falls in the 19th century to explore themes of “obsession, withdrawal and the relationship of individuals to both society and nature.”

== Style ==
Though it has a plot, The Whirlpool has a prose poem density.

Jane Urquhart's work is notable for its focus on passionate and dreamy characters haunted by lively imaginations.

== Background ==
Urquhart lost her partner, Paul Keele, in a car accident in 1973 when she was only twenty-four. Keele's death spurred Urquhart to return to school: "I wanted to study art history, partly to honour him and partly to be near a number of friends we had made while we lived in and around Guelph." The experience of loss at such a young age shaped Urquhart's writing, particularly The Whirlpool, whose protagonist, Fleda, is similarly a young widow. "I think the fact that Paul died when he did, when we were both so young, allowed me to remember what it was like to experience such a devastating loss early in life, as my characters do in this book," she explains.
