= Court Charity =

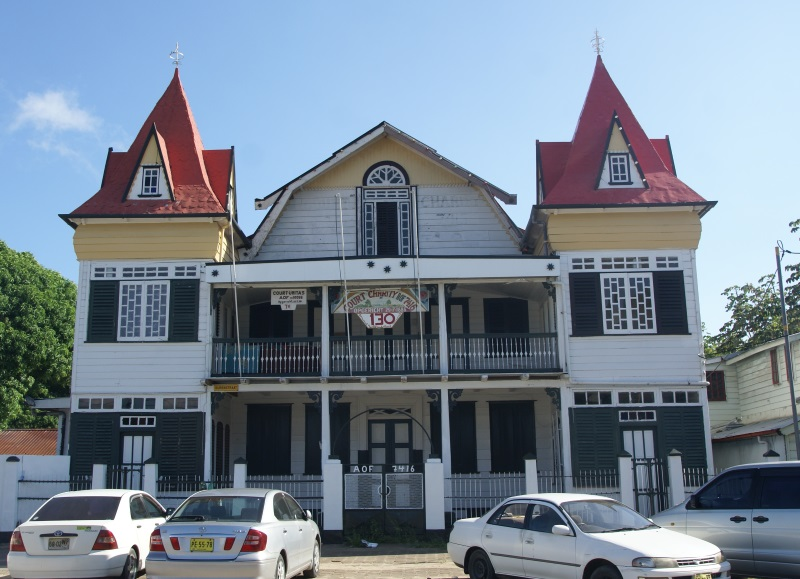

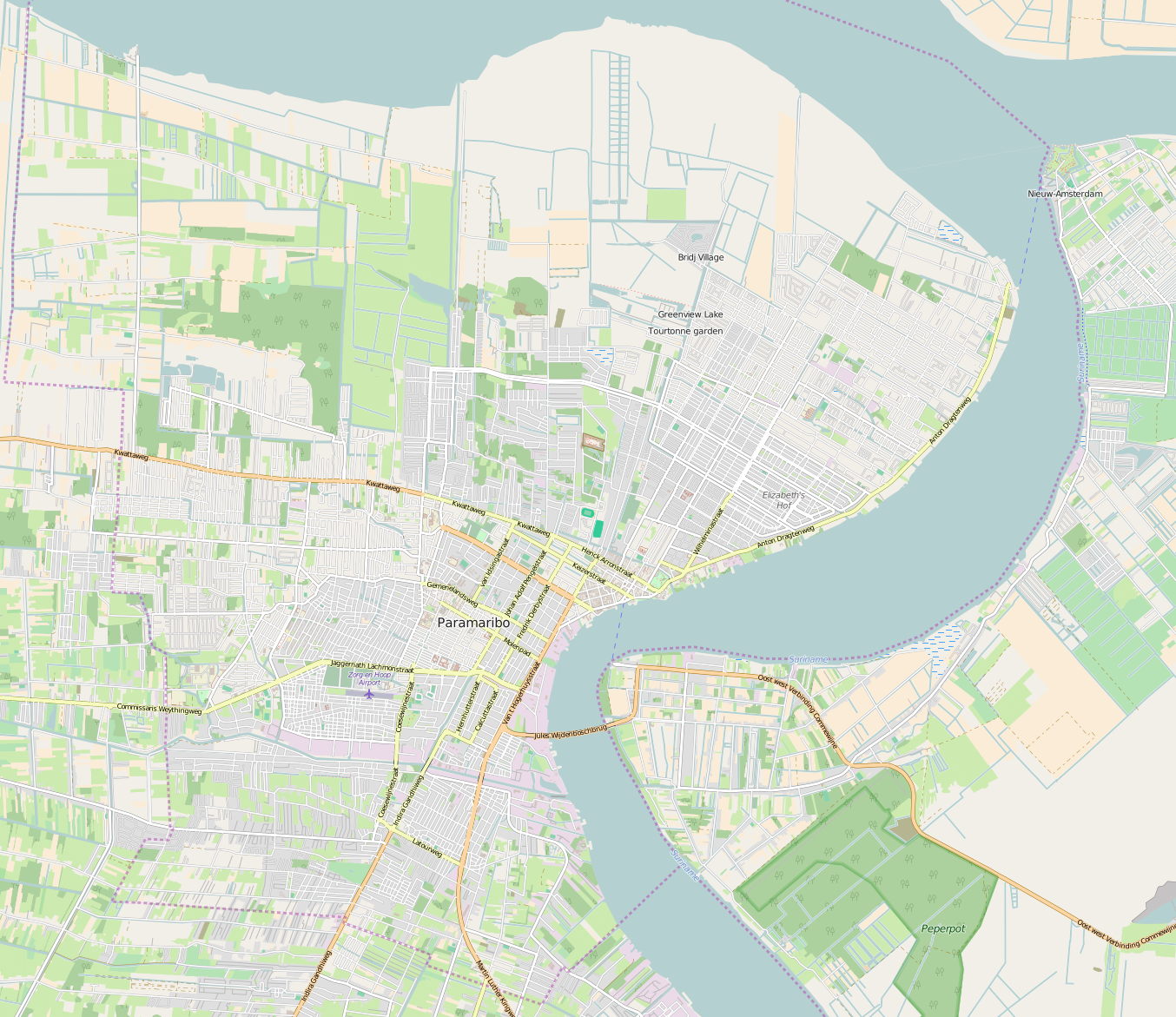
- Location within Paramaribo

General information
- Location: Paramaribo, Suriname
- Coordinates: 5.82719°N 55.16314°W
- Completed: 13 November 1909
- Client: Foresters Friendly Society

Court Charity is a friendly society of the Foresters Friendly Society. It is located on Burenstraat in the centre of Paramaribo, Suriname. The building is a monument.

== History ==
J.F. Waakhuizen became interested in the Ancient Order of Foresters in neighbouring Georgetown, British Guiana, and wanted to establish a court in Suriname. The English headquarters gave permission on 8 December 1885, and the court was inaugurated on 29 July 1886 as Court Charity no. 7416. A cacao warehouse in Burenstraat was acquired, and on 13 November 1909, the current building was inaugurated. Originally, the court was part of the Guiana United District.

== Building ==
The style of the building is atypical. There are some Surinamese elements like the galleries, but also two distinct towers and a mansard roof. The meeting room is on the top floor. On the wall there are paintings like Good Samaritan. The ceiling is vault-like and depicts a sky with moon and stars. The building was declared a monument in 1994. In 2014, it was renovated with financial aid of the Dutch embassy.

== Society ==
In 1928, the society started to grow. In 1938, Court Humanitas was founded to allow women in the society. In 1972, the Court Charity of Suriname became an independent organisation. As of 2006, the society has 1,600 members over 17 courts. The members are mainly elderly Afro-Surinamese people, and the society has difficulty attracting younger members.

A notable member was Lou Lichtveld who wrote Geschiedenis en Ontstaan der Foresterie (1952) about the history of the society using the pseudonym J.B. Tenoten (Junior Beadle of Court 10010).

== Bibliography ==
- Mulder, Jannes H. (2006). "De Ancient Order of Foresters in Suriname". OSO. Tijdschrift voor Surinaamse taalkunde, letterkunde en geschiedenis (in Dutch).
