= The Underpainter =

Novel by Jane Urquhart

The Underpainter is a novel by Jane Urquhart that won the 1997 Governor General's Award for English-language fiction, and in the same year was a finalist for the Rogers Writers' Trust Fiction Prize.

The story takes place mainly in Canada and the United States in the early years of the 20th century. The main character and narrator, Austin Fraser (the "underpainter" of the title) is a successful artist, and the plot mostly concerns his relationship with a waitress he uses as a model and how his art reflects his dislike for human contact.

Fraser meets the waitress, Sara Pengelly, when he leaves his native USA to spend the summer in Silver Islet Landing; but he declines to form a permanent attachment to her, finding her an embarrassment on the rare occasions they meet outside her normal environment. The book begins as Fraser, now an old man, hears of Sara's death. The remainder of the narrative deals with his past history.

Fraser's only real friend, George Kearns, a painter of ceramics, commits suicide in 1937, along with his lover, Augusta, after they have confided in Fraser about their experiences during the First World War. Fraser, who is present in the house and finds the couple dead, is moved by the experience. He returns to Silver Islet, hoping for comfort from Sara, only to reject her at the last moment.
