= Canada Protection Plan =

Life insurance company based in Canada

- Type: Subsidiary
- Industry: Insurance
- Founded: 1992
- Headquarters: Toronto, Ontario, Canada
- Key people: Matt Berman (President, Foresters Financial in the U.S. and Canada)
- Products: Life insurance
- Parent: Foresters Financial
- Website: cpp.ca

Canada Protection Plan (French: Plan de protection du Canada) is a Canadian life insurance distribution company headquartered in Toronto, Ontario. Founded in 1992, its primary product is "no medical and simplified issue" life insurance sold directly and through a network of insurance advisors. In November 2019, the company opened an office in Montreal, Quebec.

On October 1, 2020, Canada Protection Plan was acquired by Toronto-based fraternal life insurer Foresters Financial. Foresters has been the exclusive underwriter of Canada Protection Plan's life insurance products since 2008. With the acquisition, Canada Protection Plan is now a Foresters Financial company. Foresters continues to operate as it did in the United Kingdom and the United States.

Matt Berman, the President of Foresters Financial in the U.S. and Canada, also oversees Canada Protection Plan.

== History ==
Canada Protection Plan was founded in 1992 in Toronto, Ontario, Canada. From its inception, the company offered non-medical permanent life insurance, sold through independent insurance advisors. In 2006, the company introduced its first range of non-medical term life insurance products as well as an inbound call centre which, by 2008, was staffed with licensed Life Insurance Advisors who could sell products over the phone.

On March 25, 2015, Canada Protection Plan introduced additional life insurance coverage, including a 25-year decreasing term product for mortgage protection and a hybrid product, allowing applicants to choose either no medical or full medical underwriting. Eighteen months later, the company increased its no medical face amounts to $500,000 and expanded eligibility to include non-aggressive cancers, coronary artery diseases, and multiple sclerosis.

In October 2019, Canada Protection Plan announced increases in coverage amounts for two of their no medical life insurance plans: Express Elite Term Insurance, increased from $500,000 to $750,000; and Guaranteed Acceptance Life, increased from $25,000 to $50,000. In the following month, Canada Protection Plan opened a new office in Montreal, Quebec, the company's first outside Ontario.

In October 2020, Canada Protection Plan was acquired by Foresters Financial, leveraging the collective strengths of a longstanding relationship between the two organizations.

== Products ==
Canada Protection Plan offers a range of life and critical illness insurance products, many of which are available without the need for medical tests or examinations. All products are available via paper or through a contactless process, from one of over 25,000 independent advisors, or through Canada Protection Plan's in-house licensed insurance advisors. For monthly payment plans, payments begin in the second month.

The A-Z Life Coverage is available as a term or permanent product, which includes guaranteed acceptance, no medical, or fully underwritten, for face amounts of $50,000 to $1 million. The Express Elite Term 20 or 30 Insurance is a no medical product available up to $750,000 and targeted to healthy adults between 18 and 60 years of age.

In April 2020, Canada Protection Plan launched the Cardiac/Cancer Protect CI series of plans, which provides insurance coverage in the event of a critical illness. The product offers cardiac coverage to those, who have had cancer and cancer coverage to those who have had a cardiac-related diagnosis.

== Recognition ==
In 2019 and 2020, Canada Protection Plan was one of the finalists at the annual Insurance Business Canada Awards for The Advocis Award for Life and Health Insurer of the Year. In 2020, Canada Protection Plan was presented with The Advocis Award for Life and Health Insurer of the Year.
