= Foresters Friendly Society =

Friendly society

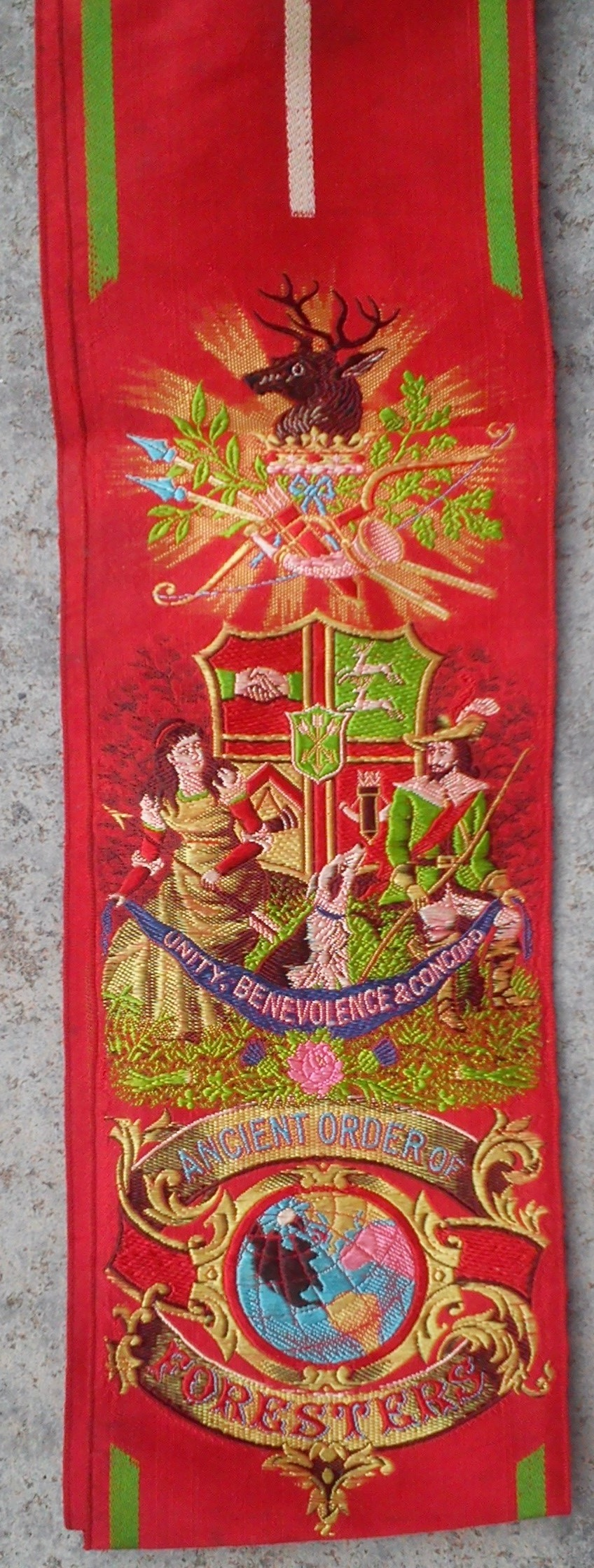
Sash worn by members of the Ancient Order of Foresters

The Foresters Friendly Society is a British friendly society which was formed in 1834 as the Ancient Order of Foresters. As of 31 December 2016, the society had approximately 75,000 members. Its head office is located in Southampton, England.

== History ==
The society was formed in Rochdale (in Greater Manchester, Lancashire, England) in August 1834, when over 300 branches of the Royal Foresters society (established in the 18th century) formed the new Ancient Order of Foresters.

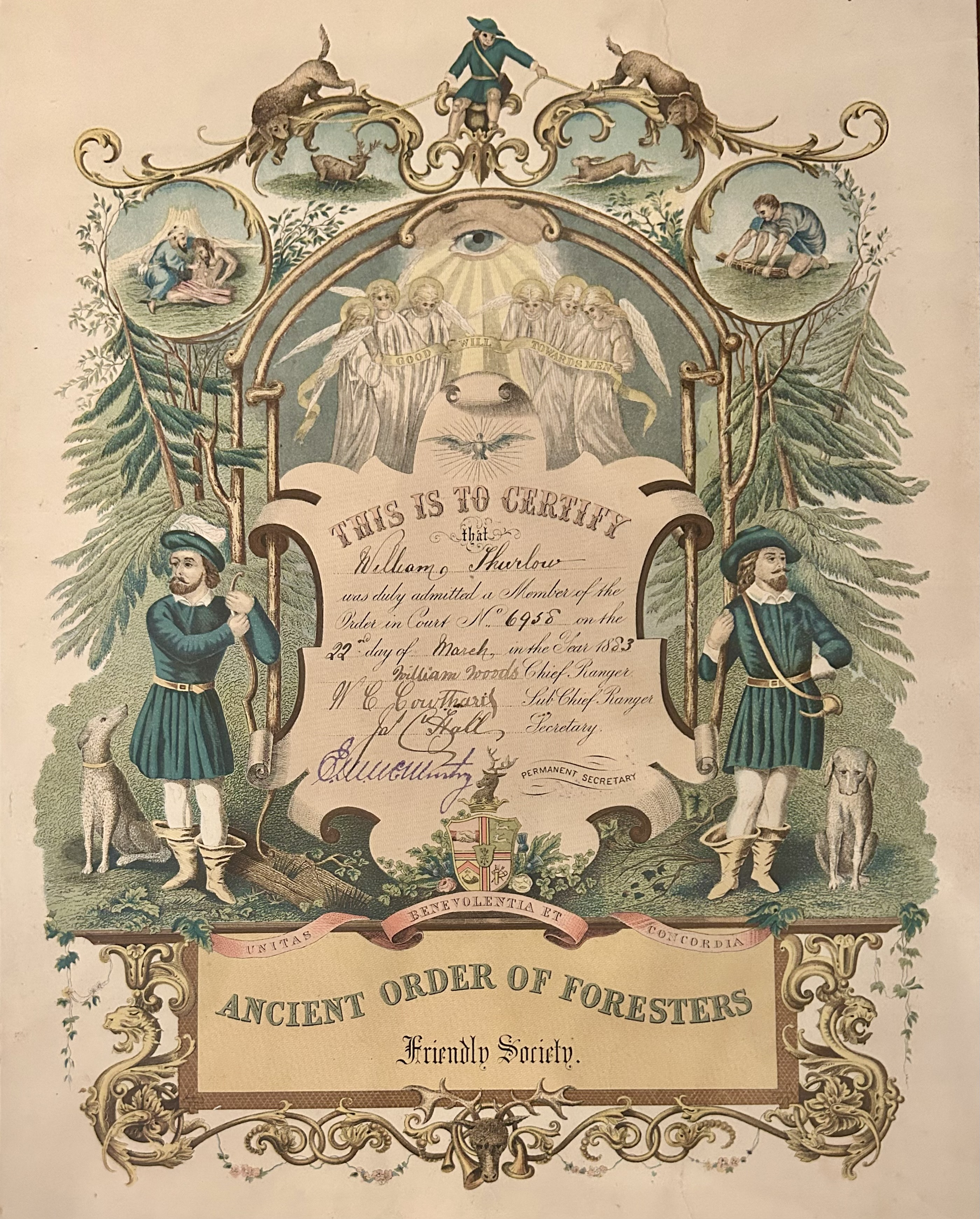
1883 Membership certificate for the Ancient Order of Foresters Court 6938

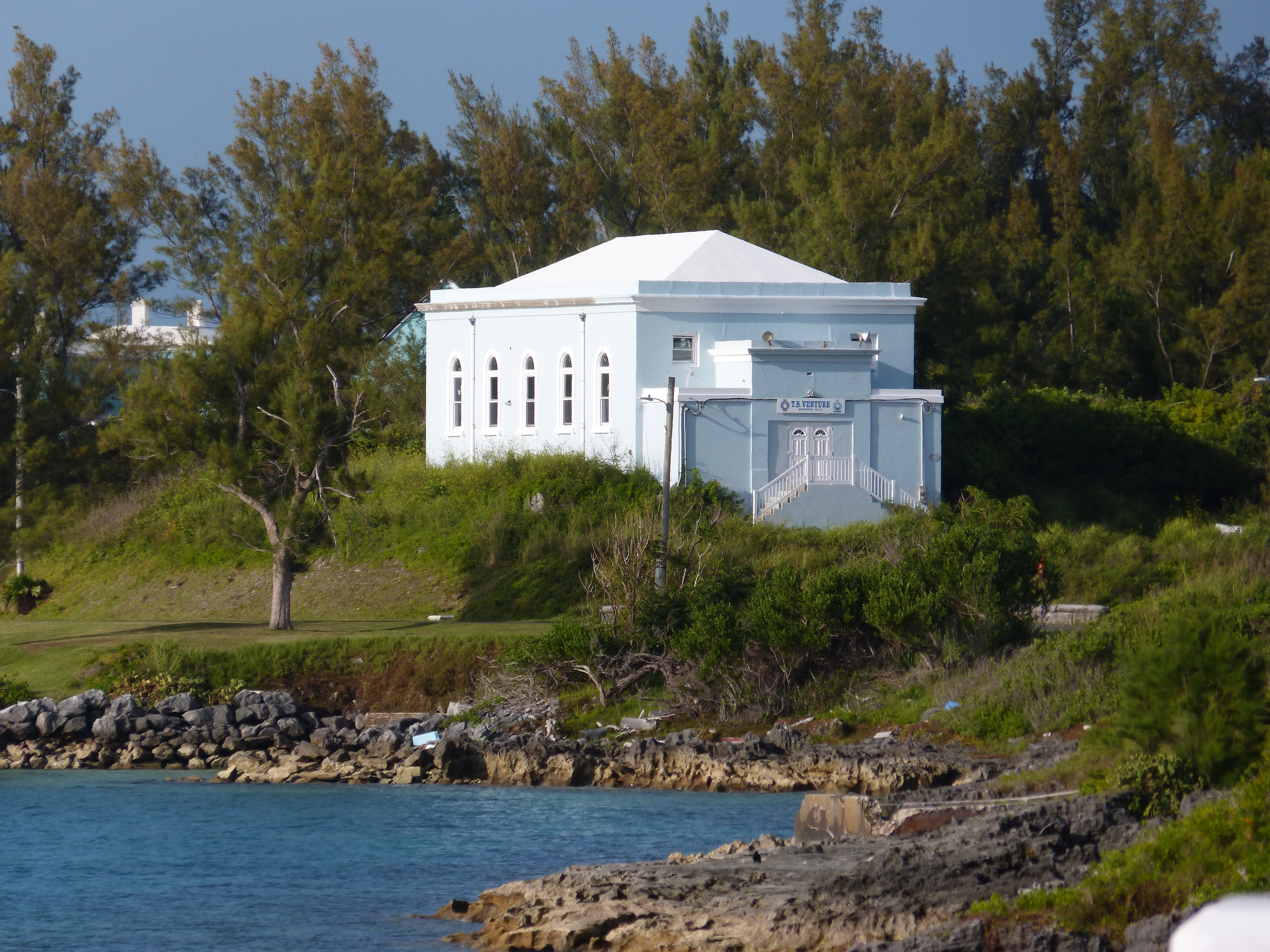
1857 Foresters' Hall at the Royal Naval Dockyard, Bermuda (later a Roman Catholic naval chapel, and currently TS Venture of the Sea Cadet Corps)

In 1874 the American and Canadian Foresters seceded from the Ancient Order of Foresters and set up the Independent Order of Foresters (IOF). The IOF's UK operation is now called Forester Life, based in Bromley, Kent.

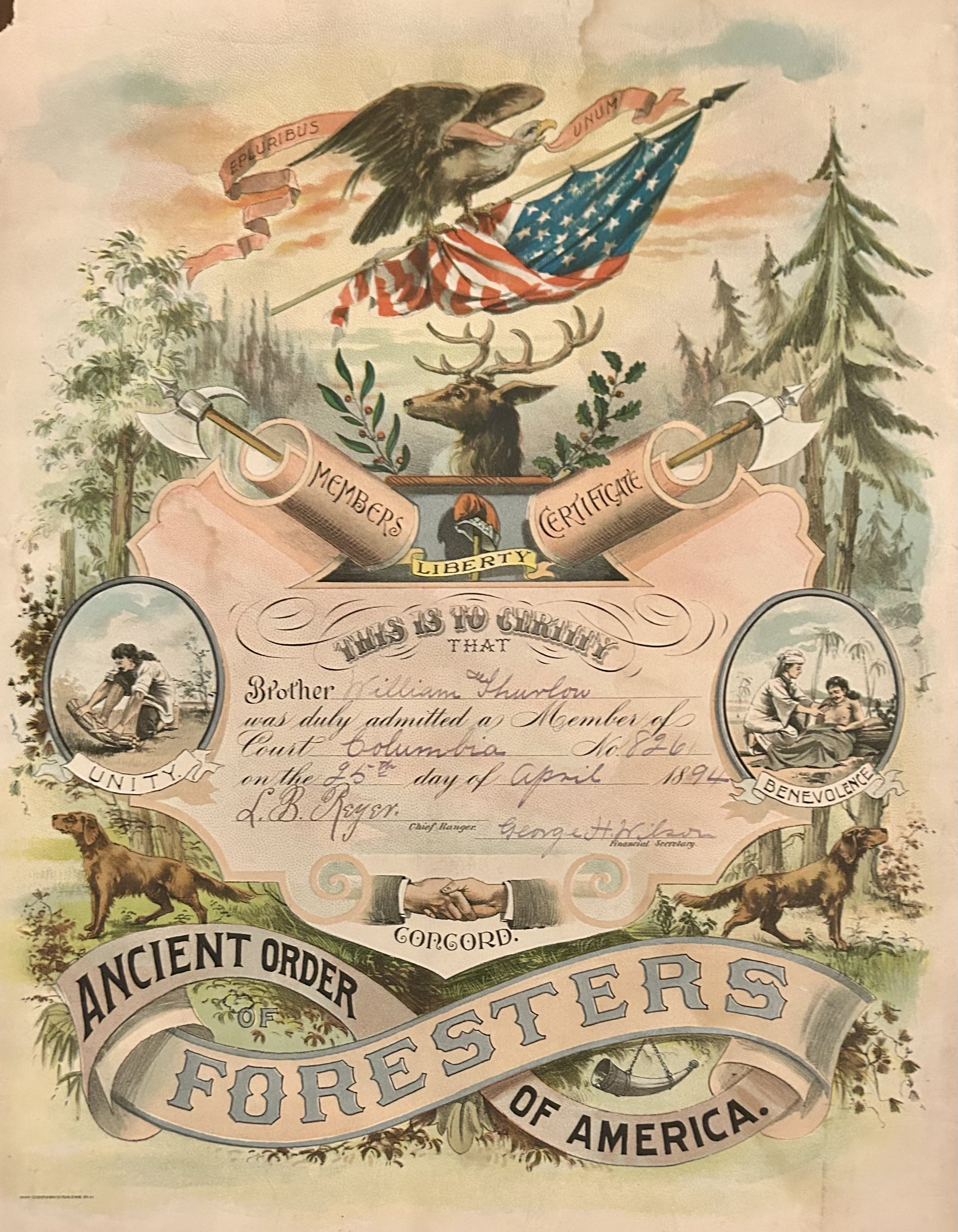
1894 Membership certificate for the Ancient Order of Foresters Court Columbia

The society became incorporated on 1 January 2003 (in accordance with the provisions of The Friendly Societies Act 1992), that year acquired Tunstall Assurance Friendly Society, followed by the Leek Assurance Collecting Society in 2005. On 26 September 2014, it acquired the Post Office Insurance Society (POIS), which added 21,000 members and a further £69.0 million in assets.

The society's local branches are termed "courts", rather than "lodges" as in other friendly societies. They were named after the law courts of the royal forests, and performed the Ancient Ritual of the Society. The most famous was Court LUD No. 10,100, which was formed in 1947, by members of the London District Management Committee. However, owing to lack of members willing to take office, this court was erased in 2004.

Since the society became incorporated the number of courts has slowly reduced and remained stable over the last 10 years at 189 Courts in the British Isles. Internationally, there are courts in Georgetown, Guyana and Paramaribo, Suriname.

The society offers a range of member benefits, and in 2018 nearly £1m was paid out in discretionary grants and benefits, and charitable donations.

The society had its own magazine – Foresters Miscellany, which ran from 1862 to 2008, when it was incorporated into a replacement called The Forester. In late 2016, the publication of Foresters Miscellany restarted with issue 1618 and continues today celebrating Foresters social and fundraising activities in local communities.

== Products ==
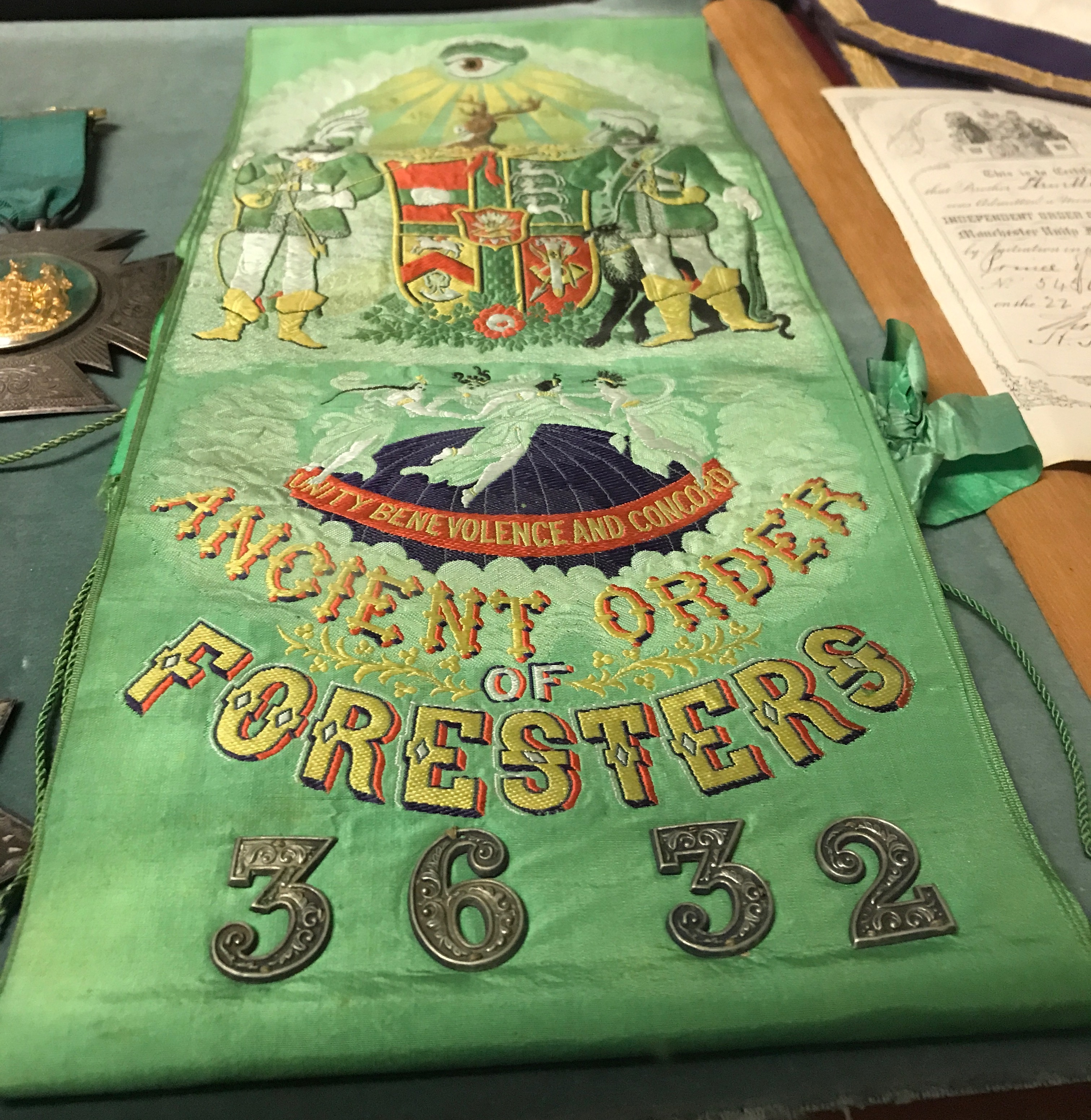
A regalia sash as worn in Court 3632 of the Ancient Order of Foresters. Now a museum exhibit.

The society provides its members with savings policies – including tax exempt savings which are only available via friendly societies. They also offer an Investment Bond, Guaranteed Savings plan and in June 2017 the society launched a Lifetime ISA. Foresters also offer insurance policies against sickness and death. There are also policies for children, including a child tax exempt savings plan. In addition to this, it is also the provider of group insurance to several police forces in the United Kingdom, the Police Service of Northern Ireland being one of the largest, and its Guernsey business mainly consists of medical insurance.

The society is regulated in the United Kingdom by the Financial Conduct Authority.

The total combined assets of the courts (including Guernsey) as of 31 December 2016 was £78.9 million.

As of December 2016, the society had approximately 75,000 members and managed funds of £277m on their members' behalf.

== Management ==
In November 2012, Paul Osborn was appointed as the Chief Executive.

In September 2012, Mike Wilkinson was appointed to the Board, and subsequently elected chairman. Two professional non-executive directors were also welcomed to the board: Michael Allen, latterly of Liverpool Victoria, and John Instance from the Financial Reporting Council.

In 2016, John Instance was appointed the chairman and Myles Edwards was appointed as executive director. The High Chief Ranger (which is equivalent to president) for 2016/17 was Glyn Carpenter and for 2017/18 is Cheryl Eagleson. Each year the High Chief Ranger chooses a charity for whom the society's members fundraise. In 2016/17 this was Canine Partners, and in 2017/18 it is the Association of Air Ambulances Charity.

== Sponsorship ==
In December 2012 Foresters announced its official sponsorship of the Archery GB Olympic and Paralympic teams. In November 2013 Foresters renewed its sponsorship, taking its sponsorship beyond the Rio Olympics.

== See also ==
- Independent Order of Foresters, Canadian Foresters based in Toronto
- Shepherds Friendly Society, another long-standing UK friendly society, formed 1826
