= Jane Urquhart =

Canadian novelist and poet

Jane Urquhart OC
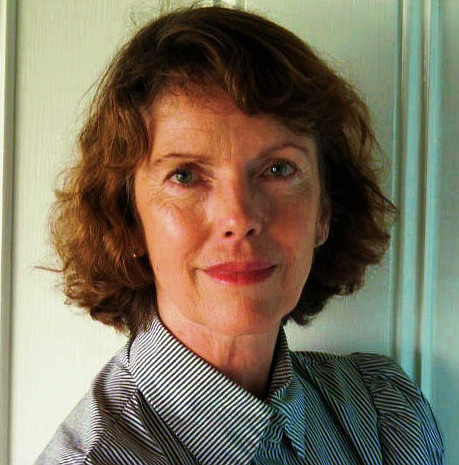
- Urquhart in 2010
- Born: Jane Carter; June 21, 1949 (age 77); Little Longlac, Ontario, Canada
- Education: University of Guelph (BA, 1971; BA, 1976)
- Occupations: Novelist; poet; short story writer
- Spouses: Paul Keele (m. 1968; died 1973) Tony Urquhart (m. 1976; died 2022)
- Children: Emily Urquhart
- Writing career
- Notable works: The Whirlpool; Away; The Underpainter; The Stone Carvers; Sanctuary Line
- Notable awards: Prix du Meilleur Livre Étranger; Trillium Book Award; Governor General's Award for English-language fiction; Marian Engel Award; Harbourfront Festival Prize; Chevalier of the Ordre des Arts et des Lettres

Jane Urquhart (born June 21, 1949) is a Canadian novelist and poet. She is the internationally acclaimed author of seven award-winning novels, three books of poetry, and numerous short stories.

Urquhart is well known for her evocative style, which blends historical and contemporary themes. Her first novel, The Whirlpool (1986), gained her international recognition. She became the first Canadian to win France's prestigious Prix du Meilleur Livre Etranger (Best Foreign Book Award). Her subsequent novels proved as successful: Away (1993) won the Trillium Award and was a national bestseller. Her fourth novel, The Underpainter, won the Governor General's Literary Award in 1997. Some Other Garden, a collection of her best-known poetry, was published in 2000.

== Early life ==
Urquhart was born June 21, 1949, in Little Longlac, a small mining town in northern Ontario. She is the daughter of a mining engineer, Walter Andrew Carter, and Marian Quinn. Quinn grew up on a farm with a large family of six brothers and one sister. After their marriage, the couple moved to Little Longlac for Carter's work. It was there that they had three children, Urquhart being the youngest and their only daughter.

The family's heritage made a lasting impact on Urquhart's writing. Her mother's Irish ancestors were immigrants who arrived in Canada in the mid nineteenth century during the Great Famine. Both of Urquhart's parents had witnessed the trials of World War I and World War II. With such a background, Urquhart's childhood was filled with the stories of Ireland and settlement in Canada. "The women are the people who pass the stories down through the generations in any family," Urquhart says. "Occasionally, one of the men would tell a story. When they did, it was a very exciting event, and it was often war-related. But the women were constantly gossiping. I've always been a great believer that gossip is not an evil thing. I see it as an investigation of human nature."

== Education ==
Urquhart attended John Ross Robertson Public School until the end of Grade Seven, moving to Havergal College, a private school for girls, for grades eight to twelve. After that, she attended a junior college in B.C. for one semester before enrolling at the University of Guelph. In an interview, Urquhart recalls that very little of her childhood education touched on Canadian history or Canadian literature. "We were very much a colony when I was in...school, and so the past as I knew it survived in a physical sort of way. It existed in barns and rail fences and Ontario Gothic farmhouses, old woodstoves." As a result, Urquhart developed a fascination with landscape which would carry throughout her entire collection of works. Following her semester in junior college, Urquhart went to the University of Guelph and earned a BA in 1971 in English literature. In 1973, she returned, this time to study art history, completing her second BA in 1976.

== Personal life ==
In 1968, Urquhart married Paul Keele who was then a student at the Ontario College of Art, and later at the Nova Scotia College of Art and design. Urquhart worked as an assistant to the information officer for the Royal Canadian Navy while Keele was still in school. Keele died in a car accident in 1973 when Urquhart was only 24.

Keele's death spurred Urquhart to return to school: "I wanted to study art history, partly to honour him and partly to be near a number of friends we had made while we lived in and around Guelph." The experience of loss at such a young age shaped Urquhart's writing, particularly Whirlpool, whose protagonist was similarly a young widow. "I think the fact that Paul died when he did, when we were both so young, allowed me to remember what it was like to experience such a devastating loss early in life, as my characters do in this book," she explains.

In 1976, Urquhart married the Canadian visual artist Tony Urquhart. At the time, Tony Urquhart had four children from a previous marriage, so the couple's early years together were filled with children and family life. Jane Urquhart speaks of the time: "It was great...we were all sort of the same age...I'd had no experience with children so I had no experience with disciplining children which meant that I didn't know how to do it. I was the youngest in my family. And so my role in relation to them was never very clearly defined and, as a result, we were just able to develop kind of a friendship." The necessity of being at home, especially when her own daughter Emily was born in 1977, contributed to her writing, and she scheduled writing time every day.

Urquhart also owned an Irish-style cottage in McGillicuddy Reeks from 1996 to 2013 which she used as a writing retreat and an occasional home. The cottage, on the verge of Lake Ontario, was the place she spent many summer vacations while growing up. Urquhart now resides in South-Eastern Ontario. Her husband Tony Urquhart died in 2022.

== Works ==
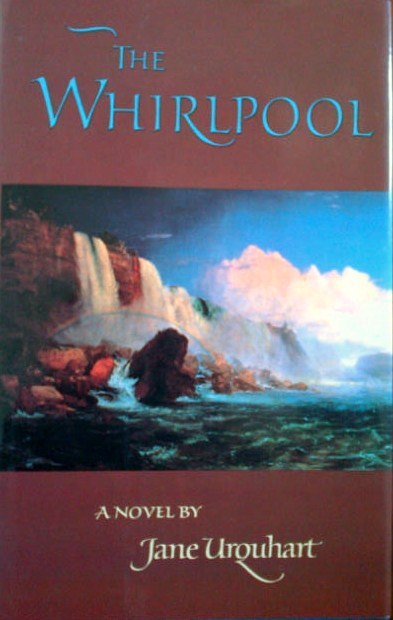
The Whirlpool

Urquhart is the author of seven internationally acclaimed novels including: The Whirlpool (entitled Niagara in France), the first Canadian book to win France's prestigious Prix du Meilleur livre etranger; Changing Heaven; Away; The Underpainter; The Stone Carvers; A Map of Glass, and Sanctuary Line.

She is also the author of a collection of short fiction, Storm Glass, and four books of poetry, I Am Walking in the Garden of His Imaginary Palace, False Shuffles, The Little Flowers of Madame de Montespan, and Some Other Garden. Her work, which is published in many countries, has been translated into numerous foreign languages. She also wrote the biography of Lucy Maud Montgomery for the Penguin Extraordinary Canadians series and is the editor of the most recent Penguin Book of Canadian Short Stories, and she edited and introduced a collection of Alice Munro's love stories entitled No Love Lost for The New Canadian Library.

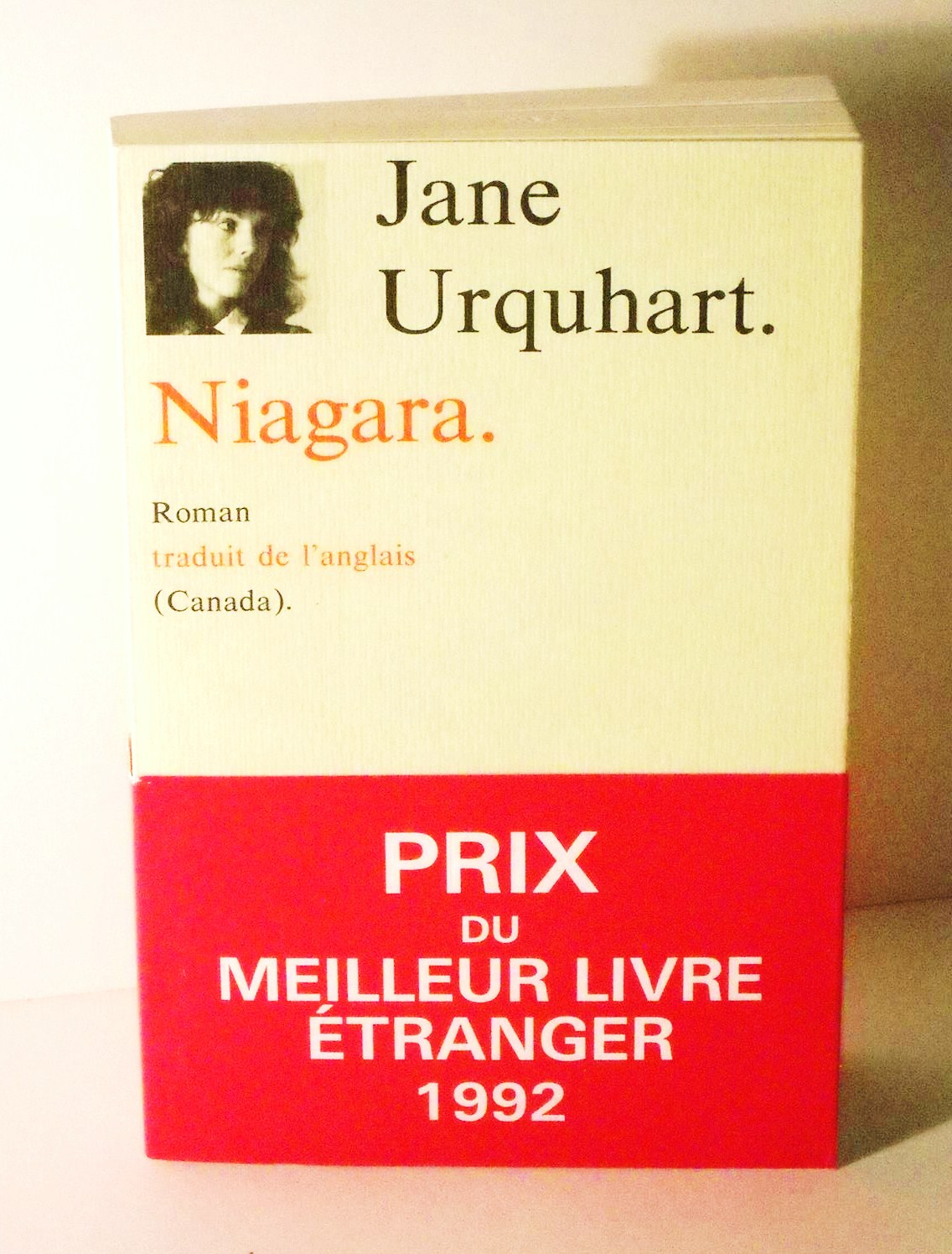
French edition of The Whirlpool

Urquhart has received numerous honorary doctorates from Canadian universities, including the University of Toronto (2000), the Royal Military College (2007), and Carleton University, Ottawa (2016). She also has been writer-in-residence at the University of Ottawa and at Memorial University of Newfoundland, and, during the winter and spring of 1997, she held the Presidential Writer-in-Residence Fellowship at the University of Toronto.

She has also given readings and lectures in Canada, Britain, Europe, the US, and Australia, has twice been a keynote speaker at the annual Canadian Congress of the Humanities, and has been on the Board of PEN Canada and on the Advisory Board for the Restoration of the Vimy Memorial. She has been on several international prize juries including that of the International Dublin IMPAC Award, the Giller Prize, and the American International Neustadt Award.

Her books have been published in many countries, including Holland, France, Germany, Britain, Scandinavia, Australia, and The United States, and have been translated into several languages.

=== Novels ===
- The Whirlpool. Toronto: McClelland & Stewart, 1986. ISBN 9780771086878
- Changing Heaven. Toronto: McClelland & Stewart, 1990. ISBN 978-0-87923-895-7
- Fragment of a Novel in Progress. Ottawa: Magnum Bookstore, 1992
- Away. Toronto: McClelland & Stewart, 1993. ISBN 9780747516774
- The Underpainter. Toronto: McClelland & Stewart, 1997. ISBN 9780771086649
- The Stone Carvers. Toronto: McClelland & Stewart, 2001. ISBN 9780771086878
- A Map of Glass. Toronto: McClelland & Stewart, 2005. ISBN 9780771087271
- Sanctuary Line. Toronto: McClelland & Stewart, 2010. ISBN 9781596923669
- The Night Stages. McClelland & Stewart, 2015. ISBN 9780771094422
- In Winter I Get Up at Night, 2024

=== Non-fiction ===
- Extraordinary Canadians: Lucy Maud Montgomery. Penguin Canada, 2009. ISBN 978-0670066759
- A Number of Things: Stories of Canada Told Through Fifty Objects. Toronto: Patrick Crean Editions, 2016. ISBN 978-1443432061

=== Short story anthology ===
- Storm Glass. Erin, Ontario: The Porcupine's Quill, 1987. ISBN 9780889841062

=== Articles and other writing ===
- "Afterword." As Birds Bring Forth the Sun and Other Stories by Alistair MacLeod. New Canadian Library, 1986. ISBN 978-0771098826
- "Introduction." In Transit by Mavis Gallant. Penguin, 2006. ISBN 9780143055037
- "Night walk (Jane Urquhart remembers Ken Adachi)." Brick v. 35 (Mar. 1989): 37-38.
- "Familiar Roads Home: Second thoughts on rereading The Lost Salt Gift of Blood by Alistair MacLeod." The Globe and Mail (Metro edition). 4 May 1991, E: 1, E4.
- "Returning to the Village" Writing Away: The PEN Canada Travel Anthology. Constance Rooke, editor. Toronto: McClelland and Stewart, 1994. ISBN 9780771069567
- "Afterword." No Love Lost by Alice Munro. New Canadian Library, 2003. ISBN 9780771034817
- "Introduction." The Penguin Book of Canadian Short Stories. Toronto: Penguin, 2007. ISBN 9780771034817
- "Afterword." Emily Climbs by Lucy Maud Montgomery. New Canadian Library (2009). ISBN 9781770497481

=== Poetry ===
- I'm Walking in the Garden of His Imaginary Palace: Eleven Poems for Le Notre. Toronto: Aya Press, 1982. ISBN 9780920544259
- False Shuffles. Victoria: Porcépic, 1982. Toronto: Aya Press, 1982. ISBN 9780888782045
- The Little Flowers of Madame de Montespan. Erin, Ontario: Porcupine's Quill, 1983. ISBN 9780889840492
- Some Other Garden. Toronto: McClelland & Stewart, 2000. ISBN 9780771086694

=== Editor ===
- The Penguin Book of Canadian Short Stories. Toronto: Penguin, 2007. ISBN 9780771034817

== Awards and honours ==
=== Literary awards ===
- The Whirlpool won France's Prix du Meilleur Livre Étranger (Best Foreign Book Award). It was the first Canadian book to win the award.
- Away won the Trillium Book Award.
- The Underpainter won the 1997 Governor General's Award for English-language fiction.
- Urquhart received the Marian Engel Award and the Harbourfront Festival Prize.

=== Finalist and longlist selections ===
- Away was a finalist for the International Dublin Literary Award.
- The Underpainter was a finalist for the Rogers Writers' Trust Fiction Prize.
- The Stone Carvers was a finalist for the Giller Prize and the Governor General's Award for English-language fiction. It was also longlisted for the Booker Prize in 2001.
- A Map of Glass was a regional finalist for Best Book in the Commonwealth Writers' Prize.
- Sanctuary Line was a finalist for the Giller Prize.
- In Winter I Get Up at Night was longlisted for the 2024 Giller Prize.

=== Honours ===
- Urquhart is an Officer of the Order of Canada.
- She is a Chevalier of France's Ordre des Arts et des Lettres.
- She received honorary doctorates from the University of Toronto (2000), the Royal Military College of Canada (2007), and Carleton University (2016).
