= Foresters Financial =

North American fraternal order

The Independent Order of Foresters

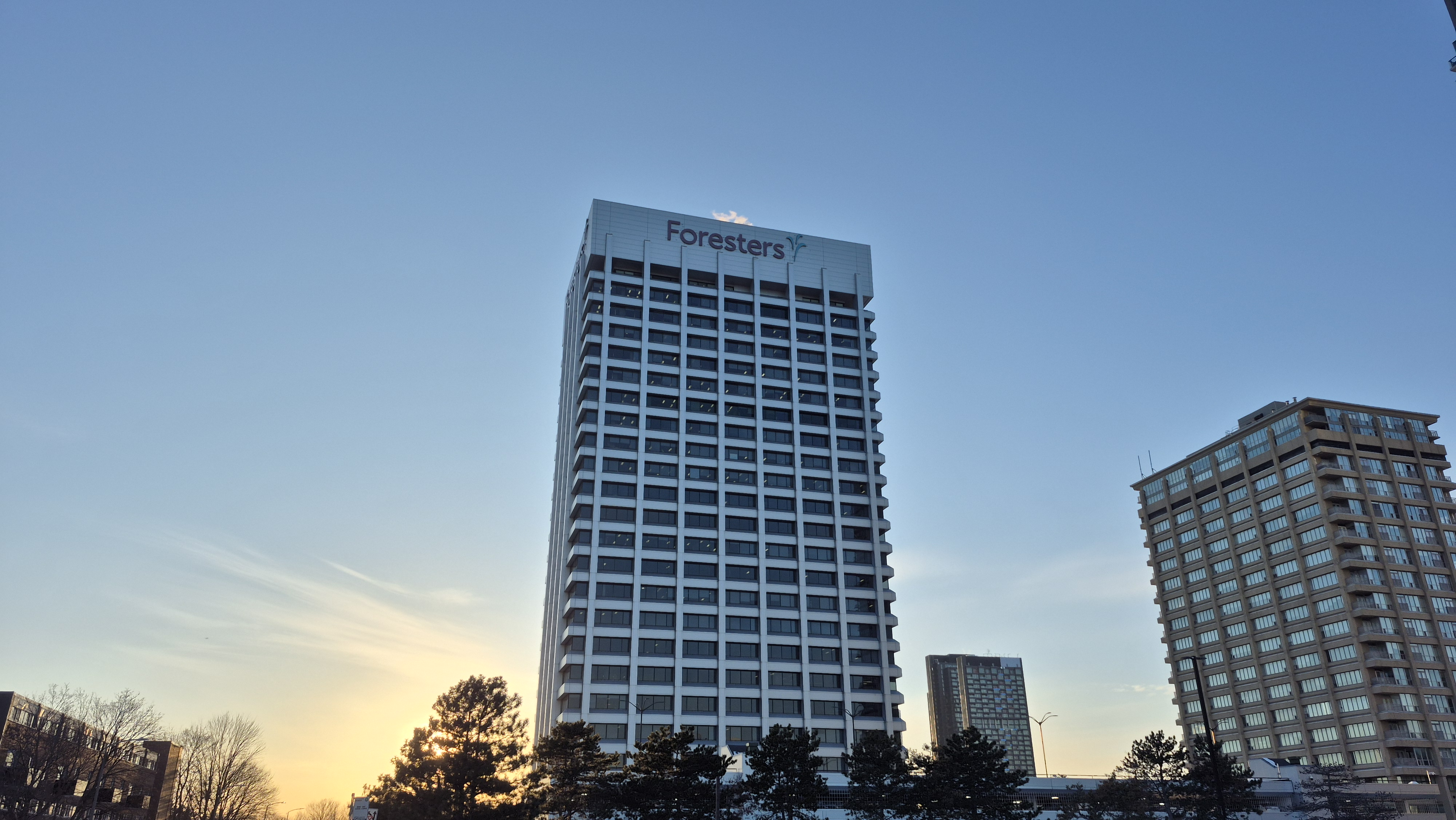
- Foresters Financials' Don Mills headquarters
- Trade name: Foresters Financial
- Type: Fraternal benefit society
- Industry: Financial services
- Founded: 1874; 152 years ago
- Headquarters: Toronto, Ontario, Canada
- Areas served: Canada; United Kingdom; United States
- Products: Life insurance; Life annuity
- Subsidiaries: Canada Protection Plan
- Website: foresters.com

The Independent Order of Foresters, operating as Foresters Financial, is a fraternal benefit society headquartered in Toronto, Ontario, Canada, that provides life insurance and other financial solutions in Canada, the United Kingdom, and the United States. As of 2024, Matt Berman has served as the company's president and CEO.

== History ==
Foresters traces its origins to a British Friendly Society, a mutual organization caring for the sick. Membership was originally gained by combat, first with quarterstaffs, then with swords and finally with cudgels, until initiation by combat was abandoned in 1843.

In 1834, the Royal Foresters formed a Friendly Society, the Ancient Order of Foresters (AOF). The Independent Order of Foresters (IOF) in the United States became independent of the AOF in 1874.

The expansion of the IOF into Canada in 1875 is attributed to a doctor and community leader, Oronhyatekha. Of Mohawk descent, he was born in 1841 at Six Nations near present-day Brantford, Ontario, Oronhyatekha ("Burning Sky") was baptized Peter Martin and later attended Oxford, where he became a medical doctor.

Dr. Oronhyatekha held the office of Supreme Chief Ranger (now called "International Fraternal President") from 1879 until 1906; he died in 1907. Foresters membership reached 257,000 in 1906. Through the 20th century it amalgamated with various other fraternal organizations, including the Ontario part of one of the oldest, the Ancient Order of United Workmen, acquired in 1926, the Modern Brotherhood of America, acquired in 1931, and the Order of Scottish Clans, acquired in 1971.

Like other friendly societies and fraternal organizations of the time, Foresters helped transform the insurance industry by extending insurance benefits to the average working family. In addition to admitting women as full members, Foresters provided orphan benefits to the children of deceased Foresters members.

Foresters acquired Unity Life of Canada in 2008, which subsequently rebranded as Foresters Life Insurance Company in January 2012.

As of 2014, Foresters Financial operated a separate UK division based in Bromley, South London.

In April 2019, Macquarie Group's investing division agreed to buy $12.3 billion in assets from Foresters Financial, including Foresters' First Investors mutual funds business. In the same year, the company sold its U.S. broker-dealer to Cetera Financial Group, in efforts to focus on life insurance.

In May 2019, Foresters sold its Canadian money management unit, Foresters Asset Management, to Fiera Capital. In October 2019, the company sold Foresters Financial Holding and Foresters Life Insurance and Annuity Company to Nassau Financial Group.

In October 2020, Foresters Financial acquired life insurance distributor Canada Protection Plan. Canada Protection Plan was rebranded as "Canada Protection Plan, a Foresters Financial company".

In July 2021, Foresters invested in a capital project to transform the UK London office. As part of Foresters sustainability roadmap, Renewable Energy Generation Assets and Energy Saving Products were utilized. The investment will reduce the CO_{2} emissions by up to 10,000 kg per year.

In 2024, Foresters reached 150 years in business, serving 2.6 million clients and families in Canada, the US and the UK. The company continues to invest and support the community, including partnership with nonprofit KaBOOM!, which has helped Foresters build more than 170 playgrounds across the U.S. and Canada since 2006.

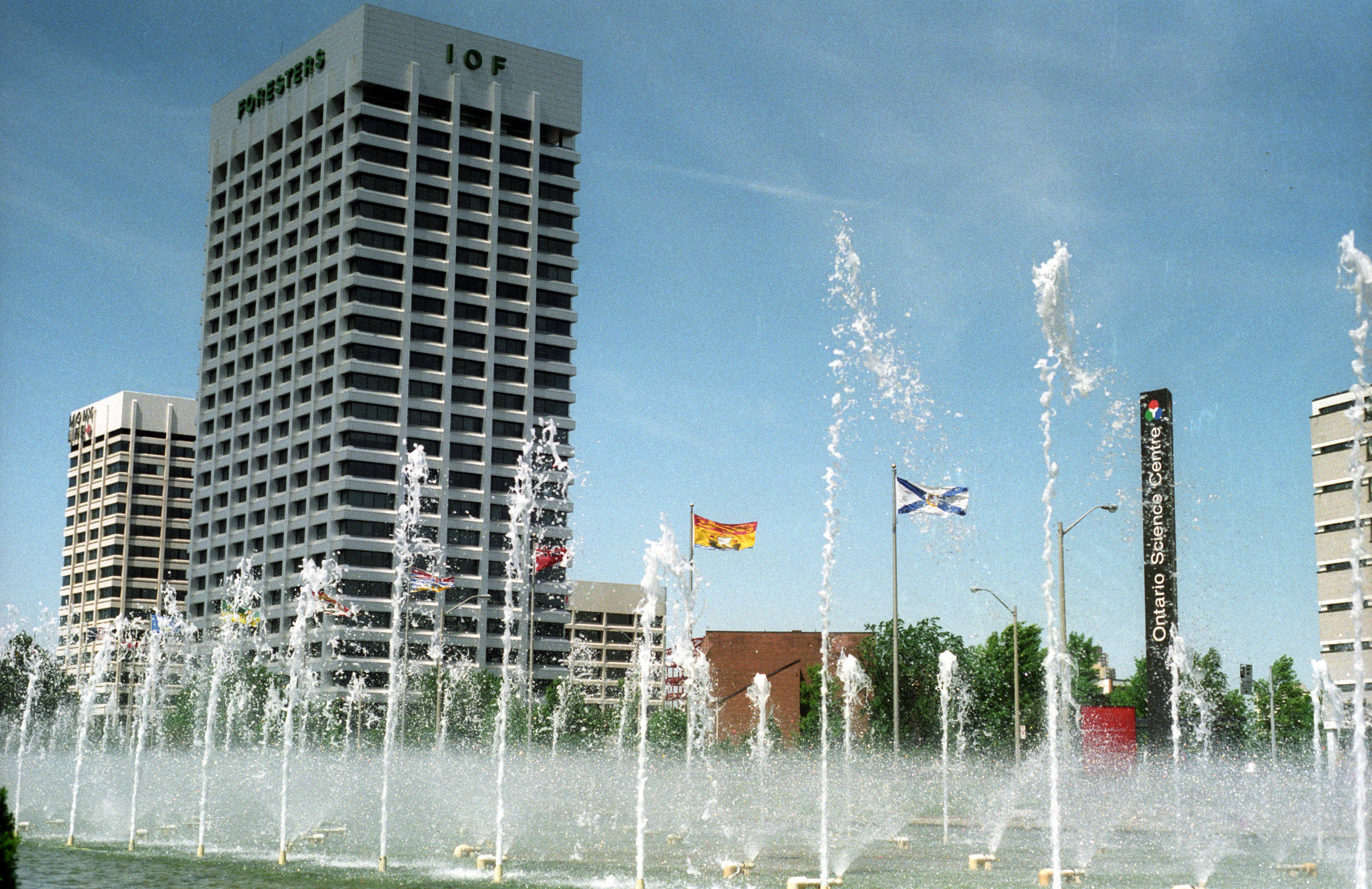
Foresters Building as seen from the Ontario Science Centre

== Products ==
Foresters Financial offers term and permanent policies, including:

- Term life insurance policies lasting 10, 20, or 30 years.
- Three types of Whole Life insurance covering children, all ages and 50-85.
- Various policy riders to cover spouses, children, disability and death benefits.

The company's structure as a fraternal organization also includes benefits such as discounted legal services, scholarships, and community grants.

== See also ==
- Ancient Order of Foresters
