= Murray Menkes =

Canadian property developer

- Born: April 21, 1926; Toronto
- Died: April 26, 2013 (aged 87); Toronto
- Occupation: Real estate developer
- Spouse: Pauline Weintraub (m. 1949)
- Children: Alan; Steven; Peter

Murray Menkes (April 21, 1926 – April 24, 2013) was a Canadian property developer and founder of Menkes Developments Ltd. in North York, Ontario, which became one of the largest developers in the Toronto area.

== Early life and family ==
Murray Menkes was born in Toronto on April 21, 1926, to Max and Anne Menkes. His parents were Polish immigrants and came to Canada in the late 1910s. Menkes in his youth started working at his father's fur business until he realized that he can be more successful selling real estate in the 1940s. In 1949 Menkes married Pauline Weintraub and together had three sons Alan, Steven and Peter. His three sons as well as grandsons Jared, Adam, Jason and Sean work at Menkes's company Menkes Developments.

== Menkes Developments ==
Menkes started Menkes Developments in 1954 with the purchase of several residential buildings in Toronto. Menkes had started out small with building single-family homes and later expanded with rental apartments, condominiums and office properties. By the 1960s, Menkes expanded greatly with the addition of an apartment complex on his property investments. Menkes Developments under Menkes became one of the largest private real estate developers in Canada. In 1984 Menkes Developments built the Procter & Gamble building near Yonge Street and Sheppard Avenue. Several other notable buildings built by Menkes Development is the Four Seasons Hotel in Yorkville, Harbour Plaza and Sun Life Financial Tower. As of 2013, Menkes Development has developed over 15,000 homes and condominiums. Menkes has been credited with creating the modern North York City Centre.
