= Cetera Financial Group =

Financial services provider in California, US

Cetera Financial Group Inc
- Company type: Private.
- Industry: Financial services
- Founded: 2010
- Headquarters: 655 W. Broadway, 12th Floor; San Diego, CA 92101
- Key people: Michael Durbin, CEO; Jeff Buchheister, CFO; Tom Gooley, COO
- Revenue: US$$2.7 billion as of December 31, 2022
- Number of employees: 1,832 (2022)
- Website: www.cetera.com

Cetera Financial Group (commonly referred to as Cetera) is an independent wealth hub and financial services provider comprising, among other companies, one of the largest families of independent registered investment advisers and broker-dealers in the United States. As such, Cetera provides financial advisors, tax professionals, and financial institutions with market and investment research, client-service platforms and technologies, trade execution and portfolio management services, and back-office support.

As of December 31, 2022, Cetera oversees approximately $322 billion in assets under administration and $115 billion in assets under management, serving over 8,000 independent financial professionals and 400 banks and credit unions, representing 1.8 million investors. Cetera has corporate offices throughout the United States, including San Diego, El Segundo, and Walnut Creek, California; Greenwood Village, Colorado; Atlanta, Georgia; Schaumburg, Illinois; and St. Cloud, Minnesota.

Cetera’s firms are members of FINRA and SIPC.

== History ==
Cetera was established in February 2010 when Dutch multinational banking and financial services corporation ING Group sold three broker-dealers to private equity firm Lightyear Capital. The three broker-dealers—Financial Network Investment Corporation, founded in 1983, Multi-Financial Securities Corporation, founded in 1981, and PrimeVest Financial Services founded in 1984—were rebranded in September 2012, becoming Cetera Advisor Networks, Cetera Advisors, and Cetera Investment Services (marketed as Cetera Financial Institutions and Cetera Investors), respectively. That same year, Cetera purchased the tax and accountant-focused Genworth Financial Investment Services and rebranded it as Cetera Financial Specialists.

In April 2014, RCS Capital Corporation purchased Cetera among its acquisitions of other independent broker dealers and registered investment advisers, including First Allied Securities in September 2013; Investors Capital Holdings Ltd., and Summit Brokerage Services, and JP Turner & Company in June 2014; Girard Securities in March 2015 and VSR Group in May 2015.

In May 2016, Cetera completed a transformation into an independent, privately held organization under its parent company, Aretec Group, Inc. Through this restructuring process, a new board of directors was established.

In May 2017, Cetera announced the launch of its advisory platform, My Advice Architect. The platform has since grown to host more than $100 billion in assets.

In July 2018, Genstar Capital announced its intention to acquire the majority interest in the Cetera Financial Group. The transaction was completed in October 2018.

In May 2023, Mike Durbin was named chief executive officer of Cetera Holdings, the holding company of Cetera Financial Group, and a member of Cetera’s board of directors.

== Mergers and Acquisitions ==
In April 2019, Cetera completed the purchase of select assets of Foresters Financial’s U.S. broker-dealer and investment advisory business, rebranding it and the 43 branches it comprises as Cetera Investors.

In June 2021, Cetera completed the acquisition of assets related to Voya Financial Advisors’ independent financial planning channel. The new business was branded Cetera Wealth Partners.

In January 2023, Cetera entered into a definitive agreement to acquire the retail wealth business of Securian Financial Group, Inc. The new community will be rebranded as Cetera Wealth Management Group, a region within Cetera Advisor Networks.

== Legal ==
In December 2020, Cetera Advisor Networks, Cetera Advisors, and Cetera Financial Specialists agreed to pay the Financial Industry Regulatory Authority (FINRA) a $1 million fine following allegations that the firms had failed to supervise their dually registered representatives.
