= Hollis Jeffcoat =

American painter (1952–2018)

- Born: Hollis Garland Jeffcoat; May 13, 1952; Fort Myers, Florida, U.S.
- Died: April 28, 2018 (aged 65); Fort Myers, Florida, U.S.
- Education: Kansas City Art Institute; New York Studio School
- Known for: Painting, drawing
- Style: Abstract painting
- Partner(s): Jean-Paul Riopelle (late 1970s–1986); Maureen Watson (2001–2018)
- Website: hollisjeffcoat.com

Hollis Garland Jeffcoat (May 13, 1952 – April 28, 2018) was an American abstract painter whose paintings drew on landscape and were built around line, color, form, and light. She worked in the United States, France, and Canada, and later returned to southwest Florida, where Sanibel Island and the Gulf coast became major sources for her late work.

Jeffcoat studied at the Kansas City Art Institute and the New York Studio School, and in the late 1970s lived and worked in Joan Mitchell's household in Vétheuil, France. Her work is held by the Brooklyn Museum and the Musée d'art contemporain de Montréal, and two works on paper are held in the Joan Mitchell Foundation archive.

== Early life and education ==
Jeffcoat was born in Fort Myers, Florida, and grew up in Lee County. Coming from a family with a hunting tradition, she learned to shoot around age nine and went bird hunting in the area. As a child, she also accompanied her family on ferry trips delivering meat provisions to Sanibel Island.

She graduated from Fort Myers High School in 1970, studied with Florida artist Gale Bennett, attended Palm Beach Junior College, and completed an A.A. degree at Edison Junior College in 1972, now Florida SouthWestern State College.

At the Kansas City Art Institute (1972–73) she studied with Wilbur Niewald, and at the New York Studio School (1973–76) with Andrew Forge, Philip Guston, Jack Tworkov, Charles Cajori, Nicolas Carone, George McNeil, and Mercedes Matter; she also attended art history lectures by Meyer Schapiro. Her broader painterly influences included Giotto, Cézanne, and Matisse, as well as artists associated with the New York School and postwar abstraction.

Andrew Forge's response to her work as a student helped confirm that painting could and would be a way of life for her.

She later returned to the New York Studio School as a visiting artist and lecturer, and in 2009 participated in a panel on Mercedes Matter.

== Career ==
=== Mitchell, Riopelle, and the Vétheuil years ===
In summer 1976, Jeffcoat went to Paris as administrator of the New York Studio School's Paris program. Elaine de Kooning, who was teaching there, brought her to visit Mitchell in Vétheuil; Jeffcoat remained through the summer and returned in fall 1977, moving into La Tour, Mitchell's property outside the village.

She served as Mitchell's assistant and lived within Mitchell's immediate circle, which included Canadian painter Jean-Paul Riopelle.

In 1980–81, Jeffcoat was invited by Aimé Maeght to the Fondation Maeght in Saint-Paul-de-Vence, and during this period she worked in porcelain, charcoal, and etchings. Riopelle was also at the Fondation developing a porcelain ceiling project with ceramist Hans Spinner, and Jeffcoat was actively involved in that process.

Her first solo exhibition was held at the Theo Waddington Gallery in Montreal in 1981. Jeffcoat exhibited regularly in Montreal from the early 1980s into the 1990s. The 1984 solo exhibition at Galerie Breteau in Paris was reviewed in Marie-France and Le Monde.

Between September 1985 and February 1986, Jeffcoat painted The White Goose Hunt, a group of fifteen to twenty paintings on a single subject — Île aux Oies in the St. Lawrence River, Quebec — her first sustained body of work organized around a themed series.

In Canada, Jeffcoat also pursued woodcut printmaking at Bonnie Baxter's studio in Val-David, Quebec.

=== New York and the Northeast ===
In 1988, Jeffcoat moved to New York. Her first New York solo exhibition, Landscapes, 1987–1989: Return to America, opened at Achim Moeller Fine Art in 1989; the exhibition included paintings titled after Place des Vosges in Paris and Prospect Park in Brooklyn. The exhibition was reviewed in Art International.

Through the late 1980s and 1990s, she worked repeatedly across the northeastern United States and Canada, including Connecticut, Maine, Georgia, and the Laurentian region north of Montreal. These places became the basis for serial groups of works such as La Source, La Chute, L'Esterel, Nuns' Beach, and Sprucehead.

=== Return to southwest Florida ===
Jeffcoat returned to Southwest Florida in 1998 to co-teach with Gale Bennett — who had taught her as a teenager — at ArtStudy Florida, Bennett's workshop program based in Matlacha on Pine Island. She established her own studio in Matlacha early that year. That year she also took on teaching and lecturing roles across southwest Florida, including monthly lectures at the SoCo Art Group in Fort Myers and painting classes at the Barrier Island Group for the Arts (BIG Arts) on Sanibel.

She met Maureen Watson in Naples in 2001, and together they co-founded the SilverTree School of Painting and Drawing in Naples in 2002.

After the closure of the school, Watson relocated to New York City, and Jeffcoat joined her there. Jeffcoat was among the artists living and working at 475 Kent Avenue, a building of artist lofts and studios on the Williamsburg waterfront in Brooklyn. Following the building evacuation by the New York City Fire Department in 2008, Jeffcoat participated in 475 KENT Lives, a group exhibition at the Queens Museum of Art organized for the displaced residents. This event precipitated their move to Sanibel Island the same year.

In 2008, Watson opened Watson MacRae Gallery on Sanibel Island, with Jeffcoat, Pattie Lipman, and Deborah Masters as its founding artists.

=== Final years ===
In her final years, Jeffcoat continued to paint while confronting serious illness. Her final exhibition during her lifetime was That Devil Paint, a two-person show with W. Darby Bannard at Watson MacRae Gallery, Sanibel, where she exhibited new paintings from her Stories: A Narrative Abstraction series.

Later that year, Watson MacRae Gallery organized Hollis Jeffcoat: My Life in Paint, a retrospective exhibition of paintings, drawings, and prints spanning her career from early paintings in France to her final works on Sanibel.

== Work ==
=== Landscape and abstraction ===
Each painting, for Jeffcoat, was a process of discovery rather than illustration — worked and reworked until its internal structure emerged. Her primary concerns were color, line, form, and light, with landscape as her recurring source. In the late 1980s, following her return to New York, she moved away from landscape painting and began experimenting with new materials and approaches; her previously solid and structured paintings gave way to more abstract and dematerialized forms.

Although oil paint remained her primary medium, she worked on linen, canvas, vellum, wood, Plexiglas, and paper, and also made prints and works in gouache and watercolor. Her work drew repeatedly on landscape as a source, and her use of color was often emphasized.

La Source (1993) grew from sketches of rivers and streams made during visits to Georgia and Connecticut. La Chute (1994) developed from drawings of waterfalls in northwestern Connecticut; the French title carried a double meaning — literal waterfall (une chute d'eau) and other kinds of falls, from grace, from illusions, or from a height.

L'Esterel (1994–1996) was inspired by a large lake north of Montreal in the Laurentian Valley, where Jeffcoat lived for a number of years and often returned. Nuns' Beach (1995) was based on a shore near a convent retreat near Madison, Connecticut, where she sketched around daybreak in the summer months. Sprucehead (1995–1997) was based on a small inlet on Penobscot Bay in Maine, where she returned repeatedly over a period of years.

The Abraxas series (1996) marked an important material development, growing from sketches made at a farm outside Toronto and introducing her use of oil on vellum, a support prized for its translucency and the sense of space it made possible. The Canonica works (1996), originating in Umbria in Italy, extended her landscape sources beyond North America.

The Fount series (1997) moved away from depictions of specific places toward more generalized work.

=== Sanibel, water, and marine imagery ===
After returning to Sanibel, Jeffcoat's work shifted toward the coastal environment of southwest Florida. The Gulf, mangroves, and underwater marine forms became recurring subjects; paintings such as Storm Over Buck Key drew on coastal weather, while works including Nage and Grande Meduse explored jellyfish and underwater space as recurring motifs. By 2010–2011 the paintings increasingly aimed to convey not only what water looked like but what it felt like to be within it.

Open-heart surgery and recovery temporarily reshaped her materials; unable to work in her usual physically demanding way, she turned to colored pencil, watercolor, gouache, and clayboard before returning to oil painting. The Aqua Journey exhibition (2012) brought together work made before surgery, during recovery, and after her return to the studio.

Jeffcoat named her latest studio on the island the Red Studio, after Matisse's The Red Studio. She regularly painted with the canvas laid flat on the floor, a method that led to shoulder injuries and surgeries. In the new studio, a pulley wall-hanging system allowed her to lower works to the floor or draw them up to the wall. The 2014 exhibition New Work from the Red Studio at Watson MacRae Gallery showed the artwork from the new working space.

=== Synesthesia and sound-color paintings ===
Jeffcoat's later work increasingly engaged synesthesia; for her, sounds, numbers, days, and smells each evoked color. She recognized the condition at age 24 in France, through conversations with Joan Mitchell — herself synesthetic — about the color of numbers and days of the week. Arguments between the two about which color a number or day was led Jeffcoat to understand that not everyone experienced this.

By 2014, Jeffcoat began consciously incorporating synesthesia into her paintings, starting with the Sound of the Osprey series, inspired by the cry of the osprey.

She later collaborated with composer and flutist Kat Epple on The Color of Sound; The Sound of Color, producing works including Gliding Over Treetops, Journey to Timbuktu I, Journey to Timbuktu II, and Expedition.

== Personal life ==
During her years in Mitchell's household at Vétheuil, Jeffcoat and Mitchell developed a close personal bond. The two adopted playful nicknames — Jeffcoat as "Vinnie" (for Vincent van Gogh) and Mitchell as "Thea" (for Theo van Gogh) — and Mitchell regarded Jeffcoat as a daughter of sorts, at one point planning a legal adoption that never took place.

In early 1979, Jeffcoat left La Tour with Riopelle. The two remained together in Canada until 1986. Bonnie Baxter, a printmaker who worked closely with Riopelle on his engravings, described Jeffcoat as his companion during this period. During this period, Jeffcoat hunted geese with Riopelle at Île aux Oies. In the 1999 documentary Riopelle, sans titre, 1999, collage, Riopelle's daughter Sylvie Gamet-Riopelle described Jeffcoat as "a wonderful woman" and associated her with a period when Riopelle had regained some health and enjoyment of life.

After leaving Riopelle, she lived in Francis Bacon's atelier next to Place des Vosges in Paris.

Jeffcoat's later life partner was Maureen Watson, owner of Watson MacRae Gallery on Sanibel Island. Watson and Jeffcoat met in Naples in 2001, later co-founded the Silver Tree School of Painting in Naples, and remained together until Jeffcoat's death in 2018. On Sanibel, the two lived in a cottage, a section of which was converted into Jeffcoat's studio.

== Collections and archives ==
Jeffcoat's work is held in the collections of the Brooklyn Museum and the Musée d'art contemporain de Montréal. The Brooklyn Museum holds Untitled (1992), a woodcut on paper contributed to Artist's Relief Portfolio for the Homeless: Relief Prints by 15 New York Artists, published by Rough House Press.

The Musée d'art contemporain de Montréal holds at least three paintings by Jeffcoat in its Lavalin collection: Frozen Lake (1982), Aux Roitelets (1981), and Jaseur des cèdres (1981).

Two untitled works on paper by Jeffcoat are held in the Joan Mitchell Foundation archive: Untitled, n.d., charcoal and conté crayon on paper, ARCH 5005-41, and Untitled, n.d., charcoal on paper, ARCH 5007-31.

== Death ==
Jeffcoat died in Fort Myers, Florida, on April 28, 2018, following a late-stage ovarian cancer diagnosis. She was 65.

== Posthumous representation ==
In 2023, Québec writer Martine Delvaux published Ça aurait pu être un film, a literary work centered on Hollis Jeffcoat, Joan Mitchell, and Jean-Paul Riopelle, drawing on archives, testimony, and published sources. The book arose from an unrealized idea for a film about Mitchell and Riopelle; Jeffcoat became the figure through whom Delvaux entered the story.

Jeffcoat was also represented on stage in Le Projet Riopelle, a 2023 theatrical production directed by Robert Lepage for Ex Machina, coproduced with Duceppe, the Fondation Jean Paul Riopelle, Le Diamant, and the Théâtre français du CNA, presented at the Théâtre Jean-Duceppe in Montréal from April 25 to June 11, 2023. The production was a dramatization inspired by real events, with fictionalized elements introduced for theatrical structure; actress Audrée Southière portrayed Hollis Jeffcoat among several characters.

== Exhibitions ==
=== Solo exhibitions ===
- 1981 — Theo Waddington Gallery, Montreal
- 1984 — Hollis Jeffcoat: peinture, Galerie Breteau, Paris (first Paris exhibition)
- 1986–87 — Recent Landscapes, Gallery of Fine Art, Edison Community College, Fort Myers, Florida
- 1989 — Landscapes, 1987–1989: Return to America, Achim Moeller Fine Art, New York
- 1990 — Lanier: Recent Works, President's Gallery, Brenau College, Gainesville, Georgia
- 1991 — Cleary, Gottlieb, Steen and Hamilton, New York
- 1993 — Bissell House Gallery, Lakeville, Connecticut
- 1994 — Recent Paintings, Frankel, Pariser and Rudder, New York
- 1995 — New Work, The Painting Center, New York
- 1996 — Tableaux et dessins récents, Bistro de Champlain, Sainte-Marguerite-du-Lac-Masson, Quebec
- 1998 — Artcore Gallery, Toronto
- 2000 — Eden Gallery, Naples, Florida
- 2000 — SoCo Gallery, Fort Myers, Florida
- 2001 — Artcore Gallery, Toronto
- 2001 — Hollis Jeffcoat, Gallery of Fine Art, Edison Community College, Fort Myers, Florida
- 2003 — Luminance, Maurice Arlos Fine Art, New York
- 2005 — Hollis Jeffcoat, C.A.S. Gallery, University of Miami, Coral Gables, Florida
- 2011 — Florida Abstracted, Watson MacRae Gallery, Sanibel, Florida
- 2012 — Recent Work: Aqua Journey, Watson MacRae Gallery, Sanibel, Florida
- 2012 — Hollis Jeffcoat: The Years in Paint, Watson MacRae Gallery, Sanibel, Florida
- 2014 — New Work from the Red Studio, Watson MacRae Gallery, Sanibel, Florida
- 2018 — Hollis Jeffcoat: My Life in Paint, Watson MacRae Gallery, Sanibel, Florida

=== Group exhibitions ===
- 1978 — FIAC, Grand Palais, Paris (with Galerie Jean Fournier)
- 1985–86 — Galerie Elca London, Montreal
- 1987 — Galerie Breteau 50th Anniversary, Galerie Breteau, Paris
- 1988 — Summer Selection: contemporanea, Achim Moeller Fine Art, New York
- 1992 — Laurentides, panorama pictural de 1899 à nos jours, Centre d'exposition du Vieux Palais, Saint-Jérôme, Quebec
- 1992 — Artist's Relief Portfolio for the Homeless: Relief Prints by 15 New York Artists, Michael Walls Gallery, New York
- 1992–93 — Hollis Jeffcoat / Deborah Masters, Marie Saint Pierre Gallerie, Montreal
- 1994 — Artist's Relief Portfolio for the Homeless: Relief Prints by 15 New York Artists, Metropolitan Museum of Art, Morgan Library, and Brooklyn Museum, New York
- 1997 — Artists of the Second District, Federal Reserve Bank of New York (Lower Manhattan Cultural Council program)
- 1998 — Hollis Jeffcoat and Eunice Ison, A Gallery SyZyGy, Fort Myers, Florida
- 2002 — Made in Florida: Abstraction, von Liebig Art Center, Naples, Florida
- 2008 — 475 KENT Lives, Queens Museum of Art at Bulova Corporate Center, Jackson Heights, New York
- 2008 — Color, Line, Form, Watson MacRae Gallery, Sanibel, Florida
- 2009 — Earth, Wind, Fire, Watson MacRae Gallery, Sanibel, Florida
- 2009 — Fluid Forms, Watson MacRae Gallery, Sanibel, Florida
- 2009 — Myth and Metaphor, Watson MacRae Gallery, Sanibel, Florida
- 2010 — Duet: Chaleff and Jeffcoat, Watson MacRae Gallery, Sanibel, Florida
- 2010 — Three Views, Watson MacRae Gallery, Sanibel, Florida
- 2011 — On Paper: Print, Paint, Draw, Watson MacRae Gallery, Sanibel, Florida
- 2013 — Punctum Contra Punctum II, Georgian National Gallery, Tbilisi; American edition at Sidney & Berne Davis Art Center, Fort Myers, Florida
- 2015 — New York Studio School Alumni Show, New York
- 2016 — The Color of Sound, The Sound of Color, Watson MacRae Gallery, Sanibel, Florida
- 2016 — Oh, Florida!, Watson MacRae Gallery, Sanibel, Florida
- 2018 — That Devil Paint: Hollis Jeffcoat and W. Darby Bannard, Watson MacRae Gallery, Sanibel, Florida
