= Hotel Monville =

Hotel in Montreal, Quebec, Canada

Coordinates: 45.50446°N 73.5625°W

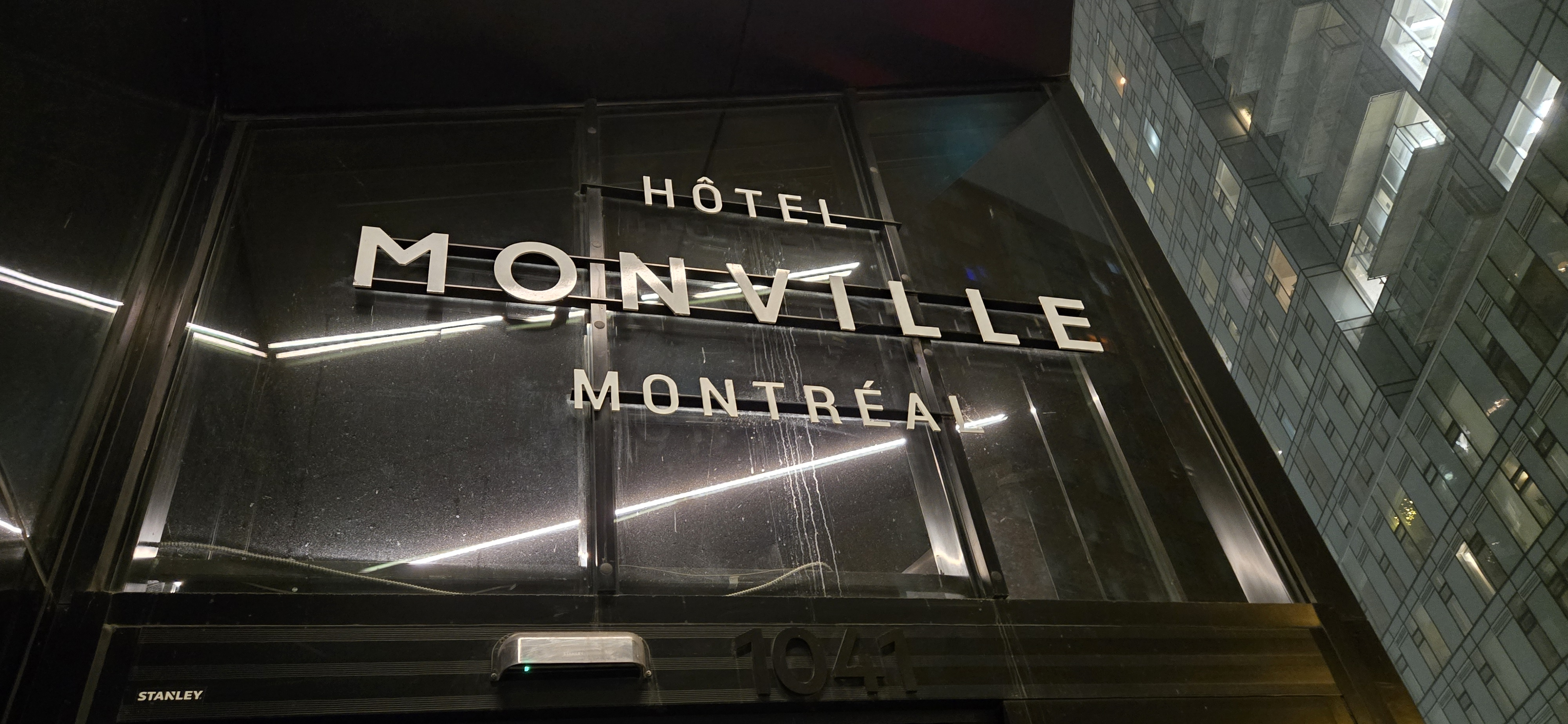
Entrance of the hotel

The Hôtel Monville is a hotel in downtown Montréal, Québec, Canada. Built by ACDF Architects and completed in March 2018. The hotel stands 76 meters (249 ft) tall with a view across downtown Montréal and has a total square footage of 14,900 square meters (160,382 square feet).

The hotel has 269-rooms, and differs from the surrounding buildings by its very prominent façade that stands out on the skyline because of its large windows with large boxes framing the windows in white of black. The monochromatic mosaic exterior has clean straight lined boxes that are black and white that give the windows depth, the white prefabricated concrete panels illuminate at night to make the building stand out.

The interior of the hotel continues the black and white monochromatic mosaic style from its exterior façade onto the floor, with large white columns and a black ceiling. The foyer is three stories tall with a large glass curtain wall, and large warm oak wood elements that surround certain rooms such as the bathroom, walkways, and the upstairs bar and lounge.

== Location ==
Hôtel Monville sits at 1041 Rue de Bleury, Montréal, Québec, Canada. The hotel is situated in downtown Montréal, surrounded by a few other hotels, a residential area, and the Montréal Convention Centre or Palais des congrès de Montréal. The hotel was established by the original owners of the old Montréal's Hotel Gault or Rue Sainte-Hélène.

== History ==
Hôtel Monville was constructed by Pomerleau and construction was finished and opened shortly after on March 15, 2018, and has been open since. The hotel won the ADISQ Award in the Accessible Tourism category, which it won because of its excellent design for people with disabilities having 27 rooms available, and makes the hotel very accessible for those with disabilities.

== Design ==
=== Architecture ===
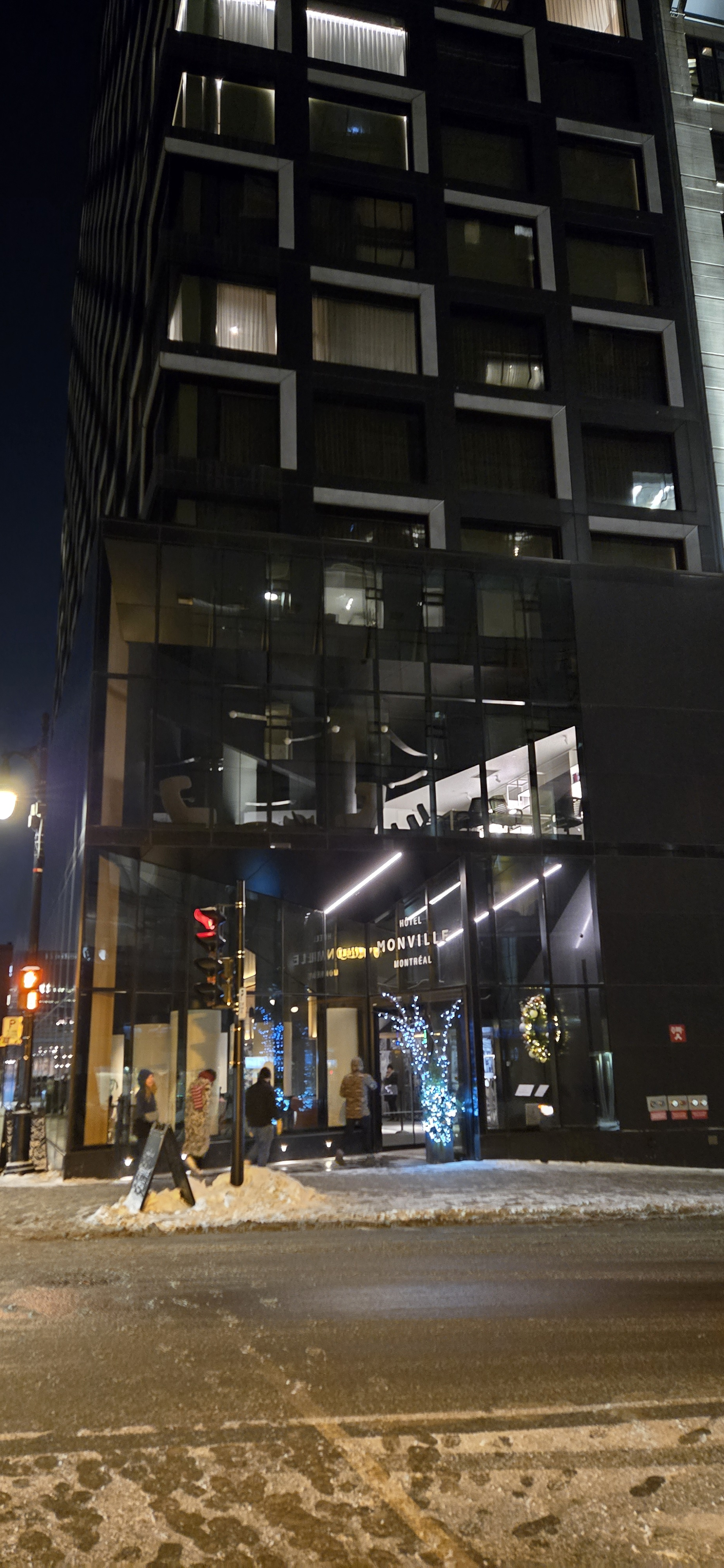

Hôtel Monville is a project of ACDF, built by Pomerleau construction company; the building finished construction in March 2018. The building has an overall size of 14,900 square meters (160,382 square feet), spread across the 18-storey hotel with 269 rooms.

The building is set back after the third story to match the buildings around it. Each window on the exterior is designated to a single suite inside. The façade is made up of square windows that are framed to create a black and white mosaic effect across the whole building. The black and white creates depth in the building as well the white prefabricated concrete panels illuminate at night to create the illusion of more depth. The exterior is complemented by its interior which follows the same monochromatic mosaic style. The overall design concept that the ACDF team wanted to be felt around the project was a warm and inviting space that was well built and well furnished to feel modern and cozy.

The foyer to the building, stands three stories tall with a glass curtain wall, and then takes the set back. The entrance is angled upwards then flattens out as you enter into the foyer. The foyer has a black and white mosaic flooring to match the building aesthetic, and a black ceiling. Three very large columns spread out through the entrance which are white with black tops and bottoms. The building features a bar, Gourmet Monville Café, sitting and meeting areas, library, and public outdoor spaces.

The interior of the building features a lot of warm oak wood, in the foyer large boxes can be seen which conceal walkways, part of the upstairs, bar, washroom, and a DJ booth. The guest rooms in the hotel have floor to ceiling windows, and the interior of the rooms follows the same monochromatic design as the exterior with white walls, lots of warm wood, grey carpets, and black doors and black accents.

=== Facilities and amenities ===
The Hôtel Monville has many different facilities and amenities that it offers such as a DJ booth, with a bar, large lounges with couches and marble countertops with brass detailing. The lobby includes a library, meeting rooms, a large banquet hall, and three large open rooftop terraces open to the public for events and for people to gather and have a drink. Every room offers robot service to the door to bring you towels and other goods. The walls in the rooms and lobbies include pictures in black and white of Montréal's past and its history. The hotel also offers a gym, dry cleaning, automated check in with key distributor, concierge services, and 24/7 front desk service.

=== Guest rooms ===
There are a total of 269 rooms in the hotel with 20 floors, and 54 rooms are made to be suites.
