= Toqué! =

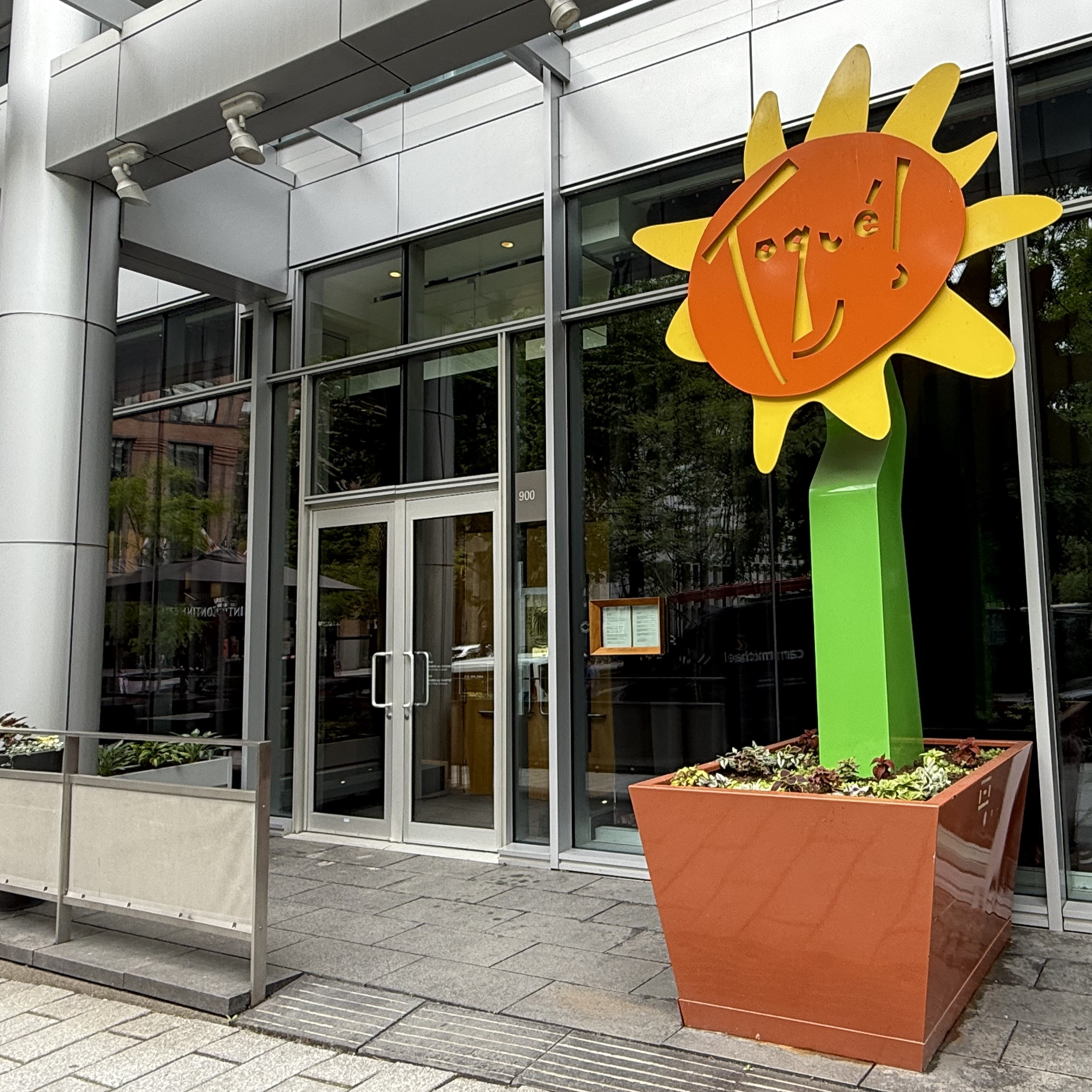
- Entrance to Toqué!

- Location of Toqué! in Montreal

Restaurant information
- Established: 1993
- Owners: Normand Laprise and Christine Lamarche
- Chef: Normand Laprise
- Food type: French cuisine, Canadian cuisine
- Rating: Recommended (Michelin Guide)
- Location: 900, place Jean-Paul-Riopelle, Montreal, Quebec, H2Z 2B2, Canada
- Coordinates: 45.503155°N 73.561562°W
- Seating capacity: 95
- Reservations: Yes
- Website: www.restaurant-toque.com/en

Toqué! is a restaurant in Montreal, Quebec, Canada. It is located at 900 Place Jean-Paul Riopelle in the CDP Capital Centre in the Quartier international neighbourhood of the Ville-Marie borough.

Toqué! offers French cuisine using locally sourced products.

== History ==
Toqué was founded in 1993 by Normand Laprise and Christine Lamarche. The original restaurant was located on Saint Denis Street, and could accommodate 55 people. Seeking a larger space, it moved to the newly built CDP Capital Centre in 2004.

In 2006, Toqué became a member of Relais & Châteaux. It also received the CAA/AAA Five Diamond Award.

== Recognition ==
In 2025, the business received a 'Recommended' designation in Quebec's inaugural Michelin Guide. Per the guide, a 'Recommended' selection "is the sign of a chef using quality ingredients that are well cooked; simply a good meal" and that the anonymous inspectors had found "the food to be above average, but not quite at [Michelin star] level." Chef-owner Normand Laprise expressed confusion over Michelin's description of the restaurant, stating that it did not accurately reflect the cuisine served.

=== Canada's 100 Best Restaurants Ranking ===
Toqué
Year	Rank	Change
2015	1	new
2016	1	Steady
2017	2	▼1
2018	2	Steady
2019	3	▼1
2020	6	▼3
2021	No List	
2022	▼ No Rank	
2023	45	▲ re-entry
2024	19	▲26
2025	67	▼48
2026	70	▼3

== Brasserie T! ==
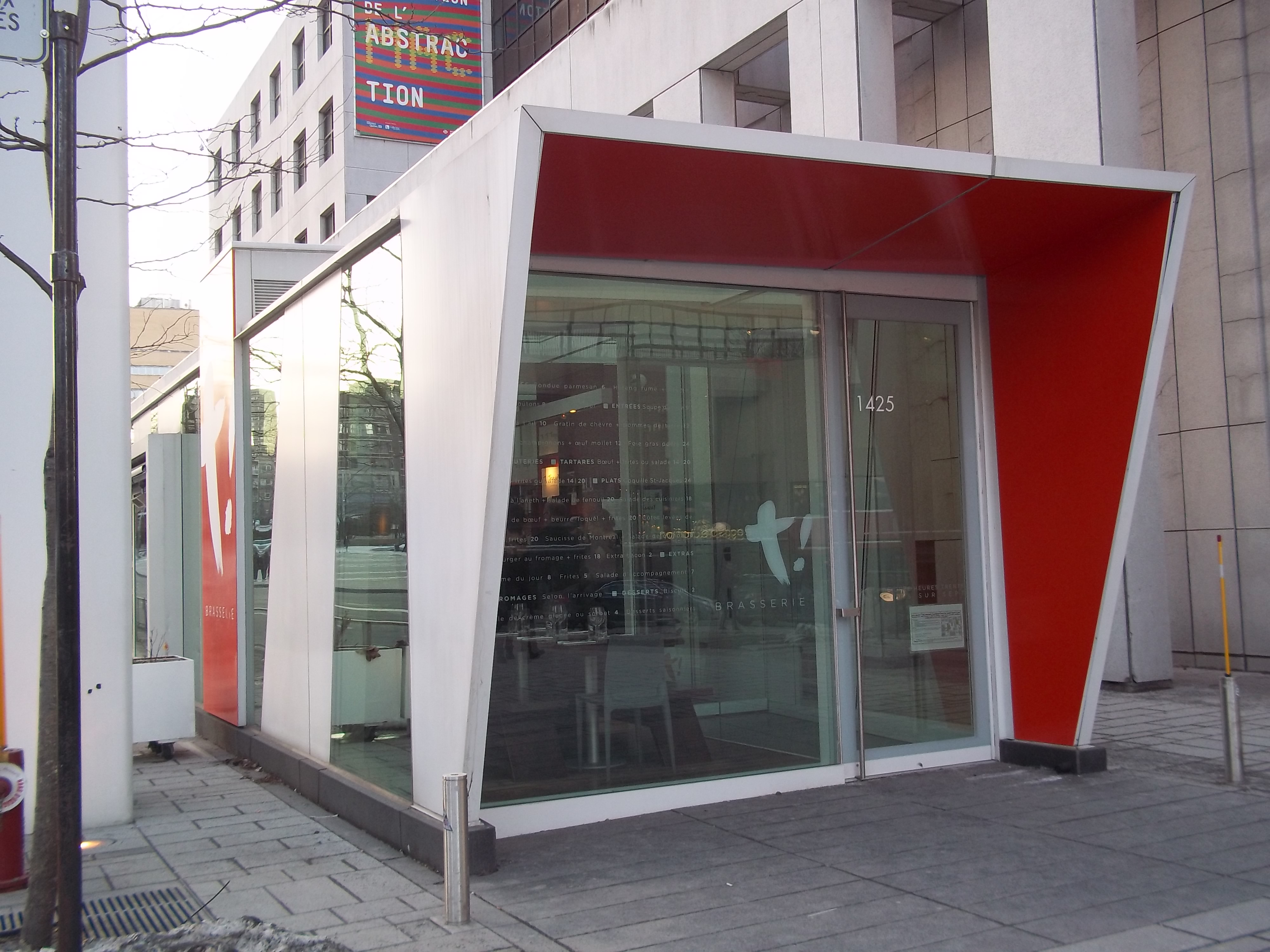
Brasserie T!

Brasserie T! was established by Laprise and Lamarche in 2010 on the Place des festivals in Montreal's Quartier des spectacles. It is owned by Laprise and Lamarche, and led by executive chef Charles-Antoine Crête. Brasserie T! is a sister restaurant to Toqué and offers brasserie-style food. It did not survive the Covid-19 Pandemic and is no longer operating
