= Air Montmagny =

Aircraft charter company in Canada

IATA	ICAO	Call sign
-	-	-
- Founded: 1954
- Hubs: Montmagny Airport
- Focus cities: Isle-aux-Grues Airport
- Fleet size: 5
- Headquarters: 640, boul. Taché Est, Montmagny, Quebec
- Website: http://www.airmontmagny.com

Air Montmagny, trading as Montmagny Air Service is an on-demand aircraft charter company based in Montmagny, Quebec, Canada. It operates passenger and cargo services.

== History ==
It was founded by Marius Lachaine as Montmagny Air Service in 1952 and acquired by Gilles Couillard in 1954. It was then sold to Gaston Gosselin in 1980 and definitely renamed Air Montmagny in 1993.

== Destinations ==
Air Montmagny serves five of the islands of the Isle-aux-Grues archipelago.

Since the nearby l'Isle-aux-Grues island has no ferry service during winter, Air Montmagny serves as the main link to the land. They carry passengers, goods, and also serves as "school bus" for students attending school in Montmagny.

Grosse-île island, also known as l'île de la Quarantaine is a regular user of Air Montmagny for employees and VIPs.

== Fleet ==
As of September 2019, Air Montmagny has the following aircraft registered with Transport Canada.

Air Montmagny
Aircraft	No. of aircraft	Variants	Notes
Britten-Norman BN-2 Islander	2	BN-2A-27, BN-2B-26	
Cessna 206	1	Cessna U206	The U206G with six seats.
Partenavia P.68	2	P. 68 Observer	
