= Bonnie Baxter =

Canadian artist

Bonnie Jean Baxter (born 1946) is an American artist (born in Texarkana, Texas). She studied art in Illinois (1965–1967) and Michigan (1967–1969) and came to Montreal, Canada, with her artist husband, Pierre Lemieux, in 1970. She has lived in Canada since 1972. She was one of the first members of the Atelier de l’Île and created Atelier Le Scarabée. She printed for other Canadian artists such as Canadian artist Jean-Paul Riopelle and René Derouin. Baxter is known for her artworks that combine animal and human forms.

In 2017 she was awarded the prix Charles-Biddle. She also received the Prix Télé-Québec 2019 as part of the 11e BIECTR and the Prix les grand Soleils (a Lifetime achievement award) in 2018. In 2019 she was the subject of a retrospective exhibition at the Musée d’art contemporain des Laurentides. Her work has been presented in Canada and internationally including solo exhibitions at Musée d'art contemporain des Laurentides (MACLAU), the Bob Rauschenberg Gallery in Florida and Centre Clark in Montréal, Quebec.

== Collections ==
Baxter's work is included in the collection of the Musée national des beaux-arts du Québec, Bonnie Baxter is represented by the gallery Blouin | Division in Montréal Québec. and the Istanbul Museum of Graphic Arts.
