= Jean-Paul Riopelle =

Canadian painter and sculptor (1923–2002)

- Born: October 7, 1923; Montreal, Quebec, Canada
- Died: March 12, 2002 (aged 78); Saint-Antoine-de-l'Isle-aux-Grues, Quebec, Canada
- Known for: Painter, sculptor, lithographer
- Movement: Les Automatistes; Lyrical abstraction; Tachisme
- Partners: Françoise Lespérance (m. 1946; div. 1953): Joan Mitchell (1959–1979); Hollis Jeffcoat (c. 1979–1986); Huguette Vachon (c. 1986–2002)
- Awards: Order of Canada (Companion); National Order of Quebec (Grand Officer); Guggenheim International Award exhibition in 1958

Jean-Paul Riopelle, CC GOQ RCA (October 7, 1923 – March 12, 2002) was a Canadian painter and sculptor from Quebec. He had one of the longest and most important international careers of the sixteen signatories of the Refus Global, the 1948 manifesto that announced the Quebecois artistic community's refusal of clericalism and provincialism. He is best known for his abstract painting style, in particular his "mosaic" works of the 1950s when he famously abandoned the paintbrush, using only a palette knife to apply paint to canvas, giving his works a distinctive sculptural quality. He became the first Canadian painter since James Wilson Morrice to attain widespread international recognition and high praise, both during his career and after his death. He was a leading artist of French Lyrical Abstraction.

== Biography ==
Born in Montreal, Riopelle began drawing lessons in 1933 and continued through 1938. His parents encouraged his interest in art and allowed the young Riopelle to take classes with Henri Bisson (1900–1973), who taught drawing and painting out of his home on weekends. Bisson was a well-known artist and educator in Montreal at the time and was responsible for a number of public monuments that still exist today. Riopelle studied engineering, architecture and photography at the École polytechnique de Montréal in 1941. In 1942, he enrolled at the École des beaux-arts de Montréal but shifted his studies to the less academic École du meuble, graduating in 1945.

Jean-Paul Riopelle, 1948, Untitled (sans titre), oil on canvas, 97.5 x 130 cm (38 3/8 x 51¼ in.)

He studied under Paul-Émile Borduas in the 1940s and was a member of Les Automatistes, a group of Montreal artists who were interested in Surrealist techniques, particularly automatic drawing with its embrace of the imagination and creativity born out of the unconscious mind. Breaking with traditional conventions in 1945 after reading André Breton's Le Surréalisme et la Peinture, he began experimenting with non-objective (or non-representational) painting. He was one of the signers of the Refus global manifesto. In 1947, Riopelle moved to Paris and continued his career as an artist, where, after a brief association with the surrealists (he was the only Canadian to exhibit with them at the landmark exhibition International Exhibition of Surrealism at Galerie Maeght in 1947) and to sign Breton's manifesto the Rupture inaugurale) he capitalized on his image as a "wild Canadian". His first solo exhibition took place in 1949 at the Surrealist meeting place, Galerie La Dragonne (later known as the Galerie Nina Dausset) in Paris. In 1953, he signed with Pierre Loeb of Galerie Pierre which led to his work being included in the Guggenheim exhibition Younger European Artists the same year.

Riopelle married Françoise Lespérance in 1946; the couple had two daughters but separated in 1953. In 1959, he began a relationship with the American painter Joan Mitchell. Living together throughout the 1960s, they kept separate homes and studios near Giverny, where Monet had lived. They influenced one another greatly, as much intellectually as artistically, a facet of their art which has been explored by an exhibition at the Art Gallery of Ontario in 2018. Their association was a stormy one, fuelled by alcohol, which ended in 1979. After the end of his relationship with Mitchell, Riopelle was in a long-term relationship with the American painter Hollis Jeffcoat, with whom he lived in France and Quebec until 1986. In an official National Film Board retrospective on Riopelle films, curator Marc St-Pierre describes Jeffcoat as Riopelle's companion and identifies her as one of the people working with him and ceramist Hans Spinner during the filming of Riopelle. Riopelle's daughter Sylvie Riopelle-Gamet later spoke warmly of Jeffcoat in the 1999 documentary Riopelle, sans titre, 1999, collage, associating her with a period when Riopelle had regained some health and enjoyment of life. From about 1986 until his death, his companion was Huguette Vachon.

His 1992 painting Hommage à Rosa Luxemburg is Riopelle's tribute to Mitchell, who died that year, and is regarded as a high point of his later work.

== Work ==
Riopelle's style in the 1940s changed quickly from Surrealism to Lyrical Abstraction (related to abstract expressionism), in which he used myriad tumultuous cubes and triangles of multicolored elements, facetted with a palette knife, spatula, or trowel, on often large canvases to create an overall sense of movement.

The presence of long filaments of paint in his painting from 1948 through the early 1950s has often been seen as resulting from a dripping technique like that of Jackson Pollock. Rather, the creation of such effects came from the act of throwing, with a palette knife or brush or directly from the paint tube, large quantities of paint onto the stretched canvas (positioned vertically).

Riopelle's voluminous impasto became just as important as color. His oil painting technique allowed him to paint thick layers, producing peaks and troughs as copious amounts of paint were applied to the surface of the canvas. Riopelle, though, claimed that the heavy impasto was unintentional: "When I begin a painting," he said, "I always hope to complete it in a few strokes, starting with the first colours I daub down anywhere and anyhow. But it never works, so I add more, without realizing it. I have never wanted to paint thickly, paint tubes are much too expensive. But one way or another, the painting has to be done. When I learn how to paint better, I will paint less thickly." This aspect of the "unintentional" is in keeping with Riopelle's interest in Surrealism and using "absolute chance" to create art.

Jean-Paul Riopelle, 1951, Untitled, oil on canvas, 54 x 64.7 cm (21 1/4 x 25 1/2 in.), private collection

When Riopelle started painting, he would attempt to finish the work in one session, preparing all the color he needed beforehand: "I would even go as far to say—obviously I don't use a palette, but the idea of a palette or a selection of colors that is not mine makes me uncomfortable, because when I work, I can't waste my time searching for them. It has to work right away."

A third element, range of gloss, in addition to color and volume, plays a crucial role in Riopelle's oil paintings. Paints are juxtaposed so that light is reflected off the surface not just in different directions but with varying intensity, depending on the naturally occurring gloss finish (he did not varnish his paintings). These three elements; color, volume, and range of gloss, would form the basis of his oil painting technique throughout his long and prolific career.

Riopelle received an Honorable Mention at the 1952 São Paulo Art Biennial. In 1953, he showed at the Younger European Painters exhibition at the Solomon R. Guggenheim Museum in New York City. The following year Riopelle began exhibiting at the Pierre Matisse Gallery in New York. In 1954, works by Riopelle, along with those of B. C. Binning and Paul-Émile Borduas represented Canada at the Venice Biennale. He was the sole artist representing Canada at the 1962 Venice Biennale in an exhibit curated by Charles Comfort.

Riopelle received an Honorable Mention at the Guggenheim Museum's Guggenheim International Award exhibition in 1958 and a major retrospective of his work was held at the Kölnischer Kunstverein, Cologne. Subsequent retrospectives of Riopelle's work were held at the National Gallery of Canada in 1963, a smaller exhibition at the Musée du Québec in 1967, at the Fondation Maeght (Saint Paul-de-Vence, France) in 1971, and at the Musée d’Art Moderne de la Ville de Paris in 1972. He was made a member of the Royal Canadian Academy of Arts.

Jean-Paul Riopelle, 1953, Untitled, oil on canvas, 114 x 145 cm (44.9 by 57 in.), Museum of Fine Arts of Rennes, France

After diversifying his means of expression during the 1960s (turning to ink on paper, watercolours, lithography, collage and oils), he experimented with sculptural installations, including a fountain in Montreal's Olympic Stadium, called La joute. In 1972, he returned to Québec and built a studio at Sainte-Marguerite-du-Lac-Masson. He discovered the glacial landscapes of the Far North, inspiring in the black and white Icebergs series of 1977 and 1978. A large retrospective of Riopelle's work was held in 1981 at the Musée National d'Art Moderne, Centre Georges Pompidou, in Paris, then traveled to the Musée national des beaux-arts du Québec and Musée d'art contemporain de Montréal (1981-1982). This exhibit also travelled to the Museo de Arte Moderno in Mexico City, the Museo de Arte Contemporáneo de Caracas, Venezuela in Caracas.

While expressing more representational subject matter in the 1980s, he abandoned traditional painting methods in favor of aerosol spray cans. In 1981, he became the first signatory of the Refus Global manifesto to be awarded the prestigious Prix Paul-Émile-Borduas. His painting Hommage à Rosa Luxemburg (1992, Musée national des beaux-arts du Québec), done after her death, is a tribute to love and to life, to the American painter Joan Mitchell who was his companion for 25 years and is a narrative sequence of 30 tableaux, integrated into a triptych measuring more than 40 meters in length. In 1974, he began to travel to the Quebec Laurentians, to a studio and home at Ste. Marguerite he designed and had built and Sainte-Cyr-en-Arthies, France. He lived his last years at Isle-aux-Grues, an isolated island situated in the St. Lawrence River.

Riopelle was arguably one of the most important Canadian artists of the 20th century, establishing his reputation in the burgeoning postwar art scene of Paris, where his entourage included André Breton, Sam Francis and Samuel Beckett. Riopelle produced over six thousand works (of which he produced more than two thousand paintings) during the course of his lifetime.

=== Art market ===
On May 24, 2017, Riopelle's painting Vent du nord sold at the Heffel Fine Art Auction House spring auction for $7,438,750 (CAD) (including buyer's premium), the second-highest price to date for a Canadian work of art. Heffel holds the current record for Riopelle's work.

== Relocation of La Joute ==
Riopelle's 1969 work La Joute was originally located in the Parc Olympique, in the Hochelaga-Maisonneuve district of Montreal. Despite popular belief, the work is not an homage to hockey (in French a "joute de hockey," wherein the wrongful attribution lies), but is actually referring to the game "capture the flag". A menagerie of animals and mythological figures are caught up in the game, encircling a central structure that Riopelle called the "Tower of Life". Its relocation to the La Place Jean-Paul-Riopelle during the redevelopment of the Quartier international de Montréal in 2003 provoked controversy and outrage from residents of Hochelaga-Maisonneuve, who claimed that moving it from the Parc Olympique deprived it of the context required for its full meaning as an homage to sport.

Those who supported the move, including the Quebec government, Riopelle's heirs, and the artwork's owner the Musée d'art contemporain de Montréal, argued that moving it would allow a proper homage to Riopelle, and that it would allow the work to be more widely seen and exhibited as the artist intended, whereas its previous location had been inaccessible and had not included the fountain or fire elements Riopelle designed. In addition, the artist felt that the commercial venues around Parc Olympic trivialized the art.

== Theft and destruction of La Défaite ==
On August 1, 2011, Riopelle's sculpture La Défaite was stolen from its pedestal in Esterel, Quebec, where it had been on display since 1963. The sculpture was found the next day in a wooded area, broken into four pieces.

== Legacy ==
Riopelle represented Canada at the 1962 Venice Biennale. In 1969, he was made a Companion of the Order of Canada, and began to spend more time in Canada. He was specially recognized by UNESCO for his work. One of his largest compositions, Point de rencontre, was originally intended for the Toronto airport, but is at Rideau Hall on loan from France's Centre national des arts plastiques until 2024. In 1988, he was made an Officer of the National Order of Quebec and was promoted to Grand Officer in 1994. In 2000, Riopelle was inducted into Canada's Walk of Fame.

In June 2006, the Montreal Museum of Fine Arts organized a retrospective exhibition which was presented at the State Hermitage Museum in Saint Petersburg, Russia and the Musée Cantini in Marseilles, France. The Montreal Museum of Fine Arts has a number of his works, spanning his entire career, in their permanent collection. In 2020, his indigenously inspired paintings were gathered in the travelling exhibition Riopelle: The Call of Northern Landscapes and Indigenous Cultures by the Montreal Museum of Fine Arts. The exhibition explores Riopelle's interest in non-Western art, as sparked by his "friend and collector Georges Duthuit and the writings of anthropologists and ethnologists, such as Marius Barbeau, Jean Malaurie and Claude Lévi-Strauss". In 2021, the Musée national des beaux-arts du Québec, Quebec City announced that it will build a pavilion dedicated to Riopelle's work, "Espace Riopelle".

A set of postage stamps depicting portions of Riopelle's painting L'Hommage à Rosa Luxemburg was issued by Canada Post on October 7, 2003.

In 2023, on Riopelle's 100th birthday, a major retrospective Riopelle: Crossroads in Time, was organized by the National Gallery of Canada. The Musée National d'Art Moderne at the Centre Pompidou in Paris hosted a major exhibition of Riopelle's work and the Royal Canadian Mint issued two special commemorative gold coins featuring Riopelle imagery.

== Works ==
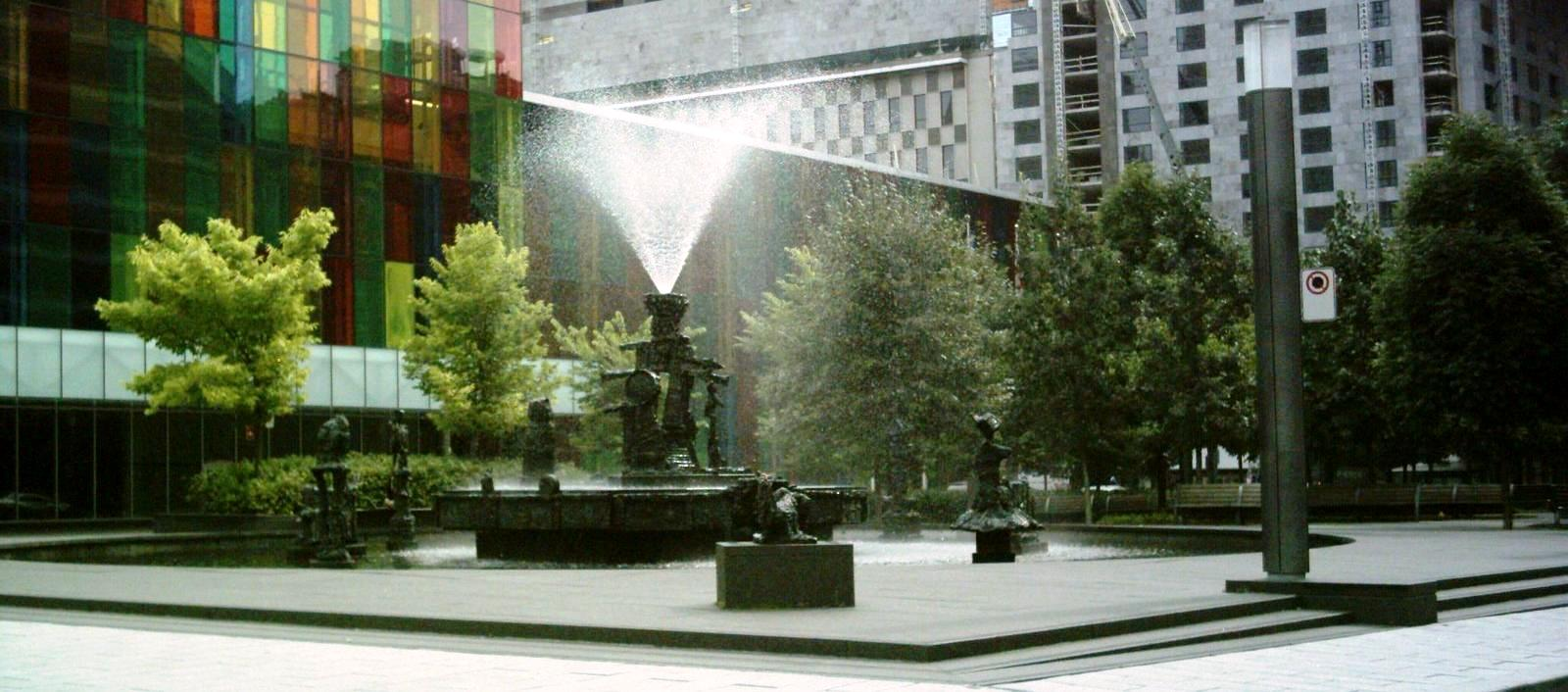
La Place Jean-Paul-Riopelle, Montreal, Quebec

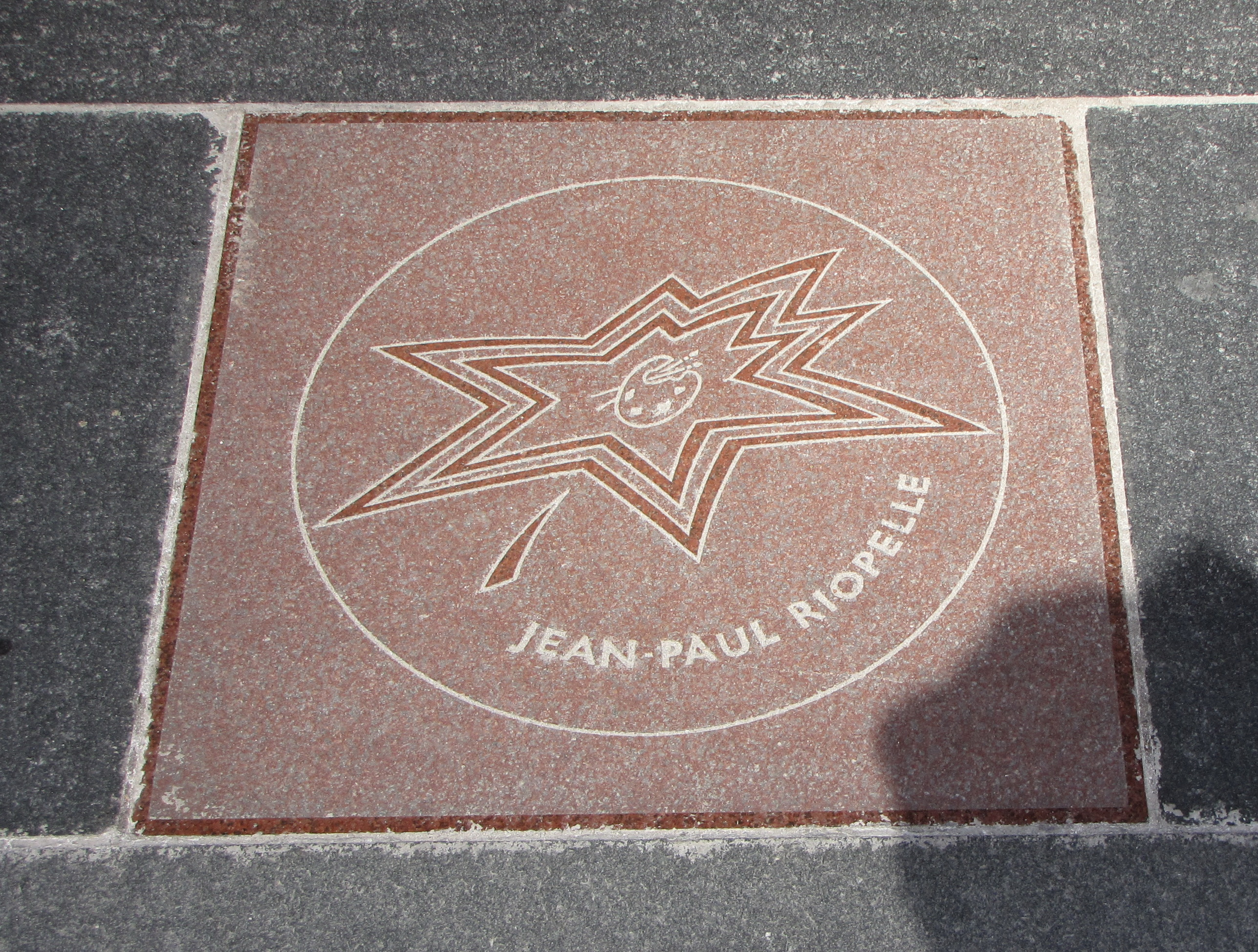
Jean-Paul Riopelle's star on Canada's Walk of Fame

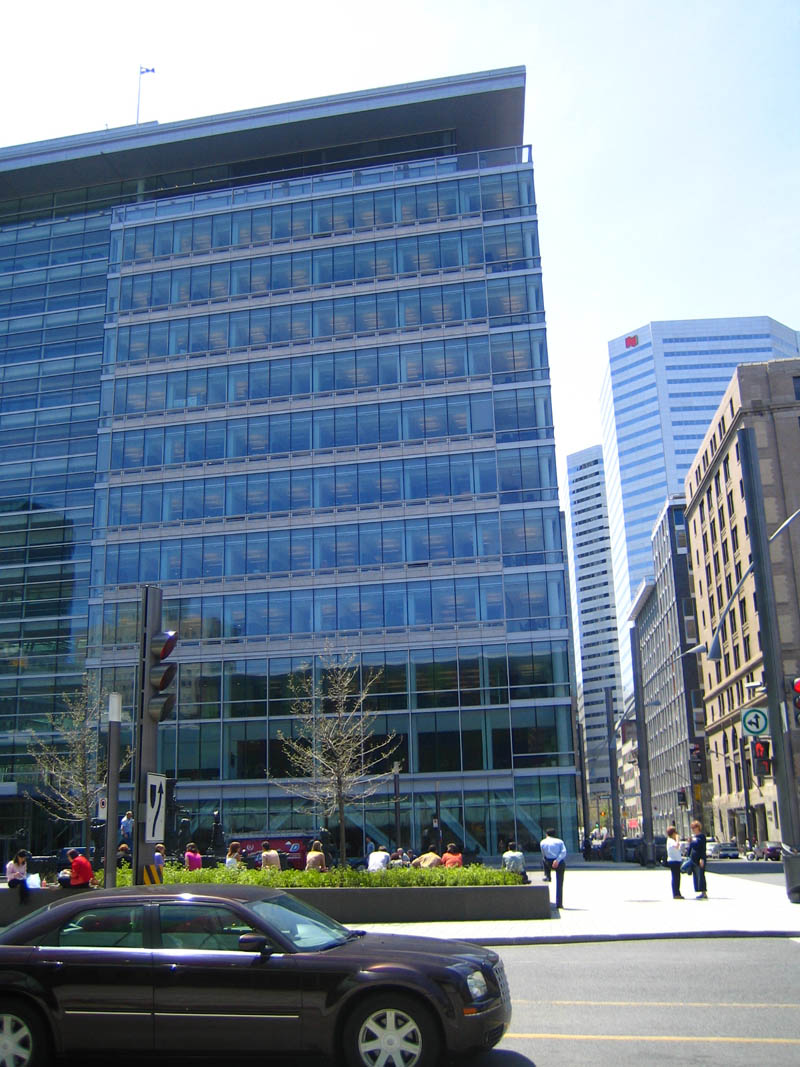
La Place Jean-Paul Riopelle in Quartier international de Montréal, Quebec

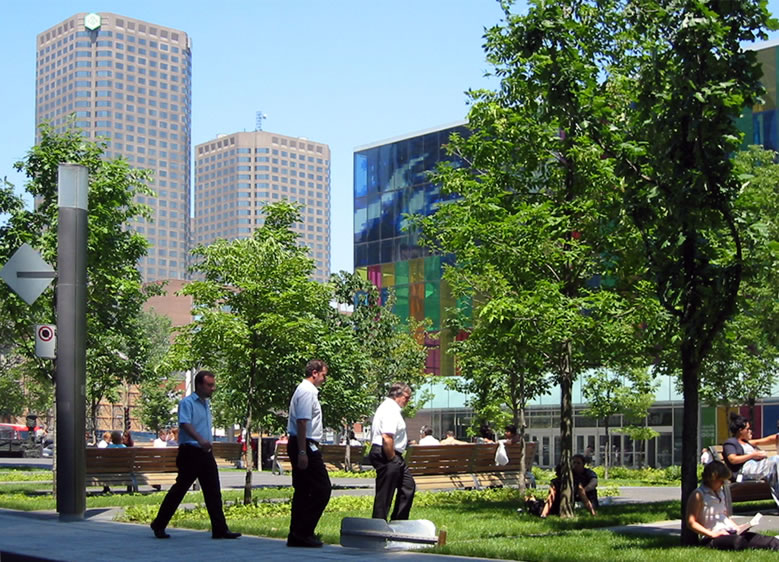
La Place Jean-Paul Riopelle in Quartier international de Montréal, Quebec

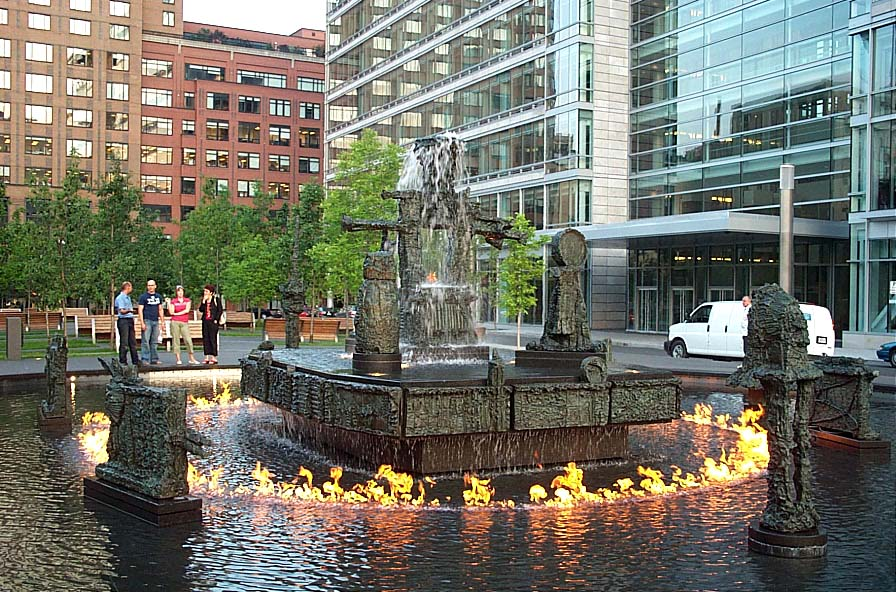
La Joute, by Jean-Paul Riopelle, in the Place Jean-Paul-Riopelle, Montreal, Quebec
