= Quartier international de Montréal =

- Neighbourhood
- Seal

- Location of Quartier international in Montreal
- Coordinates: 45°30′04″N 73°33′40″W
- Country: Canada
- Province: Quebec
- City: Montreal
- Borough: Ville-Marie
- Postal Code: H2Y, H2Z, H3B, H3C, H4Z
- Area codes: 514, 438

The Quartier international de Montréal (French pronunciation: [kaʁtje ɛ̃tɛʁnɑsjɔnal də mɔ̃ʁeal]; QIM) or Montreal's International District is a district of the Ville-Marie borough in the city's downtown core of Montreal, Quebec, Canada. It is roughly bordered by René Lévesque Boulevard to the north, Notre-Dame Street to the south, De Bleury/Saint-Pierre Street to the east and Robert Bourassa Boulevard to the west. The Palais des congrès building lying just east of the district is also usually comprised in it. Constructed dispersedly between 1965 and 1985 in place of older colonial housing blocks, the district underwent major urban renewal as a central business district in 2000–2003.

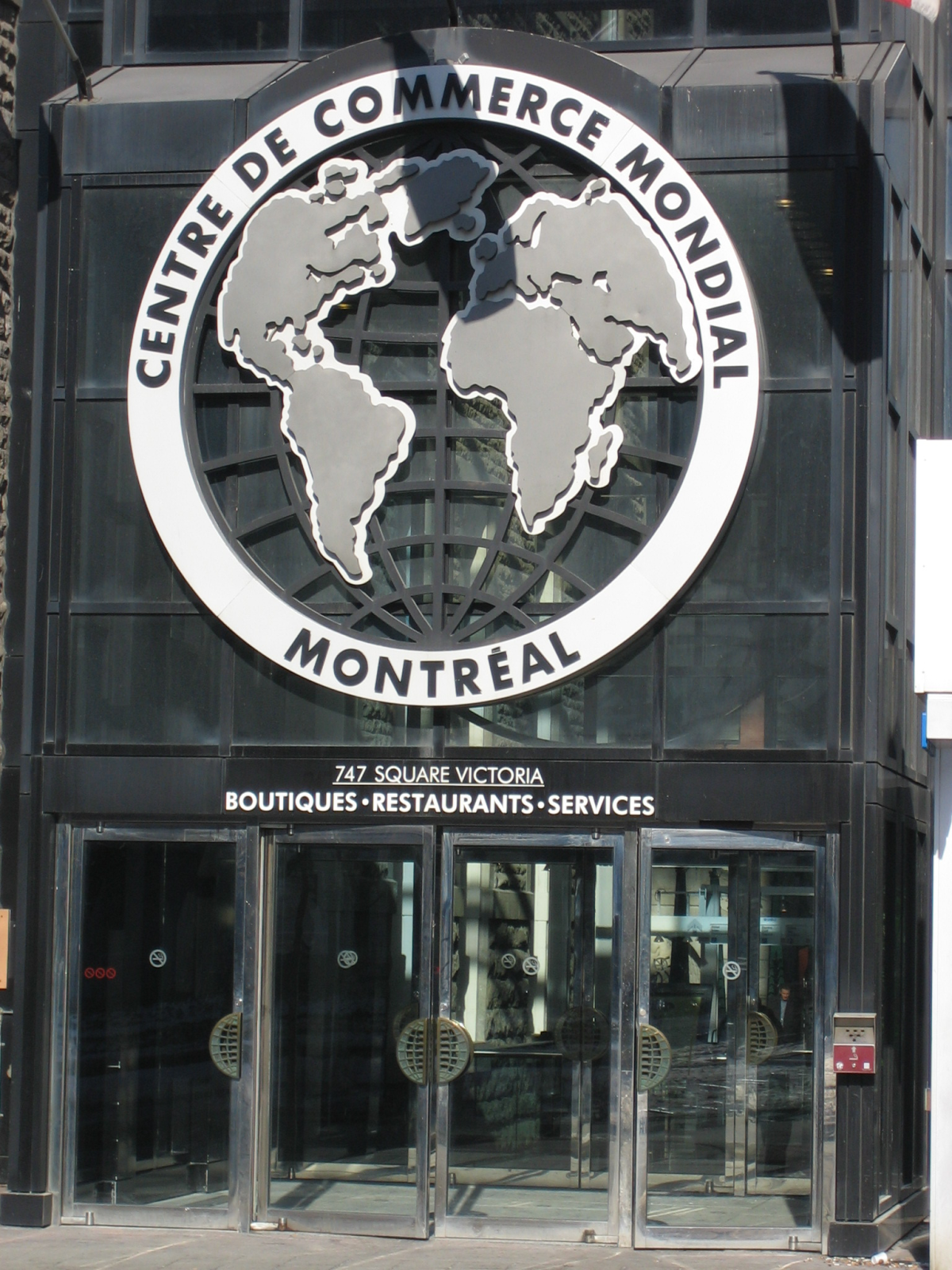
The Montreal World Trade Centre west entrance on Victoria Square.

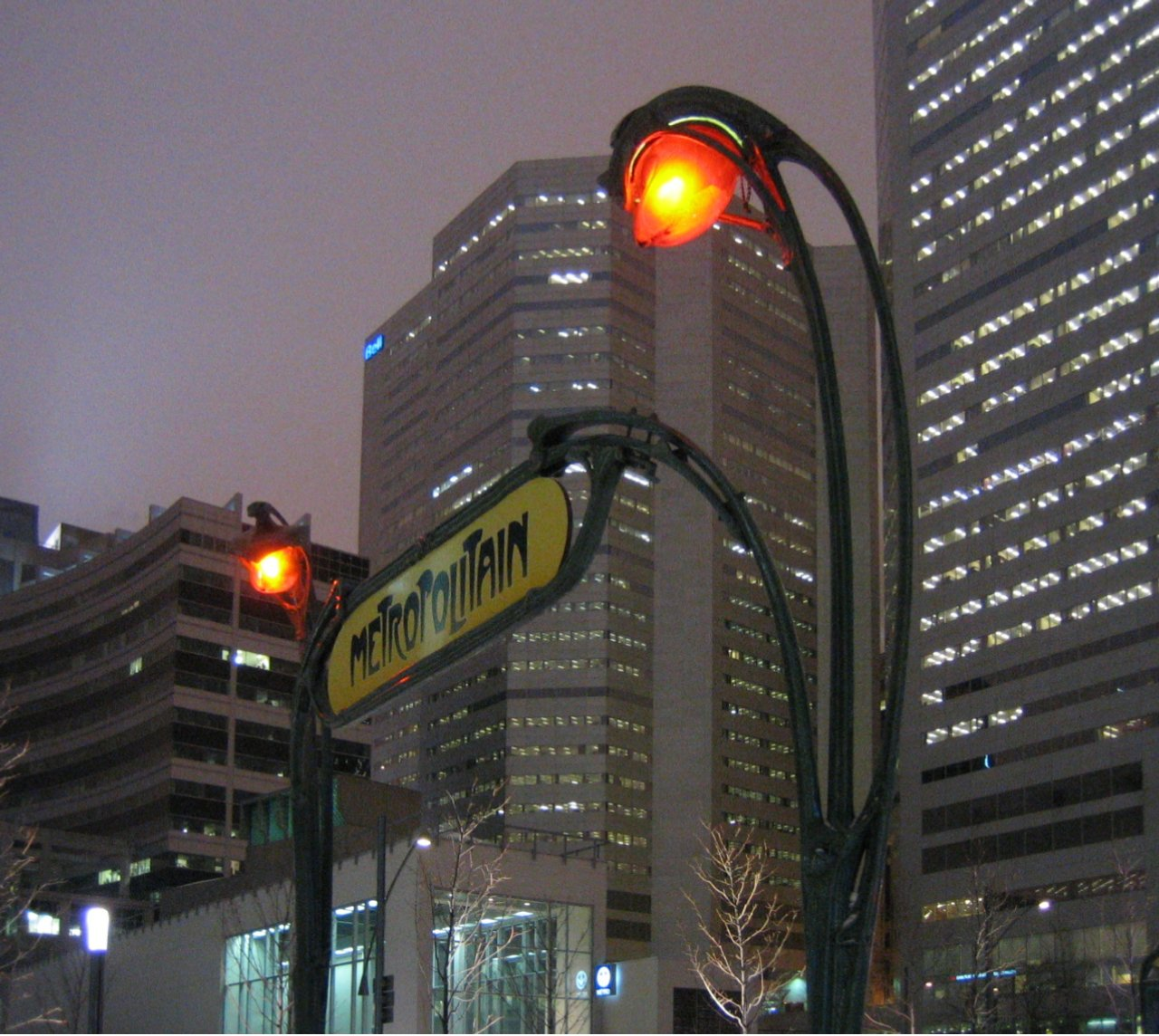
Complexe Maisonneuve and the back of Place de la Cité internationale, seen at night from Victoria Square.

== Purpose ==
The main purpose of the project was to restore the continuity of Montreal's downtown, broken by the trench of the Ville-Marie Expressway since the 1960s, and thus to bridge the following areas:

- The existing downtown business district centred on Place Ville Marie (northwest);
- The Saint Laurent Boulevard/Sainte Catherine Street entertainment district and Chinatown (northeast);
- The historic Old Montreal district (southeast);
- The Cité du Multimédia high-tech development district (southwest).

Other goals included the beautification of the built environment, creation of elegant city squares, showcase of Quebec design and public art, and stimulation of world-class real estate development at the heart of Montreal.

The completed area of 27 hectares (0.27 square kilometres or nearly 67 acres), 30% of which are in the public domain, spreads on an east–west axis above the Ville-Marie Expressway tunnels. It is bounded by Saint Urbain Street to the east, Saint Antoine Street to the south, University Street to the west and Viger Avenue to the north (plus Saint Jacques Street between McGill Street and University Street). The area is serviced by three stations on the Orange Line of the Montreal Metro and large portions of the underground city.

== Components ==
The QIM itself has five main components, from east to west:

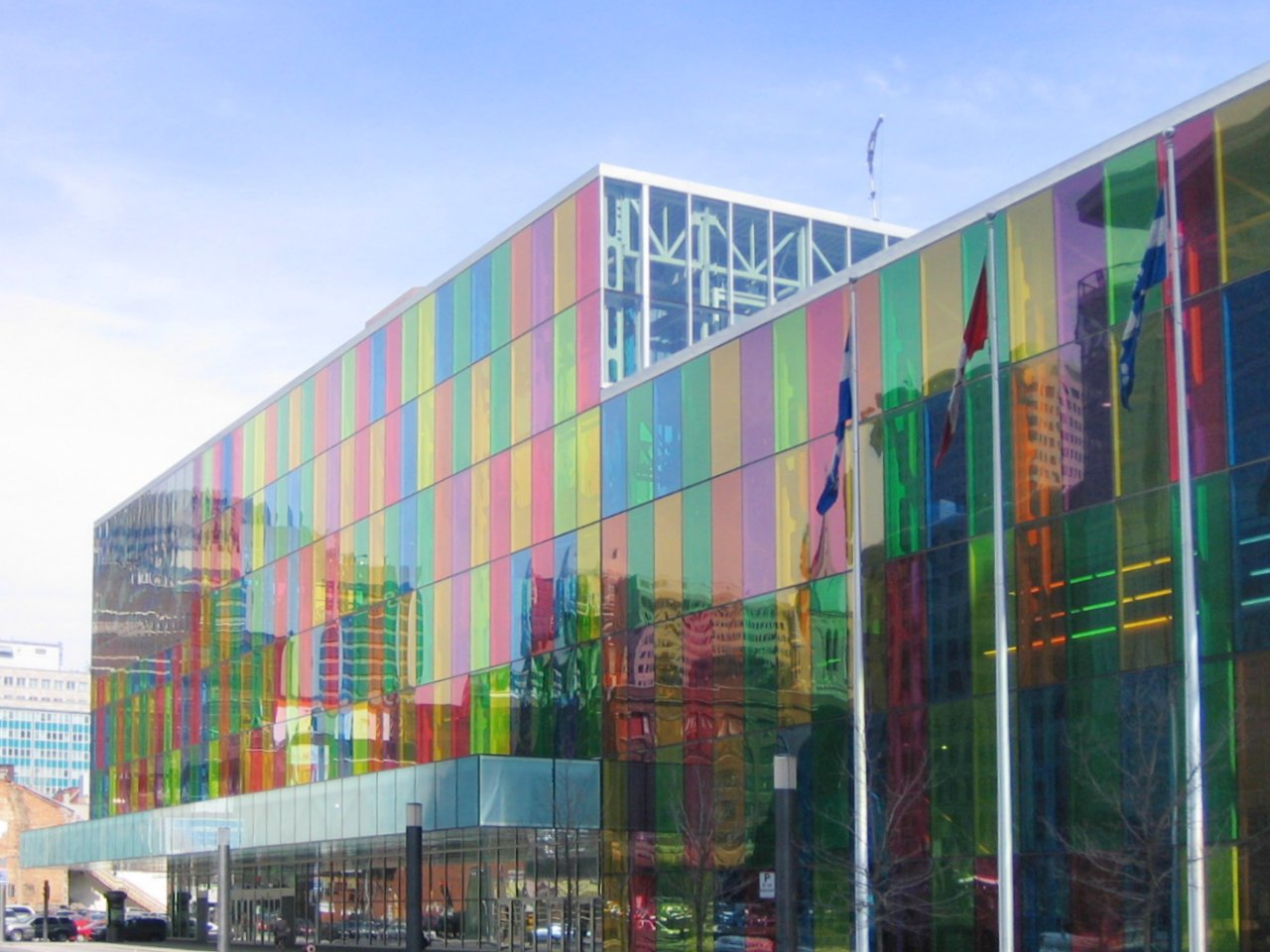
Palais des congrès, seen from Place Jean-Paul Riopelle.

=== Palais des congrès ===
The Palais des congrès de Montréal (Montreal Convention Centre), the first building built over the expressway trench, was extended towards the west in the same manner, doubling in area while covering the first half of the western trench. The extension followed a similar design than the 1980s original, but with less concrete and more coloured glass, giving it a lighter appearance. The design, which included multicoloured panels and bright pink "tree" sculptures in the lobby, did not please everyone but is generally said to integrate well with the area. This section is connected to the Place-d'Armes Metro station.

=== Place Jean-Paul Riopelle ===
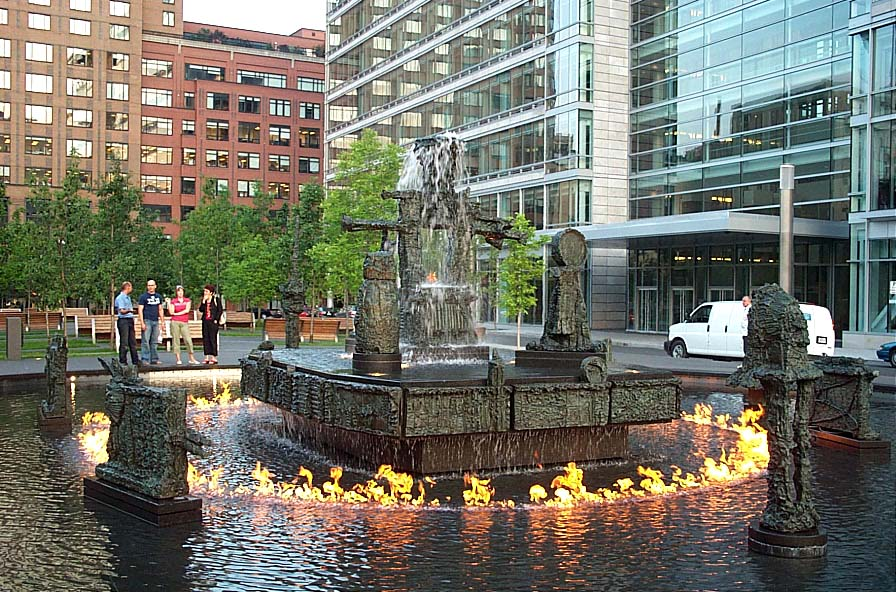
La Joute on Place Jean-Paul Riopelle.

The public square built over the trench at the same time as the Centre CDP Capital was named Place Jean-Paul Riopelle in honour of Quebec artist Jean-Paul Riopelle who died in 2002. His fountain sculpture La Joute was then moved to the square from the Parc Olympique in the district of Hochelaga-Maisonneuve.

=== Édifice Jacques-Parizeau ===
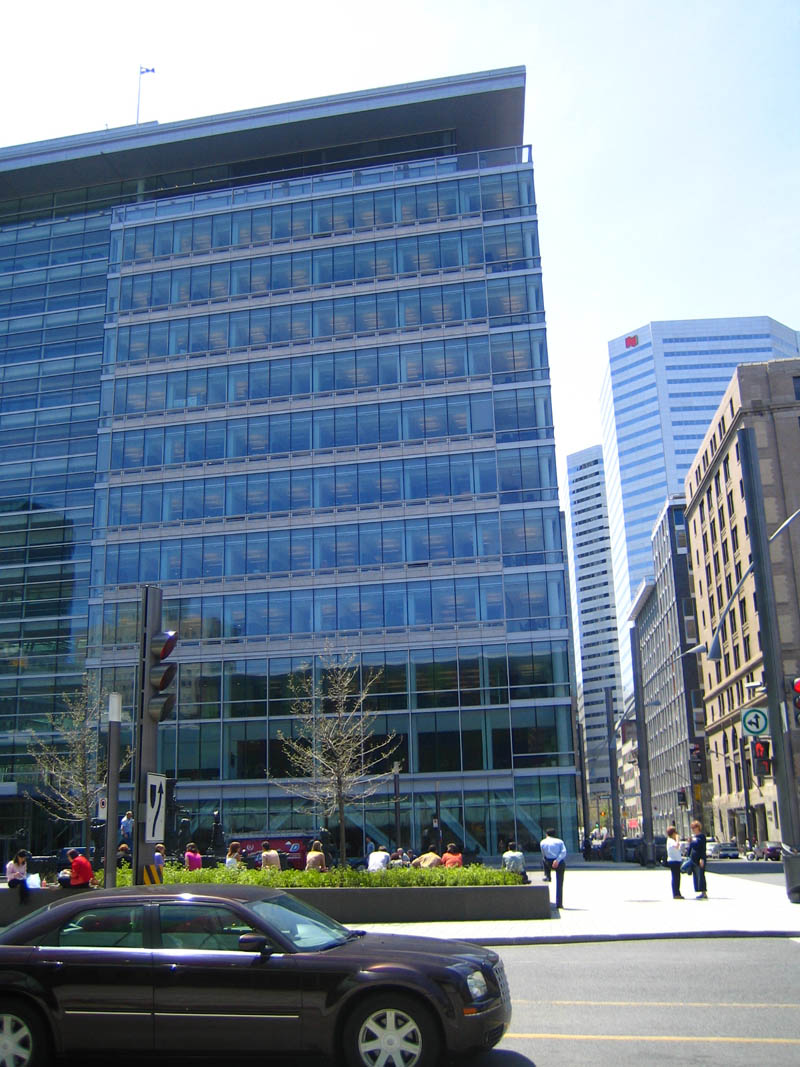
Centre CDP Capital, seen from Place Jean-Paul Riopelle.

The Édifice Jacques-Parizeau is the Montreal regional office of the Caisse de dépôt et placement du Québec, the main investment arm of the Quebec government. Entirely suspended over the trench, the 13-storey building was the "enabler" and is now the centrepiece of the district, stretching between Jean-Paul Riopelle and Victoria squares. Despite its strong architectural qualities, construction was marked by opposition to the huge cost overruns of an already very expensive structure, at the same time as the CDPQ was losing taxpayers' money from questionable investments made during the dot-com bubble.

The building integrates a new W boutique hotel at the west end on Victoria Square, as well as headquarters of two international organisations: International Council of Graphic Design Associations (Icograda) and the International Council of Societies of Industries Design (Icsid).

=== Victoria Square ===
Once an empty space crossed diagonally by Beaver Hall and McGill streets, Victoria Square was restored to its original configuration, that of a tree-lined square between parallel avenues. Trees and benches were added, the statue of Queen Victoria was reinstated, and special care was given to Hector Guimard's Art Nouveau outdoor entrance to the Square-Victoria-OACI Metro station. The square is now fronted on the east by the Centre CDP Capital and the Montreal World Trade Centre, to the west by Tour de la Bourse and Place de la Cité internationale, to the north by the Altoria/Aimia Tower, and to the south by the Quebecor building, its outdated façade fully re-designed for the occasion.

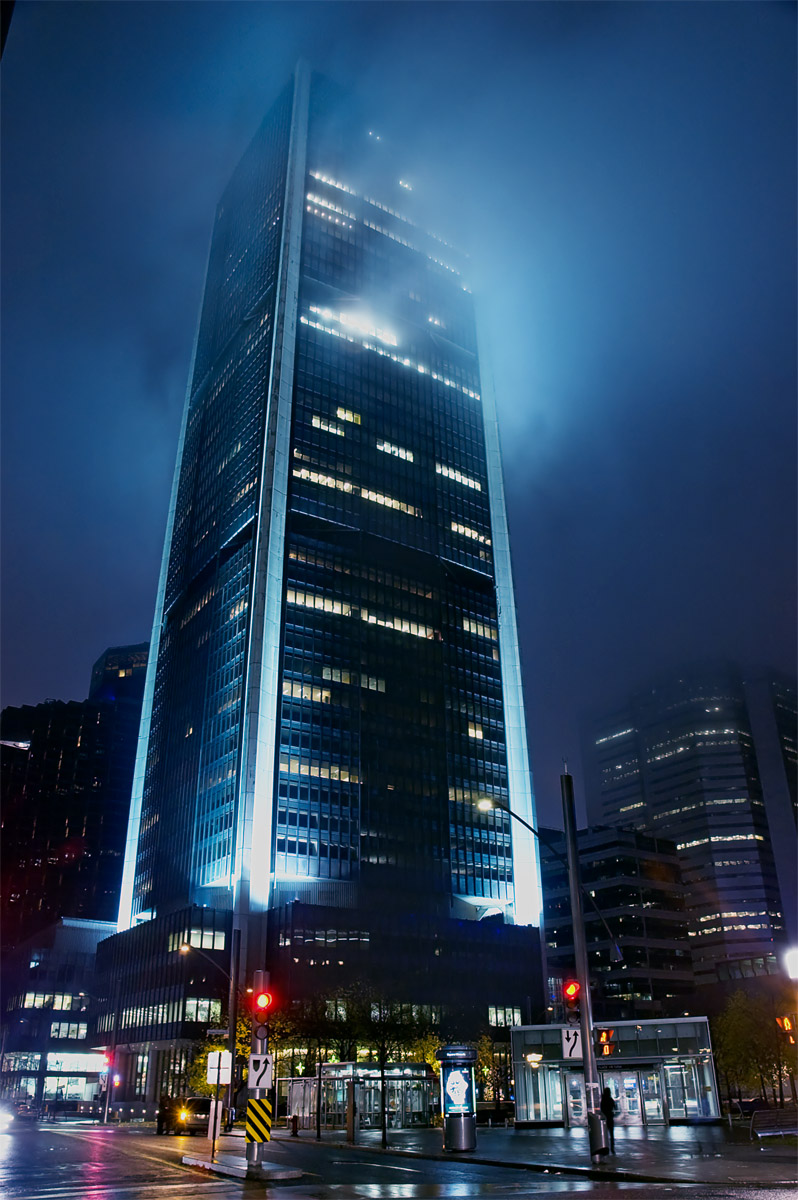
Tour de la Bourse (Stock Exchange Tower) near Square Victoria

=== Place de la Cité internationale and surroundings ===
Place de la Cité internationale, northwest of Victoria Square, is a complex that currently consists of the headquarters of the International Civil Aviation Organization (ICAO). The modern 17-storey building, completed in 1995, has its main entrance on the west side on University Street. A taller second phase has been announced on the site for quite some time, to fill the void near Tour de la Bourse.

Northwest of Victoria Square is the Complexe Maisonneuve, made of the two aluminum-clad Bell and National Bank of Canada towers built in 1982. Neighbouring Place Bonaventure, connected to the Bonaventure Metro station, marks the western boundary of the QIM. A tunnel built under University Street between Place de la Cité internationale and Place Bonaventure finally connected the eastern and western parts of the Underground City which had previously been separated.

== Design ==
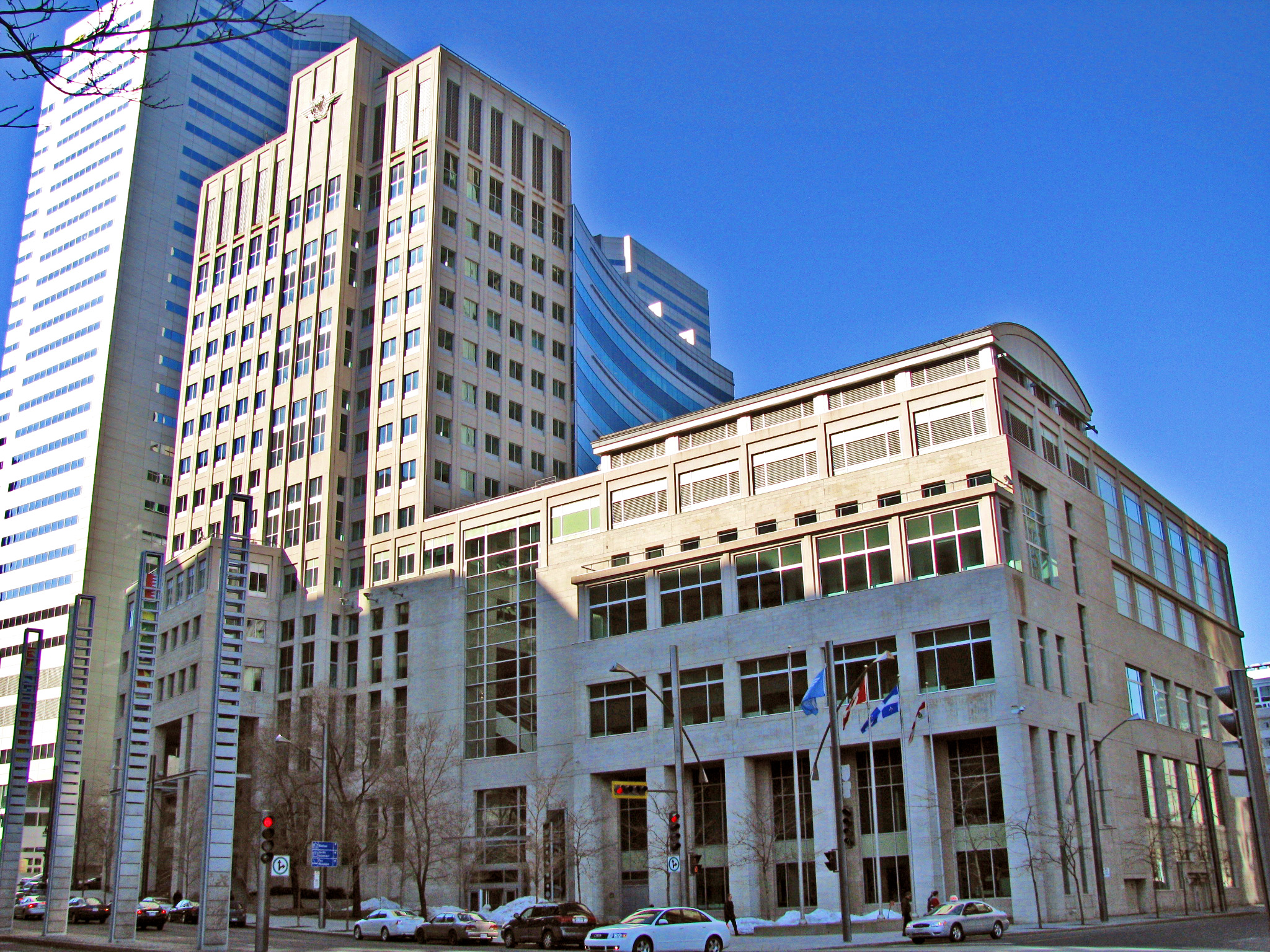
ICAO World Headquarters

Sidewalks were widened and re-paved in order to increase the pedestrian area by 40%. Open-air parking lots were eliminated and replaced with 1,300 new parking spaces added under the Palais des Congrès, Place Jean-Paul Riopelle, and the Centre CDP Capital. Several trees were planted, and distinctive street furniture and street lighting was installed, including 22 backlit columns adorned with world flags in the median divider on University Street, welcoming southern arrivals from the Bonaventure Expressway.

Clément Demers was responsible for overall project design, working with Consortium Daoust Lestage and Provencher, Roy et associés, with engineers Groupe conseil Genivar. Architect and urban planner Jean-Claude Marsan also consulted on the project.

As of September 2005, the project had received 22 awards in 13 different domains, including the PMI Project of the Year 2005 from the Project Management Institute of Philadelphia. The project's success played a part in the decision of the World Anti-Doping Agency and International Design Alliance to move to Montreal, joining the ICAO, IATA and several other international organizations. Chef Normand Laprise's world-famous Toqué! restaurant moved from its tiny Saint Denis Street location to the Centre CDP Capital on Place Jean-Paul Riopelle, putting the QIM on the international gastronomy map. The district has become a prestigious address for real estate development, with upscale housing built and under construction totalling approximately 1000 units as of 2005.

== Management ==
The project was managed by the Société du Quartier international de Montréal, a nonprofit organization created in July 1999 by the federal government of Canada, province of Quebec and city of Montreal, as well as the Caisse de dépôt et placement and the Association des riverains du Quartier international de Montréal (ARQIM). The initial budget for the project was CAD$76 million (approx. US$57 million); the actual cost was $90 million (US$68 million). According to QIM's management, more than half of the overrun resulted from additional work requested by the city, as well as additional expropriation costs. Total investment in the district from all sources was approximately $860 million (US$650 million) between 2000 and 2003.

== Future projects ==
Current projects include the beautification of McGill Street south of Victoria Square towards Old Montreal. There are long-term plans to continue the covering of the Ville-Marie Expressway further east to the currently dilapidated Viger Square behind City Hall, where the new land may be used for expansion of the mega-hospital Centre hospitalier de l'Université de Montréal built north of the expressway.

== See also ==
- Architecture of Quebec
