= Normand Laprise =

Quebecer chef (born 1961)

Normand Laprise CM CQ
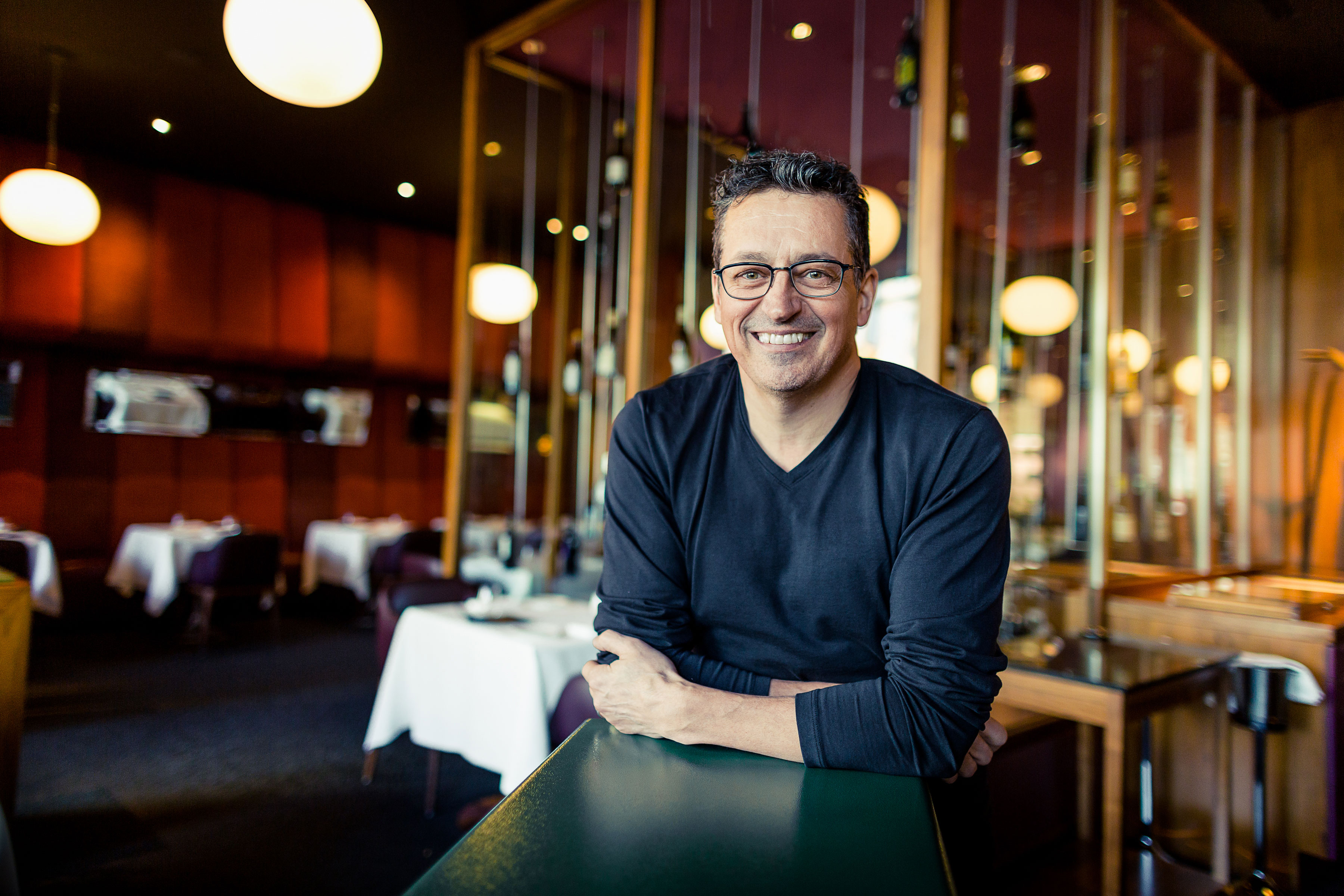
- Born: 24 mars 1961; Saint-Alexandre-de-Kamouraska, Quebec, Canada
- Education: École hôtelière de Charlesbourg; Stratford Chefs School

Normand Laprise CM CQ (born 1961) is a Quebecer chef and author. He is the owner and head chef of Toqué! and Brasserie T! in Montreal, Quebec, Canada.

== Early life and education ==
Normand Laprise was born in 1961 and raised on a farm in Kamouraska in the Bas-Saint-Laurent region of Quebec. At the age of 14 he began working in a restaurant as a dishwasher. After high school, not knowing what he wanted to do, he enrolled in culinary school at the École hôtelière de Charlesbourg in Quebec City, from which he graduated in 1981.

== Career ==
Laprise worked four years at the restaurant Le Lutétia at the Hôtel de la Montagne in Montreal, after which he had internships in France and the United States. Starting in 1989, he ran restaurant Citrus in Montreal, until its closure four years later. He then attended the Stratford Chefs School in Stratford, Ontario.

In June 1993, along with Christine Lamarche, Laprise co-founded restaurant Toqué! on Saint Denis Street in Montreal. Toqué was given a five diamond rating by the American Automobile Association and the Canadian Automobile Association. In January 2004, Toqué relocated to the Centre CDP Capital in the Quartier international de Montréal. To In 2006, Laprise became a Relais & Châteaux Grand Chef.

In June 2010, he founded Brasserie T!, a French-inspired gastropub located in the Quartier des spectacles.

Along with Jean-Luc Boulay and Pasquale Vari, Normand Laprise is one of the three permanent judges on Quebec’s top cooking competition TV show Les chefs! broadcast on ICI Radio-Canada Télé since 14 June 2010, which is hosted by Élyse Marquis et Daniel Vézina.

== Awards ==
In 2009, Laprise was named a Knight of the National Order of Quebec for his promotion of Quebec cuisine. In 2014, he was named a Member of the Order of Canada for the same reason.

On May 3, 2013, Laprise won a James Beard Foundation Award for his book, Toqué! in the Cooking from a Professional Point of View category.
