= Île aux Oies =

Island in the St. Lawrence River in Canada

- Location within Quebec

Geography
- Location: St. Lawrence River
- Coordinates: 47.13445°N 70.48333°W
- Archipelago: Archipelo of Ile-aux-Grues
- Length: 5 km (3.1 mi)
- Width: 1 km (0.6 mi)
- Highest elevation: 38 m (125 ft)

Administration
- Canada
- Province: Quebec
- Region: Chaudière-Appalaches
- MRC: Montmagny Regional County Municipality
- Canada

Demographics
- Languages: fr

The Île aux Oies (in English: goose island) is an island in the St. Lawrence River, downstream from Île d'Orléans. It is located in the municipality of Saint-Antoine-de-l'Isle-aux-Grues, in the Montmagny Regional County Municipality (MRC), in the administrative region of Chaudière-Appalaches, in Quebec, in Canada.

== Geography ==
L'Île aux Oies is located at the northeastern end of the Isle-aux-Grues archipelago. This island stretches 5 kilometres (3.1 mi) in length in the direction of the river (i.e. southwest to northeast); its maximum width is 1 kilometre (0.62 mi).

A flats stretching over 7 kilometres (4.3 mi) connects "Île aux Oies" to the southwest with Isle-aux-Grues. Strong river tides often flood this isthmus.

== Economic activities ==
Basically, the main economic activity on the islands (Île-aux-Grues and Île aux Oies) remains dairy farming and cheese making. The Île aux Oies is a private land; only cultivators and caretakers have access.

In addition, tourism has developed beyond the snow goose hunting season in other parts of archipelago. The Islands offer visitors a rural and wild character because of its position in the middle of the river. Many visitors come there for the tranquility of the place.

== Toponymy ==
At the start of the French colony in America, Île aux Grues and Île aux Oies were designated as a single island on maps of the time. On October 20, 1633, during his expedition to explore the territory of the Côte-du-Sud, the Jesuit Paul Le Jeune wrote in his letters (referred to as “Relations des Jésuites”): “we left this island [presumably the island aux Cranes] to enter another called Cachibasiouachgate. We could name it Isle aux Oies blancs, because I saw more than a thousand in a band”.

In 1646 by Charles Huault de Montmagny (1601-1657) acquired these two islands as well as the seigneury of Rivière-du-Sud. Renowned as a great hunting enthusiast, he served as the first governor in title (1636-1648) of New France. In 1654, the territory of these islands was acquired by Jean-Jacques Moyen, Sieur des Granges, who settled there. Reluctantly, he was assassinated the following year during an Iroquois passage. The island was subsequently acquired by Louis Couillard, Lord of Rivière-du-Sud. In 1668, Couillard ceded part of the island to Paul Dupuy, his son-in-law.

In 1671, the island was subdivided. Pierre Bécart de Granville, Lord of Île-aux-Grues, became the owner of the western part, known at the time as Petite île aux Oies. While Paul Dupuy remains the owner of the eastern part, which was designated "Grande Île aux Oies". In 1713, the latter ceded his property to the Augustinian nuns of the Hôtel-Dieu de Québec. Subsequently, the nuns designated it their island lordship "Île Marie", as did the small boat transporting the foodstuffs they produced to Quebec. In 1875, the Augustines acquired Petite Île aux Oies (i.e. Île aux Grues today).

In 1964, Club Saint-Laurent acquired Île aux Oies, and around 1975, that of Domaine de l'Île aux Oies; these two territories were then exploited in private hunting clubs.

Île aux Oies derives its toponymic designation from the presence of the Snow Goose during migratory periods. These birds attract many hunters during their stopover in autumn, that is, during their seasonal migration to the south. In history, several other toponymic variants (written and oral) have been listed, including Île Sainte-Marie, La Bécard, Île Hôpital, Île des Prairies, Île des Joncs and Île des Brousses. The toponym "Île aux Oies" was made official on December 5, 1968, at the Commission de toponymie du Québec place name bank.

== See also ==
- List of islands of Quebec
