= Saint-Antoine-de-l'Isle-aux-Grues =

- Parish municipality
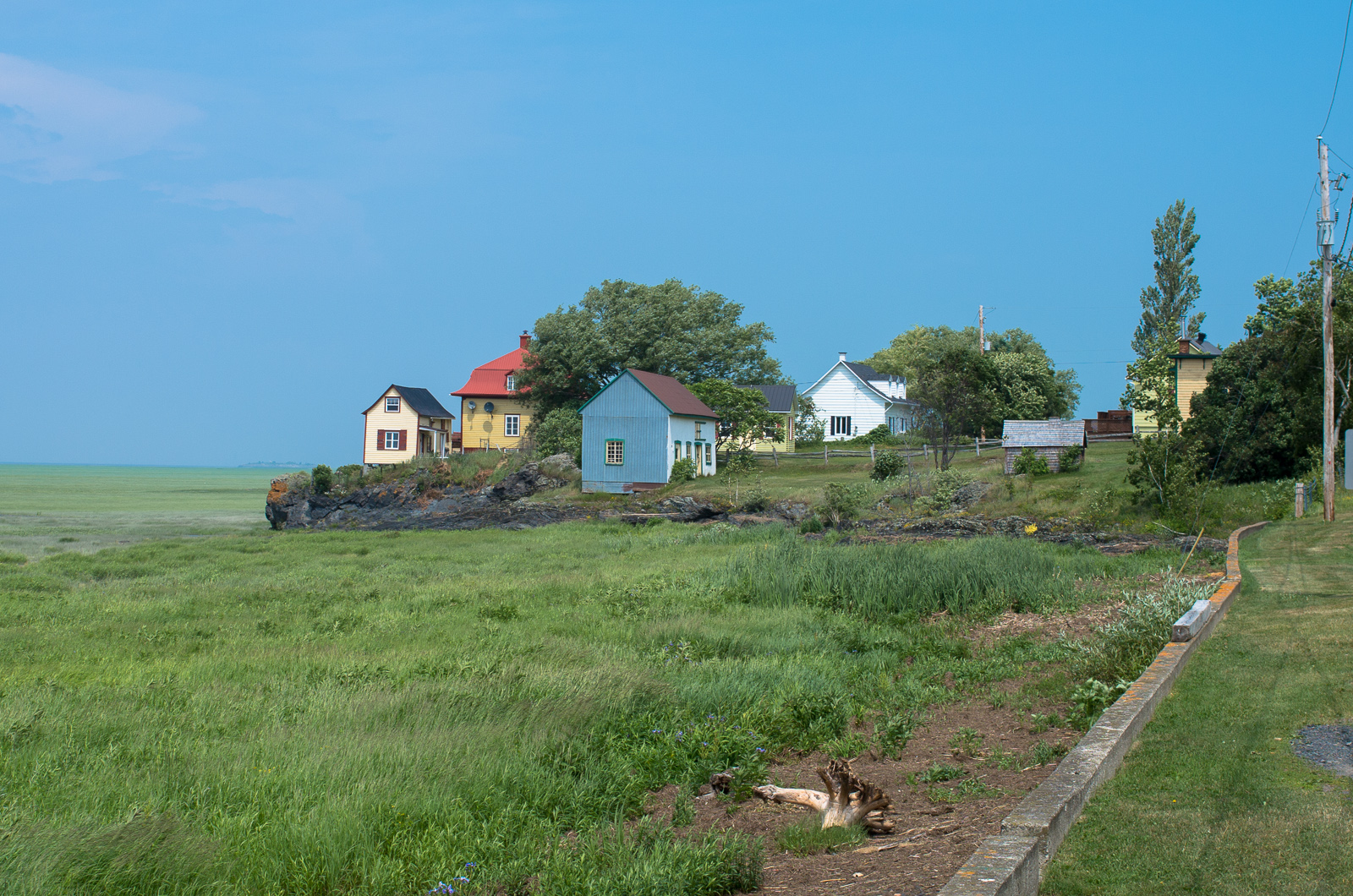

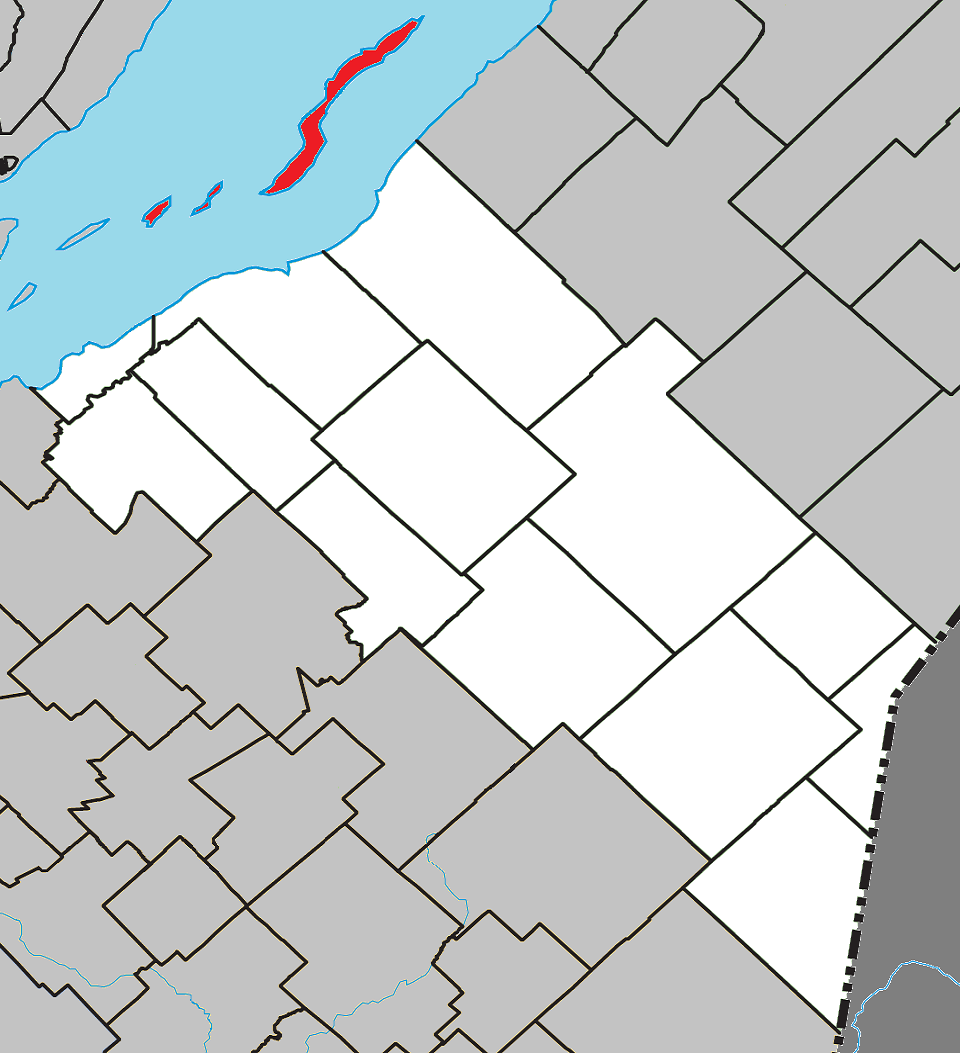
- Location within Montmagny RCM

- Location in province of Quebec
- Coordinates: 47°04′N 70°33′W
- Country: Canada
- Province: Quebec
- Region: Chaudière-Appalaches
- RCM: Montmagny
- Constituted: January 1, 1860

Government
  - Mayor: Frédéric Poulin
  - Federal riding: Côte-du-Sud—Rivière-du-Loup—Kataskomiq—Témiscouata
  - Prov. riding: Côte-du-Sud

Area
  - Total: 24.16 km^{2} (9.33 sq mi)
  - Land: 23.97 km^{2} (9.25 sq mi)

Population (2021)
  - Total: 122
  - Density: 5.1/km^{2} (13/sq mi)
  - Pop (2016-21): ▼15.3%
  - Dwellings: 102
- Time zone: UTC−5 (EST)
  - Summer (DST): UTC−4 (EDT)
- Postal code(s): G0R 1P0
- Area codes: 418 and 581
- Highways: No major routes
- Website: www.isle-aux-grues.com

Saint-Antoine-de-l'Isle-aux-Grues (French pronunciation: [sɛ̃t‿ɑ̃twan də lil o ɡʁy]) is a parish municipality in Quebec, Canada, in the Montmagny Regional County Municipality in the administrative region of Chaudière-Appalaches. It is known for birdwatching, goose-hunting, and cheeses.

== History ==
In 1831, the local parish was formed, called Saint-Antoine in honour of Anthony of Padua. In 1845, the Parish Municipality of Saint-Antoine-de-l'Isle-aux-Grues was created, taking its name from the parish and the archipelago.

=== 2010 plane crash ===
On May 19, 2010, at about 3:30 p.m. Eastern time, a Cessna 172 airplane carrying four people crashed on Isle-aux-Grues, killing three people.

== Geography ==
Saint-Antoine-de-l'Isle-aux-Grues includes of the majority of islands in the Isle-aux-Grues Archipelago. Its major islands are:

- Île aux Grues, largest island and the only one permanently inhabited
- Île aux Oies, formerly also known by its English name Île Goose
- Grosse Île, long a quarantine site for immigrants and now a national historic site
- Île Sainte-Marguerite
- Île au Canot
- Île Longue
- Île à Deux Têtes
- Île du Cheval
- Île la Sottise

== Demographics ==
In the 2021 Census of Population conducted by Statistics Canada, Saint-Antoine-de-l'Isle-aux-Grues had a population of 122 living in 72 of its 102 total private dwellings, a change of −15.3% from its 2016 population of 144. With a land area of 23.97 km^{2} (9.25 sq mi), it had a population density of 5.1/km^{2} (13.2/sq mi) in 2021.

Historical census populations – Saint-Antoine-de-l'Isle-aux-Grues

Year	Pop.	±%
1871	639	—
1881	630	−1.4%
1891	586	−7.0%
1901	517	−11.8%
1911	681	+31.7%
1921	646	−5.1%
1931	510	−21.1%
1941	528	+3.5%

Year	Pop.	±%
1951	461	−12.7%
1956	425	−7.8%
1961	364	−14.4%
1966	260	−28.6%
1971	234	−10.0%
1976	215	−8.1%
1981	236	+9.8%
1986	238	+0.8%

Year	Pop.	±%
1991	202	−15.1%
1996	176	−12.9%
2001	158	−10.2%
2006	163	+3.2%
2011	146	−10.4%
2016	144	−1.4%
2021	122	−15.3%

Source: Statistics Canada

== Government ==
List of former mayors:

- George Painchaud (1867–1869, 1887–1889, 1892–1893)
- Gatien Lachaîne (1869–1875)
- Louis Lavoie (1875–1887)
- Wilfrid Lavoie (1889–1892)
- Fénélon Vézina (1893–1903)
- Paul Charles Painchaud (1903–1911, 1920–1929)
- Joseph Lavoie (1911–1920)
- Joseph N. Lemieux (1929–1935)
- Olivier Gagné (1935–1939)
- Alfred Roy (1939–1945)
- François-Marcellin Bernier (1945–1947, 1954–1960)
- Joseph Jean Baptiste Painchaud (1947–1954)
- Paul-Eugène Lavoie (1960–1977)
- Gaston Bernier (1977–1978)
- Gabriel Vézina (1978–1979)
- Michel Normand (1979–1990)
- Louise Dion Roy (1990–2003)
- Jacques-André Roy (2003–2009)
- Frédéric Poulin (2009–2015, 2023–present)
- Lisette Vézina Painchaud (2015–2017)
- Pierre Gariepy (2017–2023)

== Transportation ==
L'Isle-aux-Grues has a small airstrip, which provides the only access to the island during the winter, with Air Montmagny the main airline. A ferry operates during the summer months.

== Education ==
Children from Isle-aux-Grues attend school in Montmagny, Quebec, travelling by plane each day.

== See also ==
- List of parish municipalities in Quebec
