= La Joute =

1969 sculpture by Jean-Paul Riopelle

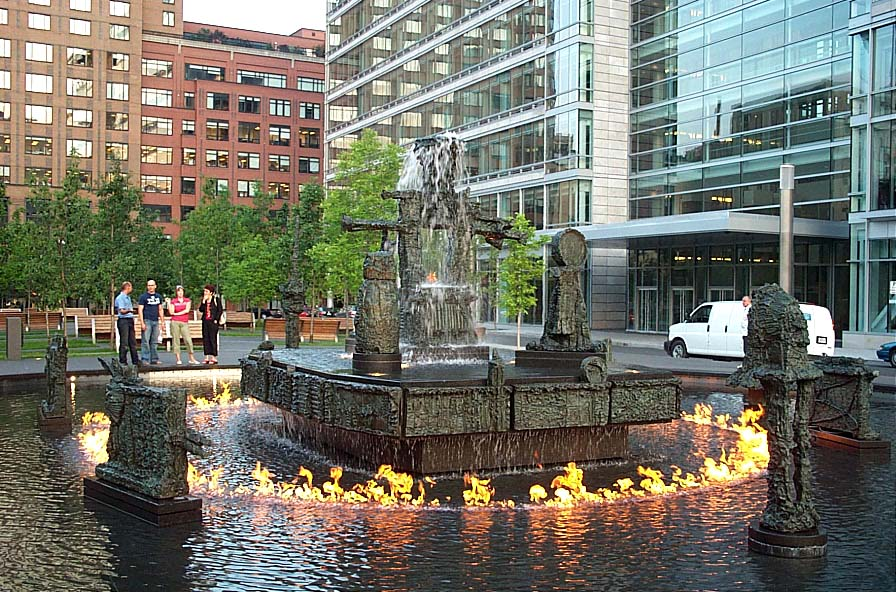
- La Joute, by Jean-Paul Riopelle, during the flaming phase of its kinetic cycle
- Location: 45°30′12.68″N 73°33′41.82″W

La Joute ("The Joust") is a 1969 public sculptural installation by Quebec artist Jean-Paul Riopelle, a member of the Automatiste movement. It is currently located in Place Jean-Paul-Riopelle in the Quartier international in Montreal.

== Design ==
The ensemble of bronze sculptures contains a central fountain surrounded by a number of freestanding abstract animal and human figures inside and outside the fountain basin.

The fountain operates on a kinetic sequence that takes about 32 minutes to complete. It begins a few minutes before the half-hour, every hour from 7 to 11 p.m. during the summer. The sequence starts when the fountain jet expands to form a dome over the sculptures. Then at the back end of the park the grates on the ground start to mist. The 12 grates each mist, one after the other in sequence, taking about 90 seconds to sequence from one to another until they reach the fountain. After about 18 minutes, machines inside the fountain start to produce a particularly dense cloud. The fountain jet then turns into a dribble. On the hour, nozzles in a ring surrounding the central sculpture within the basin shoot up jets of natural gas through the water; these are lit by flame sources installed in the bases of some of the sculptures, producing a dramatic ring of flame. The flame lasts for about seven minutes. The fountain itself stops. The misting stops, and then the fire is "doused" by the fountain which has restarted. The mist sequence, without the fire in the fountain, occurs every hour throughout the day.

== Relocation ==
The statue was formerly located in the Parc Olympique, in the Hochelaga-Maisonneuve district of Montreal. Its relocation to the Place Jean-Paul-Riopelle during the redevelopment of the Quartier international de Montréal in 2003 provoked controversy and outrage from residents of Hochelaga-Maisonneuve, who claimed that moving it from the Parc Olympique deprived it of the context required for its full meaning as an homage to sport.

Those who supported the move, including the Quebec government, Riopelle's heirs, and the artwork's owner, the Musée d'art contemporain de Montréal, argued that moving it would allow a proper homage to Riopelle, and that it would allow the work to be more widely seen and exhibited as the artist intended, whereas its previous location had been inaccessible and had not included the fountain or fire elements Riopelle designed.

In September 2013 a program of renovation was announced, but with no schedule.
