= Palais des congrès de Montréal =

Convention centre in Montreal

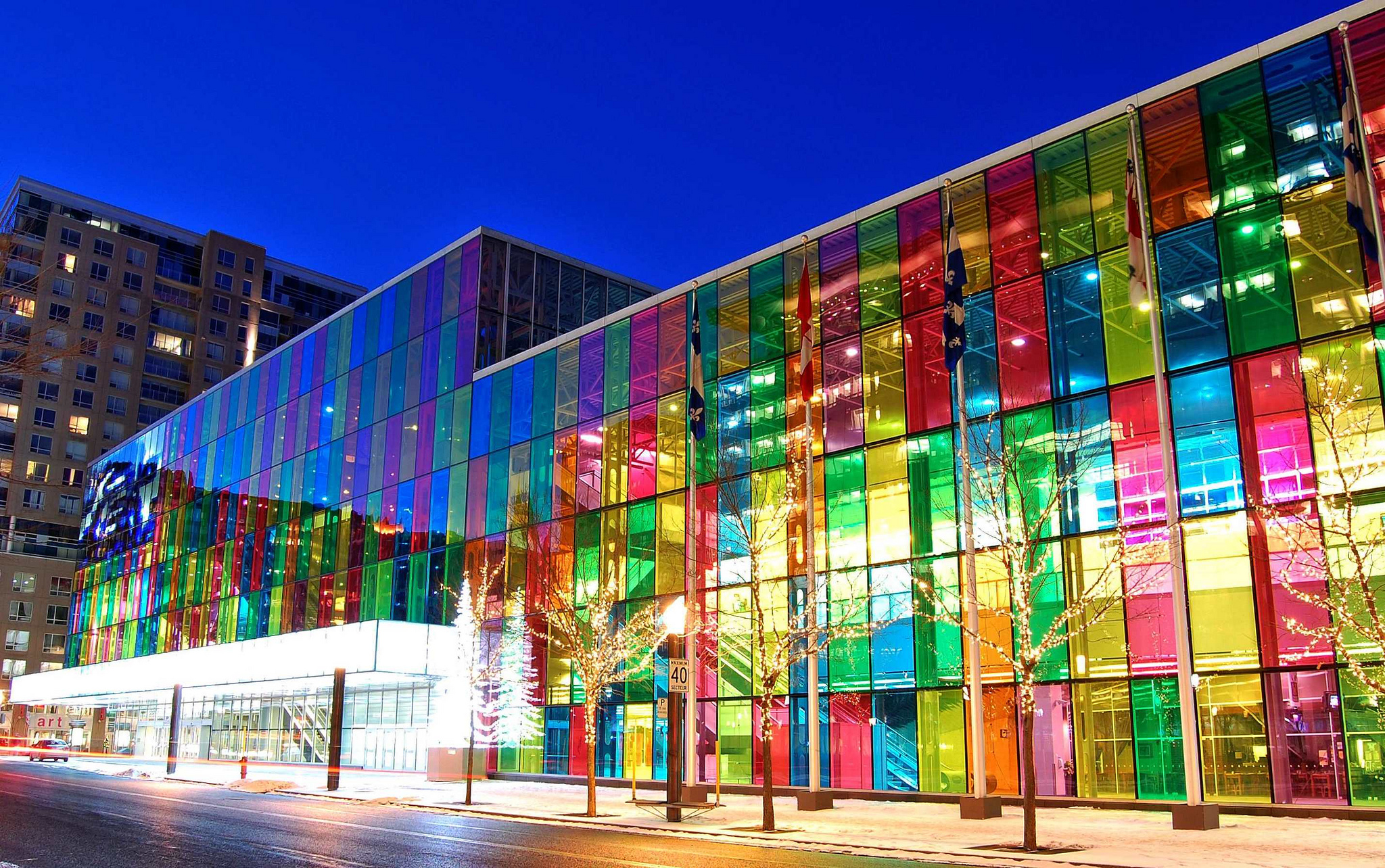
- As seen from Place Jean-Paul-Riopelle
- Interactive map of Palais des congrès de Montréal
- Address: 1001, Pl. Jean-Paul-Riopelle; Montreal, Quebec; H2Z 2B3
- Coordinates: 45°30′16″N 73°33′36″W
- Public transit: Place-d'Armes station

Website
- Official website

The Palais des congrès de Montréal is a convention centre in Montreal's Quartier international at the north end of Old Montreal. Its borough is Ville-Marie. Construction began in 1977 and completed in 1983; the Palais opened on 21 May 1983. Victor Prus designed the original building.

Place-d'Armes metro station is located in the building with an underground connection to and from the convention centre.

Some of the land for Palais des congrès was expropriated from Chinatown, Montreal, along with building of Complexe Guy-Favreau. Plans to expand the Palais began in 1997. It was expanded from 1999 to 2002, doubling its capacity from 92,000 square metres (990,000 sq ft) to 184,000 square metres (1,980,000 sq ft). The expansion was designed by a consortium of three firms: Tétrault Parent Languedoc; Saia Barbarese Topouzanov; and Aedifica, with Hal Ingberg.

This was the venue for the 2022 United Nations Biodiversity Conference, which led to the Kunming-Montreal Global Biodiversity Framework.

== Gallery ==
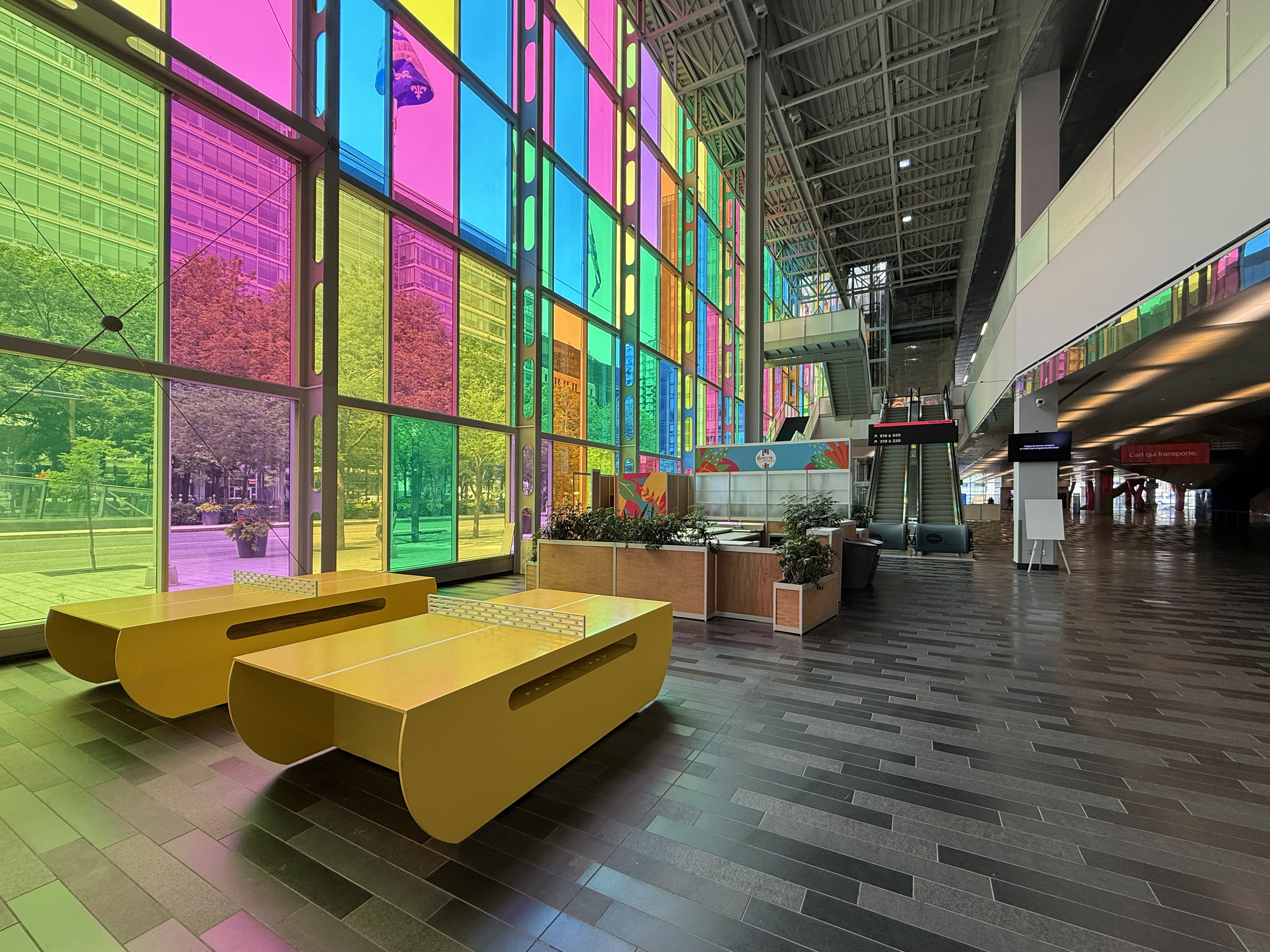
The Palais’ glass façade

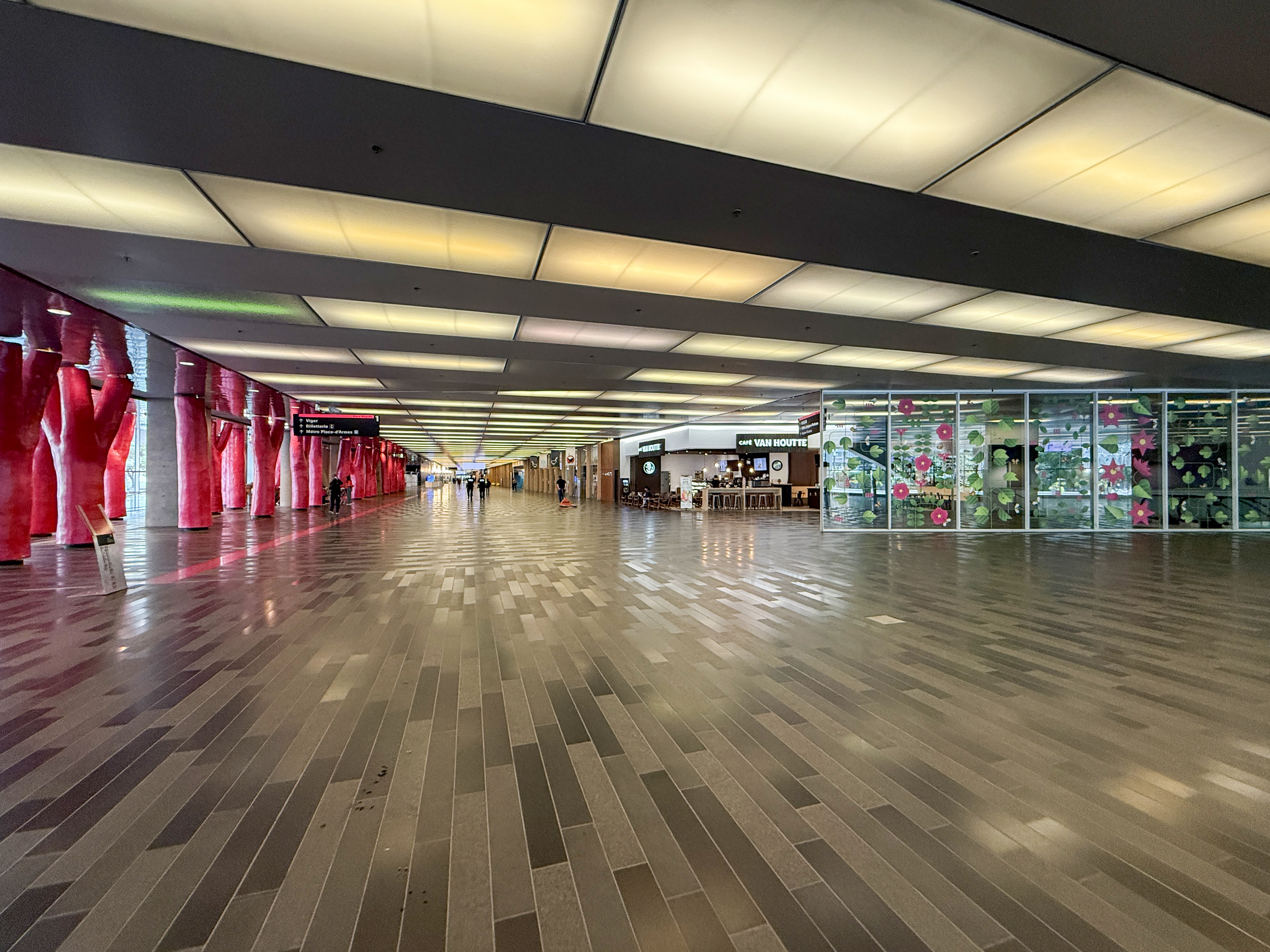
The Galleries of the Palace in ground level

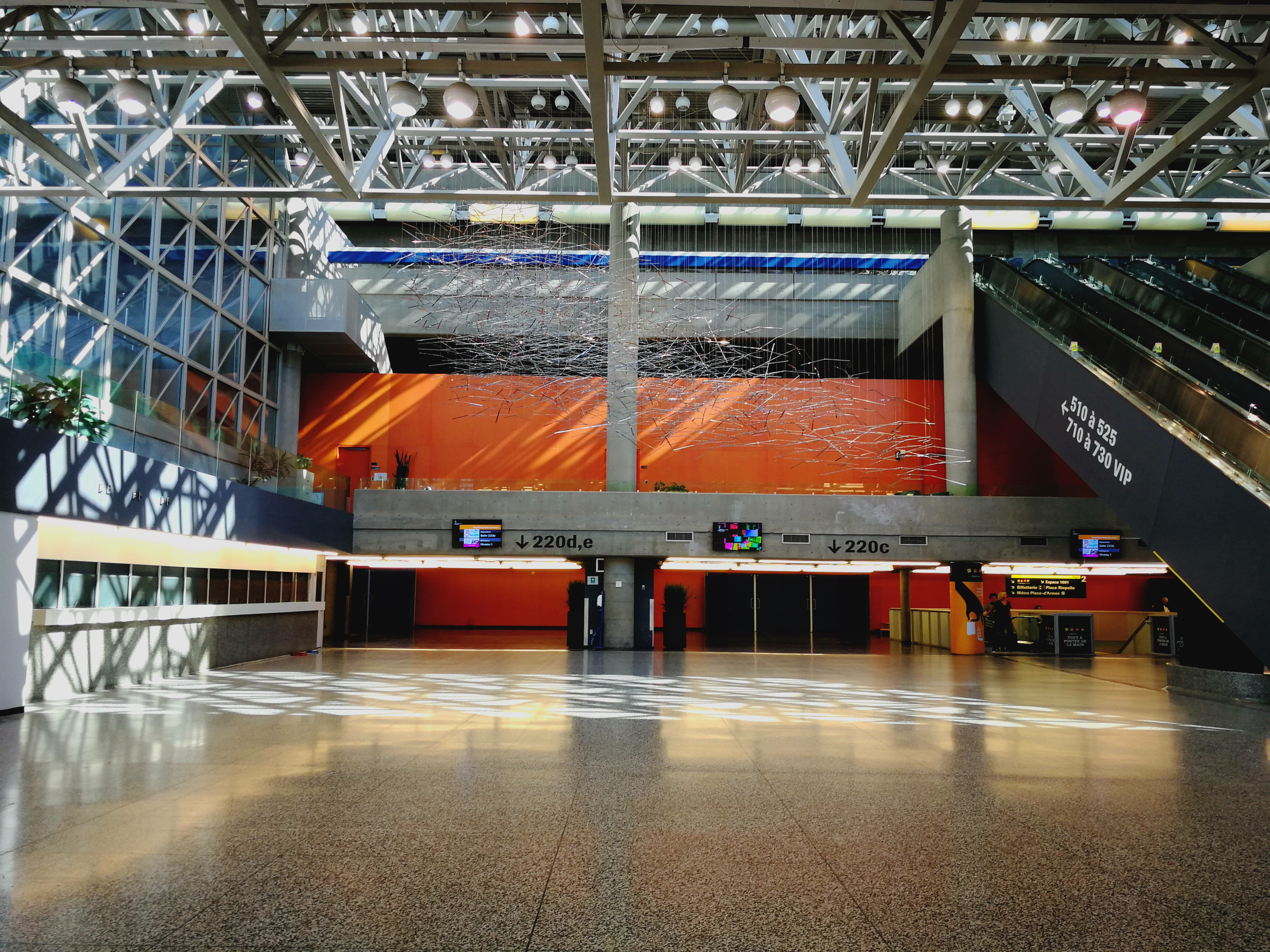
Viger Hall

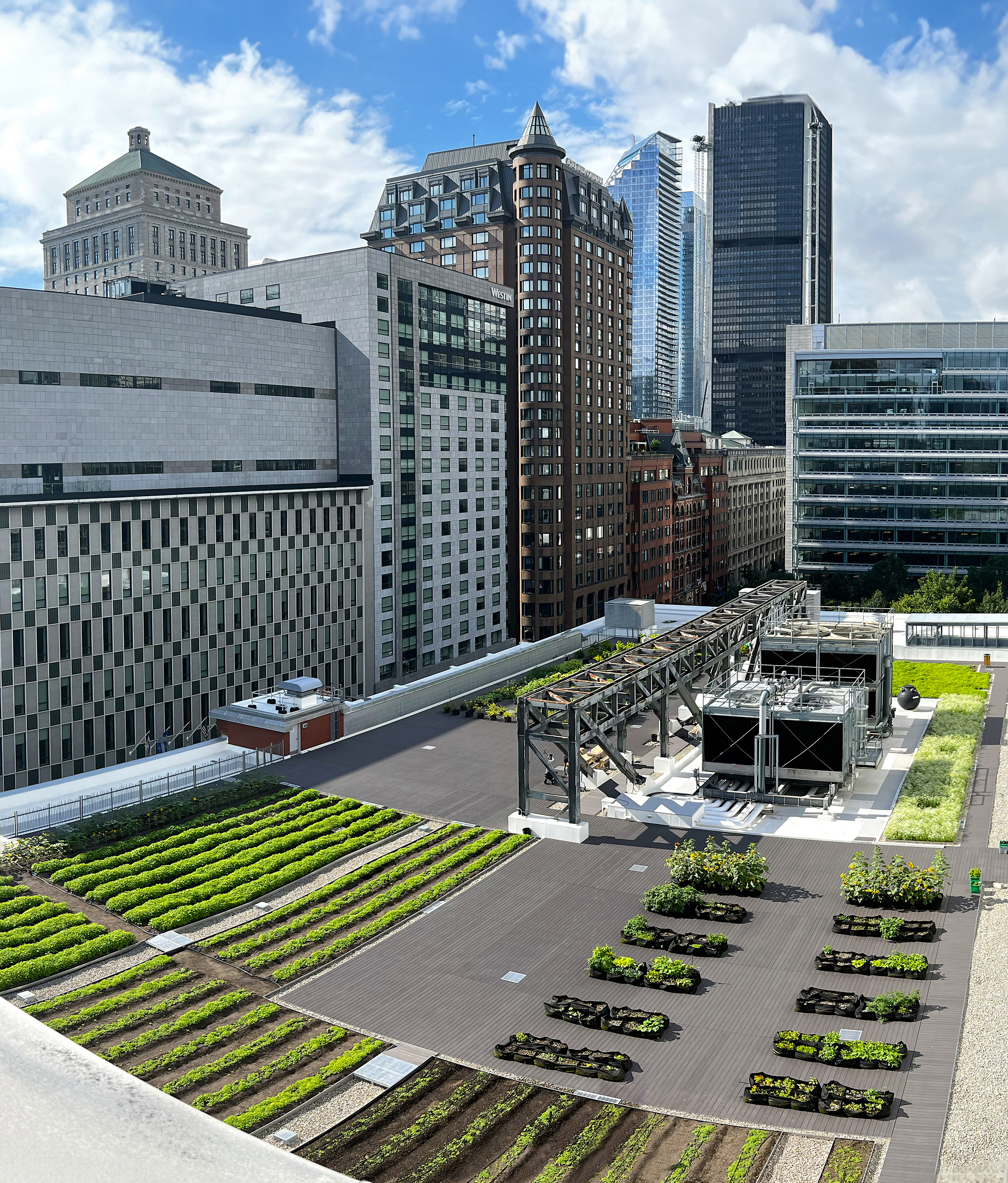
Urban Agriculture Lab in Level 5

== Sources ==
- Dunton, Nancy H.; Malkin, Helen (2008). A guidebook to contemporary architecture in Montreal. Douglas & McIntyre. OCLC 1200468415.
