= Place Jean-Paul Riopelle =

Square in Montreal, Canada

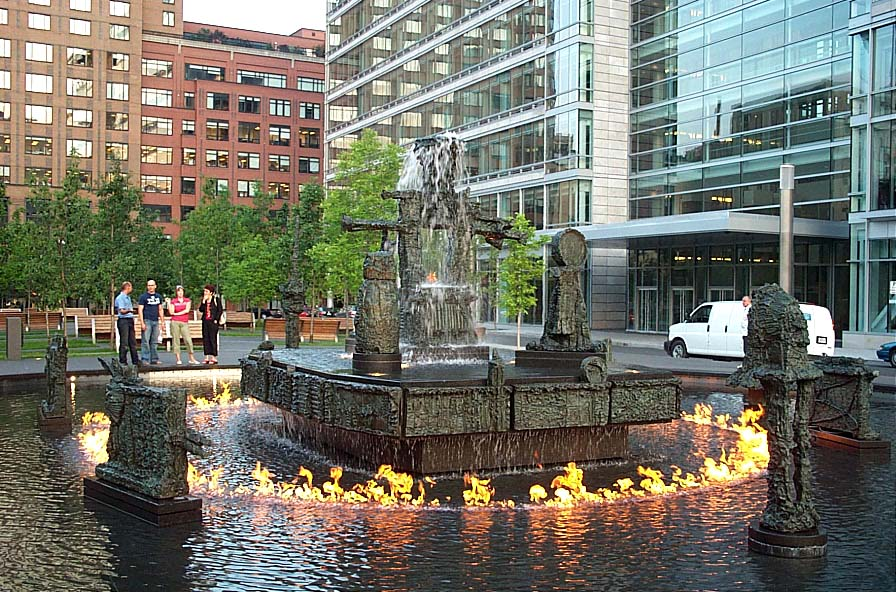
- La Joute on Place Jean-Paul Riopelle.

- Location within Montreal
- Location: Quartier international, Montreal, Quebec, Canada
- Coordinates: 45°30′11″N 73°33′40″W
- Created: 2004

Place Jean-Paul-Riopelle is a public square located in the Quartier international of Montreal, Quebec, Canada.

The square is bordered to the south by Saint Antoine Street West and the 27-storey château-style InterContinental Hotel, to the east is Bleury Street and the Palais des congrès de Montréal, to the west is the CDP Capital Centre and to the north is Viger Avenue West.

== History ==
The square was created in 2004 and was built over the Ville-Marie Expressway at the same time as the CDP Capital Centre. It was named in honour of Quebec artist Jean-Paul Riopelle who died in 2002. His fountain sculpture La Joute was moved to the square from the Olympic Park in Hochelaga-Maisonneuve.

== Features ==
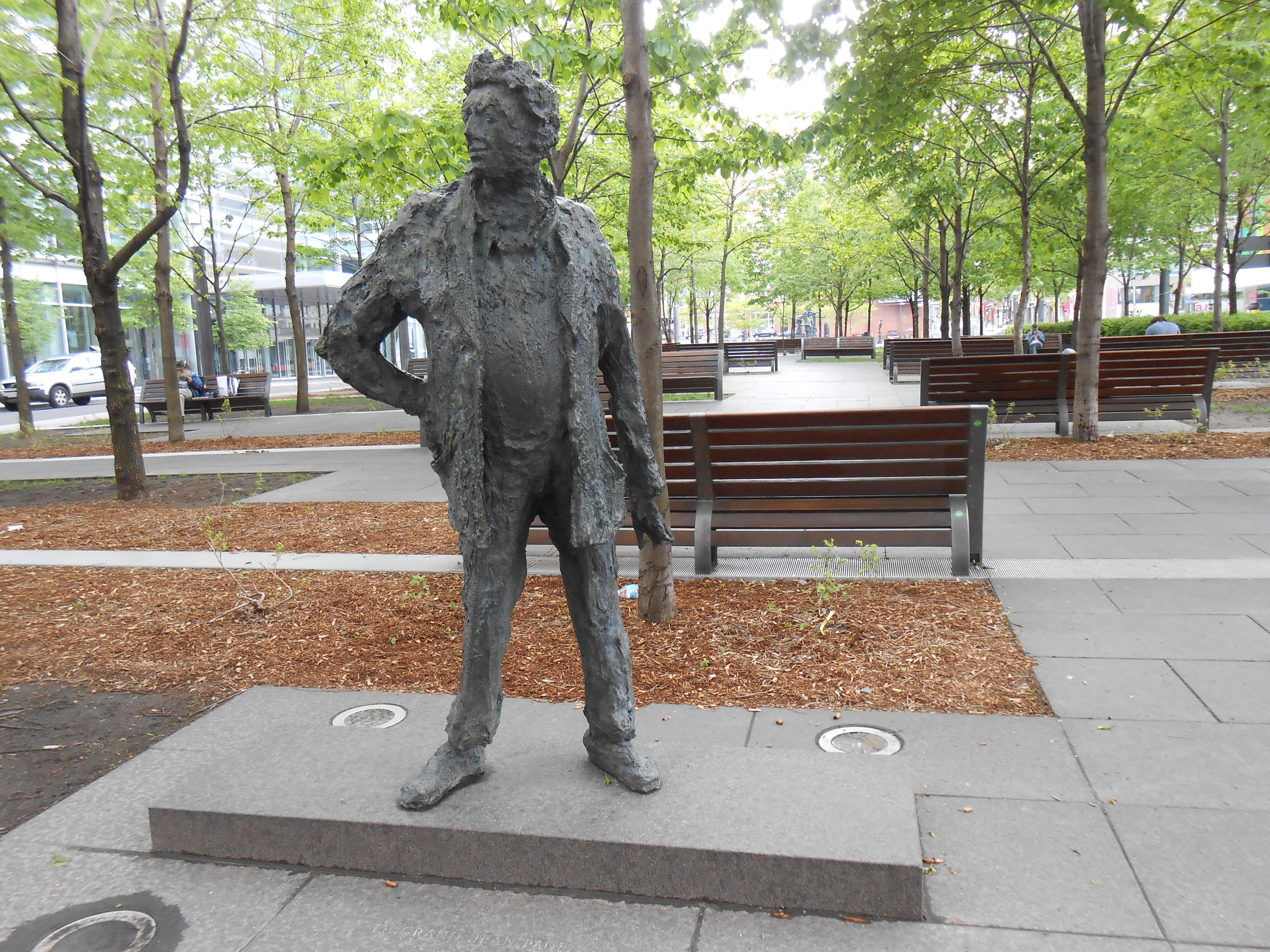
Le Grand Jean-Paul (2003) by Roseline Granet.

In the northern part of the square, a water basin highlights a sculpture by Jean-Paul Riopelle, titled La Joute (English: The Joust). La Joute's central element is a fountain with alternating water jets. A circle of fire appears on the surface of the water during summer evenings. This work was previously installed at the Olympic Park since 1976.

A sculpture representing Jean-Paul Riopelle (Le Grand Jean-Paul) stands in between the trees on the southern part of the square. It was realized by Roseline Granet in 2003.

Place Jean-Paul-Riopelle contains eighty-eight trees from eleven different species, including the Sugar Maple and Bitternut Hickory. These mature trees are planted in a random pattern reminiscent of a computer printed circuits. From the ground, gutters project light mist during late night entertainment of "La Joute".

=== La Joute ===
The relocation of La Joute to Place Jean-Paul Riopelle provoked controversy and outrage from residents of Hochelaga-Maisonneuve, who claimed that moving it from the Olympic Park to the Quartier international deprived it of the context required for its full meaning as an homage to sport. Those who supported the move, including the Government of Quebec and Riopelle's heirs, argued it would allow the work to be more widely seen and exhibited as the artist intended, including the fountain and fire elements Riopelle designed.
