= Isle-aux-Grues =

Island in the St. Lawrence River in Quebec, Canada

Native name: Old name=Île Crane
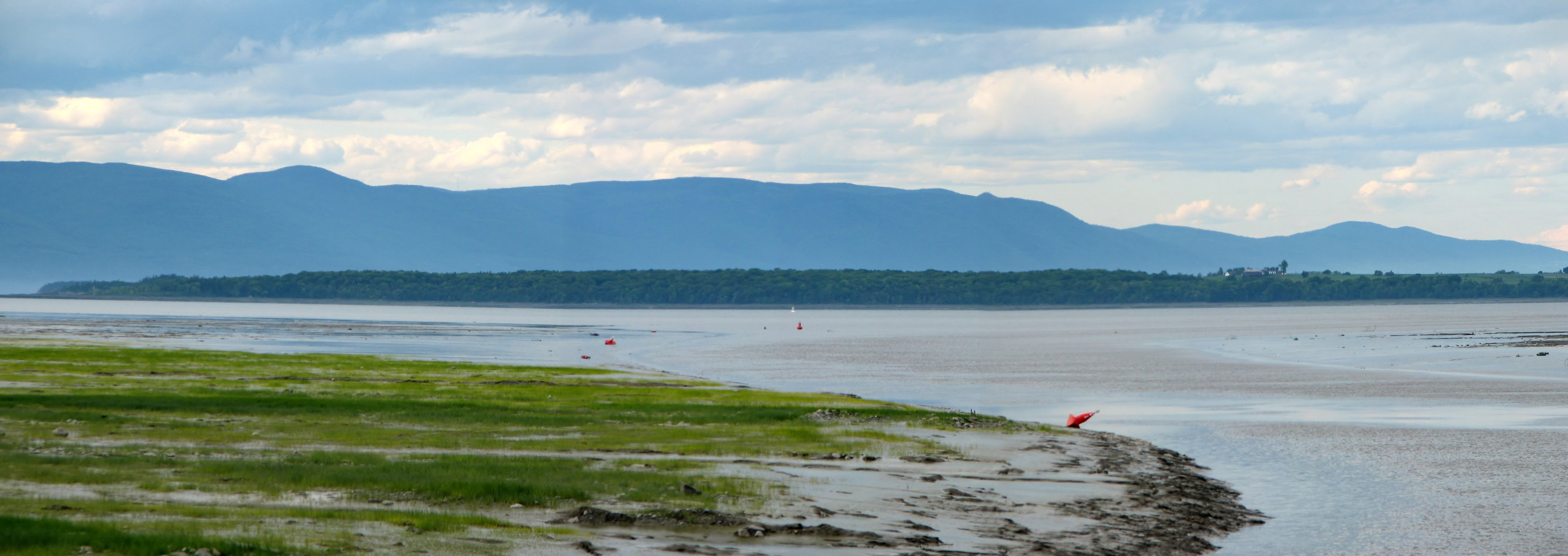
- Isle-aux-Grues

- Location within Quebec

Geography
- Location: Saint Lawrence River
- Coordinates: 47°03′34″N 70°32′35″W
- Archipelago: Isle-aux-Grues
- Length: 7 km (4.3 mi)
- Width: 2 km (1.2 mi)

Administration
- Canada
- Parish municipality: Saint-Antoine-de-l'Isle-aux-Grues

Isle-aux-Grues (French for "island of cranes") is an island situated on the Saint Lawrence River, in the municipality of Saint-Antoine-de-l'Isle-aux-Grues, in the Montmagny Regional County Municipality (MRC), in administrative region of Chaudière-Appalaches, in Quebec, in Canada.

== Geography ==
The Isle-aux-Grues is measuring about 7 kilometres long and 2 kilometres wide. However, its dimensions increase to 10 kilometres (6.2 mi) by 4 kilometres (2.5 mi), if including the flats which connect it to Île aux Oies. It is one of the twenty-one islands which make up the Isle-aux-Grues archipelago.

== Transportation ==
The island has an airstrip which is the only access to the island during the winter. Isle-aux-Grues is also served by a ferry during the summer.

== Education ==
Children from Isle-aux-Grues attend school in Montmagny, Quebec, travelling by plane each day.

== Person connected to the island ==
- The Québecois painter Jean-Paul Riopelle died on the island on 12 March 2002.

== May 2010 plane crash ==
On May 19, 2010 at about 3:30 p.m. Eastern time, a Cessna 172 airplane carrying four people crashed on Isle-aux-Grues, killing three people initially. The fourth later died in hospital.

== Toponymy ==
The toponym "Île aux Grues" was made official on December 5, 1968 at the Commission de toponymie du Québec.
