= Rita Letendre =

Canadian artist (1928–2021)

Rita Letendre OC OQ OOnt
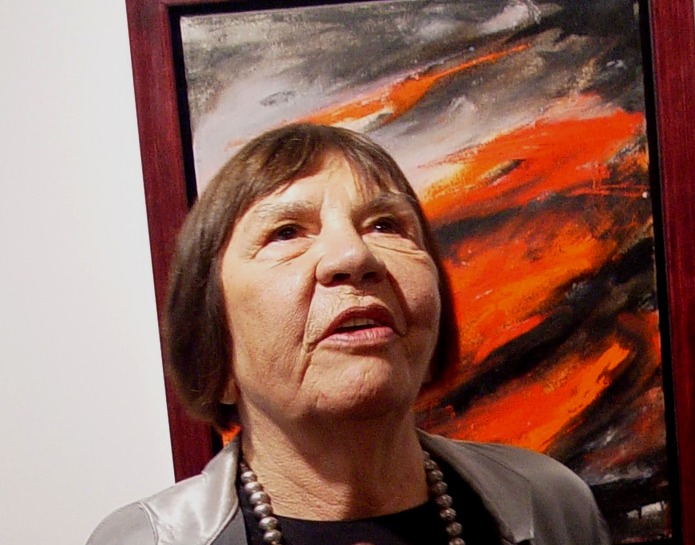
- Letendre in 2008
- Born: November 1, 1928; Drummondville, Quebec, Canada
- Died: November 20, 2021 (aged 93); Toronto, Ontario, Canada
- Education: École des beaux-arts de Montréal
- Movement: Les Automatistes
- Awards: Order of Canada (2005); Governor General's Award (2010); Queen Elizabeth II Diamond Jubilee Medal (2012)

Rita Letendre, OC OQ OOnt RCA LL. D. (November 1, 1928 – November 20, 2021) was a Canadian painter, muralist, and printmaker associated with Les Automatistes and the Plasticiens. She was an Officer of the Order of Canada and a recipient of the Governor General's Award.

== Early life ==
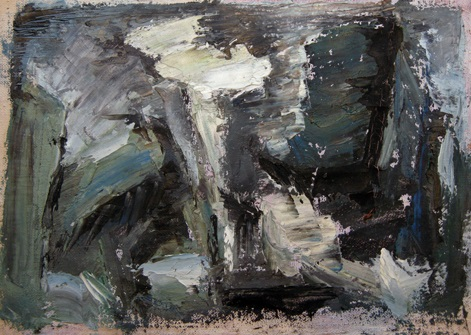
RL-51 - Very early small-format abstract painting, 1951

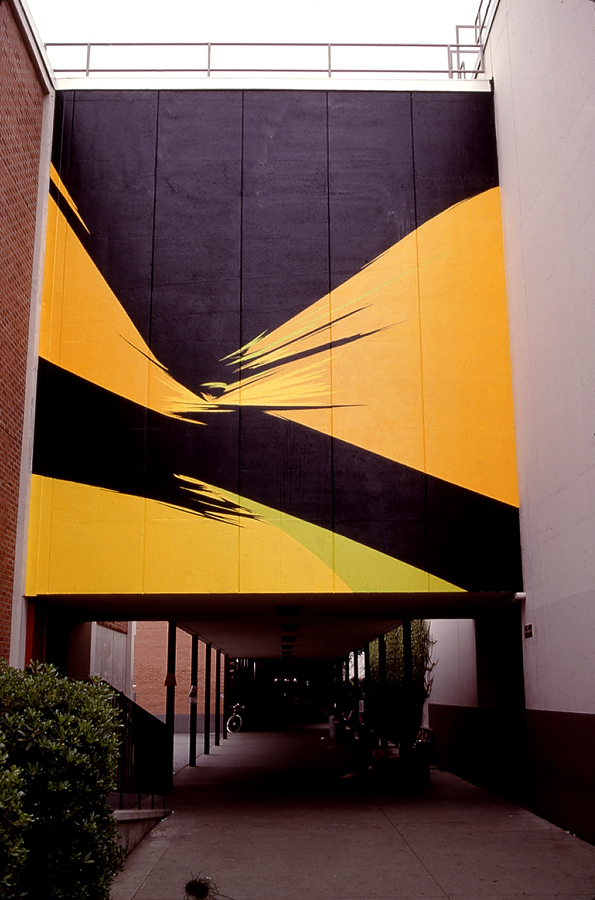
Sunforce – Hard edge style mural, 1965

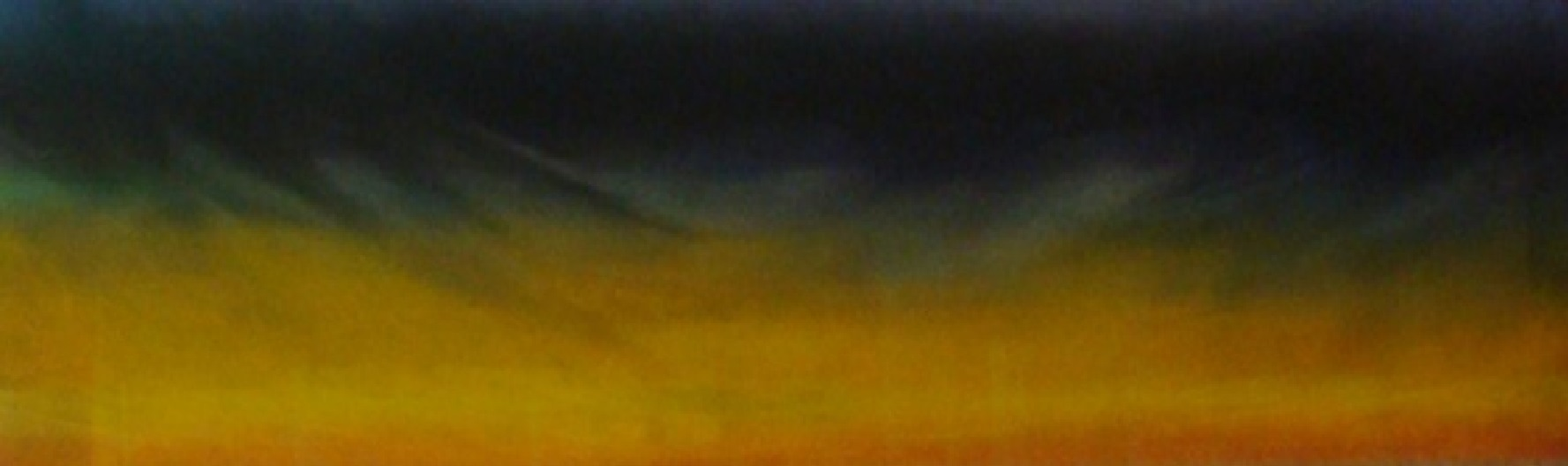
Sunrise – Pastel on paper, 1989

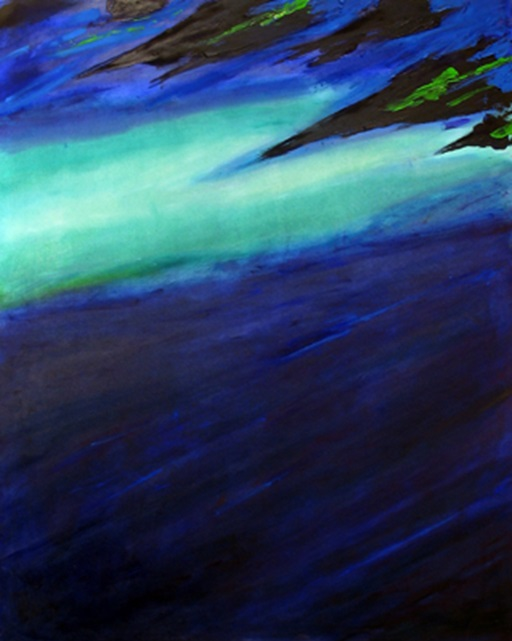
The Beginning of Days – Recent abstract style painting, 2007

Letendre was born the eldest of seven children to Anne-Marie Ledoux and Héliodore Letendre in Drummondville, Quebec. She was of Abenaki and Québécois descent. At age 19, while working at a restaurant in mid-town Montreal, a patron saw sketches she was working on when business became quiet and was struck by her talent. Practically insisting that she enroll in the École des beaux-arts de Montréal (of which Letendre had never heard), he picked her up at home, took her to the school and stood at the bottom of the steps ensuring she entered, then continued to stand there long enough for her to be asked if she was enrolling – the answer was "Yes". After several questionnaires and a practical exam, she was accepted.

It was there that she met friends Gilles Groulx and Ulysse Comtois, who was to be her partner for over 15 years. There she worked in an academic atmosphere for a year and a half. In 1950, she went to view an art show "L'Exposition des Rebelles" (despite being largely condemned by her professors) and befriended the show organizer Jean-Paul Mousseau – this was her introduction to the circle of Paul-Émile Borduas and Les Automatistes. Soon thereafter, she left the École des beaux-arts de Montréal.

== The Automatistes ==
Paul-Émile Borduas (the main force behind the manifesto Refus Global) was probably the greatest influence to Letendre's life as a painter – he believed self-knowledge was the key to producing highly personal work. When she was mocked for painting figurative images, Borduas would defend her, insisting figurative painting or non-figurative painting was still painting. By 1951, Letendre had abandoned figuration and become an abstract painter. She began showing with the Automatistes in store windows and on fences in St-Louis Square in Montreal.

== The Plasticiens ==
Her first official group show was in 1955 at the Henri Tranquille bookstore in Montreal, alongside other first and second generation Automatistes. Eventually her work was noticed, most notably by artist/art critic Rodolphe de Repentigny (Jauran) (the major force behind the Plasticiens, who espoused the philosophies of Piet Mondrian and the virtues of geometric form in art).

Impressed by the structure and form in the works of the Plasticiens, Letendre began changing her style to a more geometric one, employing more structured colour fields, zones of energy, thus temporarily abandoning the purely instinctual approach of automatism. She showed at Espace 55 with the Plasticiens – the exhibition was shown in Quebec, Montréal, Rimouski and Toronto – the same year as she had her first solo show at L'Echourie in Montreal.

== Zen and Abstract Expressionism ==
In the late 1950s, having internalized the ideas of the Plasticiens, she abandoned the confines of geometric works and began studying the ideas of Zen and Confucius; these ideas began to translate into her paintings characterized by lines and strokes in black and white. She was also struck by the work of the Abstract Expressionists in New York and in particular, impressed by the work of Franz Kline. Many of these elements and themes would be revisited in the works that soon followed, increasing in gestural quality and characterized with heavy impasto with a palette knife or spatula. Her production began to increase and Letendre began to come into her own, winning first prize in the Concours de la Jeune Peinture in 1959 and the Prix Rodolphe-de-Repentigny in 1960. This prize (worth $300) and the additional sales that followed enabled Letendre to quit her job and paint full-time – it also allowed her to buy more paint and canvas.

Armed with better paint, more colors and more material, she began painting larger works in explosions of violent colour and won second prize in the painting category in the Concours artistiques du Québec in 1961. Her compositions were intensely personal, more carefully planned; she began anchoring masses with carefully visualized gestures which would often take hours to visualize and execute. Having secured a Canada Council grant in 1962, she travelled with Ulysse Comtois throughout Europe for the next year and a half. This was a productive period and she sent large groups of works home; the beginnings of her hard edge style also began, where more well defined masses or wedges would evoke vibration, movement and collisions. In Italy she showed at Spoleto, won a gold medal at Piccola Europa in Sassaferator, and met Russian-born sculptor Kosso Eloul. On Eloul's invitation to work in one of his studios, she travelled with Ulysse Comtois to paint in Israel.

== Hard Edge ==
In the middle and late 1960s, she simplified her work and focused on hard-edge geometric shapes and movement, developing what became known as her flèches (arrows) so that diagonal lines activated the surface of her works. Her personal life changed too. She travelled to Paris for three months and ended her relationship with Ulysse Comtois; by the end of the year she was in a new relationship with Kosso Eloul. When he took a teaching position at California State College at Long Beach in March 1964, Letendre went with him. In California, two key opportunities availed her. The first was a commission to paint Sunforce a large mural executed on a campus building.

Sunforce represents a critical turning point in her technique. In the context of California with its Light and Space Group, her impasto work may have seemed to make little sense. Also, due to the massive scale of the mural, her current impasto technique was impractical and she was forced to adapt to the flat plane of the mural surface. In Sunforce, the image suggests a large mass that drops, and continues to drop as though it would continue through the bottom and off the painting. The second, was the opportunity to learn printmaking, lithography and eventually silk screen, a technique conducive to hard-edge shapes.

The couple left Los Angeles in 1969, alternating their time between New York and Toronto (which would continue until 1975) when Toronto became her centre, the demand for her work increased. In New York, galleries were purchasing entire series' of 100 prints outright. One day in 1971 someone suggested she might obtain a better effect on her long lines/rays if she used an airbrush; hesitant at first, she began using it more, then eventually used it all of the time. She found that airbrush brought her something new, something that neither oil, nor acrylic, nor the millions of lines she had made in the 1970s had succeeded in bringing her. The popularity of her work continued with many public and private commissions for large scale works and murals including one covering the top six stories of the Neill-Wycik college residence at Ryerson University in Toronto, the first of its kind in Canada. She was also commissioned to design a huge coloured skylight for the ceiling of Glencairn (TTC) subway station in Toronto entitled Joy; it was eventually removed at Letendre's request because the panels had faded after being exposed to many years of sunlight. However, "Joy" was reengineered and reinstalled in Glencarin Station in 2014 and cast a warm, orange glow over commuters to this day In the early 1970s, she began to soften some of the edges in her works, a trend that would continue the next few years; this resulted in a myriad of horizontal landscape compositions often containing a few or even only one thin hard edge line.

== Pastel ==
She began experimenting with pastels in 1980 and produced a series in 1982 inspired by the nearby Nevada landscape while staying with her husband in Beverly Hills as he recovered from heart surgery. Pastels and the techniques she developed with them afforded her an opportunity to create a soft edge effect in landscape like compositions using a completely different medium.

== Reversion to oil and current work ==
By 1995, she worked in heavier oils again, abandoning the airbrush completely, and controlled her gestural compositions with brush, palette knife and her hands. Her husband, Kosso Eloul, died later that year, and she took a long break from painting.

In the summer of 1997 she returned to painting and continued to show and develop her style. After having sold her house in Toronto, she moved back to Montreal in 2004. She went on to be awarded the Order of Canada in 2005, an honorary Ph.D. from the University of Montreal and the Governor General's Award in 2010 and the Queen Elizabeth II Diamond Jubilee Medal in 2012. At 87, Letendre has continued to produce and show works created as recently as 2014. In 2017 her work was included in the exhibition, The Ornament of a House: Fifty Years of Collecting at the Burnaby Art Gallery Her work also appeared in the first major museum retrospective of Letendre's work to originate outside Quebec held at the Art Gallery of Ontario in 2017, Rita Letendre: Fire & Light, which was said to be long overdue. It was co-curated by Wanda Nanibush and Georgiana Uhlyarik.

== Awards ==
- 1959 – Premier Prix, Concours de la Jeune Peinture
- 1960 - Prix Rodolphe-de-Repentigny
- 1961 - Prix de la Peinture, Province de Québec
- 1962 - Canada Council Travel Grant (Europe)
- 1962 - Gold Medal, Piccola Europa Exhibition, Sassoferrato, Italy
- 1967 - Bourse de Recherche, Gouvernement du Québec
- 1970 - Ile Festival International de Peinture, Cagnes-sur-Mer, France (Prix National)
- 1975 - Canada Council Senior Arts Grant
- 2002 - Officer of l'Ordre National du Québec
- 2005 - Officer of the Order of Canada
- 2010 - Creation of prix hommage Rita-Letendre de la ville de Drummondville
- 2010 - Governor General's Award in Visual and Media Arts
- 2010 – Honoris Causa Ph D – University of Montreal
- 2012 – Recipient of the Queen Elizabeth II Diamond Jubilee Medal
- 2016 – Member of the Order of Ontario

== Solo shows ==
Letendre has had many solo shows, both nationally and internationally. Among them, some of the most important were the following:

- 1974 Rita Letendre : Palm Springs Desert Museum, Palm Springs, California
- 1989 Rita Letendre : the Montréal years, 1953-1963 = les années montréalaises, 1953-1963, Concordia Art Gallery, Montreal
- 2001 Rita Letendre : Les Elements - The Elements, Galerie Simon Blais, Montreal
- 2003 Rita Letendre : aux couleurs du jour, Musée national des beaux-arts du Québec
- 2005 Rita Letendre: Beginnings in Abstraction, Robert McLaughlin Gallery, Oshawa, Ontario
- 2013 Rita Letendre, Gallery Gevik, Toronto
- 2017 Rita Letendre: Fire & Light, Art Gallery of Ontario, Toronto
- 2021 Rita Letendre: Lines of Strength, Musée du Bas-Saint-Laurent, Rivière-du-Loup
- 2022 Rita Letendre: Eternal Space, Carolyn Campagna Kleefeld Contemporary Art Museum in California State University Long Beach in conjunction with the completion of restoration on Letendre's 1965 mural Sunforce.

Among her other solo shows were:

- 1955 Galerie L'Echourie, Montreal
- 1956 Galerie L'Actuelle, Montreal
- 1959 Galerie Denyse Delrue, Montreal (also 1961)
- 1961 Museé des Beaux-Arts, Montreal
- 1961 Here and Now Gallery, Toronto and when Dorothy Cameron changed the name to Dorothy Cameron Gallery, Letendre had shows there (1962, 1963)
- 1969 Gordon Gallery, Tel-Aviv, Israel
- 1972 The Arwin Gallery, Detroit
- 1972 Museé d'Art Contemporain, Montreal
- 1980 Centre Culturel de Drummondville (also 1998)
- 2001 Centre d'exposition de Baie-Saint-Paul
- 2003 Musée du Québec (also 2004)
- 2004 Winnipeg Art Gallery

== Major collections ==
Letendre's work is in many public collections in Canada such as the National Gallery of Canada, Ottawa; the Art Gallery of Ontario, Toronto; the Robert McLaughlin Gallery, Oshawa, Ontario; the City of Burnaby Permanent Art Collection; and many museums in the United States.

== Record sale prices ==
Rita Letendre's large oil Reflet d'Eden (1961), hammered down at C$375,000 ($296,000) at the Heffel Auction, June 1st 2022. With fees the price came to C$451,250 ($356,000), a record for the late artist and some four times its low estimate.

== Personal life ==
In her early life, Letendre's father worked as a mechanic and obtained trucking contracts when possible, but life for her family was difficult and they lived in poverty. Following a serious injury to one of her fingers in 1931, Letendre was sent to live with Marianna Ledoux, her maternal grandmother, in Saint-Francois-du-Lac. There, she thrived in a more relaxed atmosphere where she could play, read, pick flowers, take boat rides and more importantly, escape her turbulent home life. The planned visit was to last for a year but continued until she was old enough to attend school. At school, Rita was fascinated, this being her first opportunity to be stimulated intellectually. In 1935, the family moved to Saint-Majorique-de-Grantham, near Drummondville, where integration to the community was difficult – here, she and her siblings (being of Abenaki heritage on their father's side) experienced the prejudices experienced by many First Nations children that were incessant and often violent. Although she learned to defend herself well, she ultimately preferred solitude. To escape the hate that surrounded her, she created her own happier worlds, drawn in her schoolbooks.

In 1941, the family moved back to Drummondville where she enrolled in her first year of high school but before she could return for a second year, the family moved to downtown Montreal and Letendre had to stay home to take care of her five younger siblings while both of her parents took jobs for the war effort. This period of her life was a blessing in disguise; she continued drawing in the evenings, she was able to devour books as fast as she could get her hands on them, she discovered Opera on the radio which became a lifelong love, and she discovered famous master works of art in books at the library which she had heard about on the radio. By 1946 she was desperate to escape her family duties; first taking a factory job, then working as a restaurant cashier, she left home to live with her boyfriend with whom she had a son, Jacques. It did not last and Rita separated from Jacques' father — Jacques was eventually raised by his maternal grandmother.

Wanda Nanibush writes of Letendre who said that she had "an overwhelming rage that nothing could hold back" that inspired her with the desire to be a great painter - that Letendre's rage could have been inspired by the discrimination she experienced for being Abenaki and for being a woman in the "ridiculous world". Nanibush believes Letendre's rage inspired her painting. Fire became her trademark, writes Nanibush.

On November 20, 2021, Rita Letendre died of blood cancer.
