= Denis Juneau =

Canadian artist (1925–2014)

- Born: 30 September 1925; Verdun, Quebec, Canada
- Died: October 6, 2014 (aged 89); Montreal, Quebec, Canada
- Known for: painter, sculptor, designer
- Movement: Plasticien
- Awards: Prix Paul-Émile-Borduas
- Website: denisjuneau.com

Denis Juneau RCA (September 30, 1925 – October 6, 2014) was a Canadian painter and a leading figure in the Canadian plasticien movement.

== Biography ==
Juneau was born in Verdun, Quebec, Canada in 1925. He studied at the École des Beaux-Arts de Montréal, with the guidance of Alfred Pellan, amongst others, and became a notorious figure in the new wave of artists that Quebec was to produce in the era of the late 1950s and early 1960s.

The third child of 5, Juneau contracted meningitis at the age of 18 months, resulting in total deafness. In addition, he contracted poliomyelitis at age 3, which paralysed his right leg. Later, he went on to study in Italy, at the Sculoa di Disegno di Novara from 1954 to 1956. From Italy, he also retained a body language that was to characterize him for the rest of his long life.

After his return to Montreal in 1956, he took part in a collective exhibition at the Denyse Delrue gallery, with other young painters of his generation. Two years later he had his first of many personal exhibitions in the same gallery.

Juneau was recognized as one of the plasticien (or hard edge) painters such as Guido Molinari, Fernand Toupin, Claude Tousignant and Fernand Leduc. All through the 1960s, 1970s and part of the 1980s, he remained faithful to that form of painting until a year stay in Paris (1982), when he slowly turned to a more fluid and free style of expression. A prolific artist, he also produced many sculptures, designed symbols and logos, such as the one for the Université de Montréal. His work has been shown in museums world wide. In 1986, he was the first artist to be awarded the Gershon Iskowitz prize. In 1987 The National Gallery of Canada presented a solo exhibition of his work. The Musée national des beaux-arts du Québec held an important retrospective of his paintings and sculptures in 2001.

Juneau received the Prix Paul-Émile-Borduas, awarded by the government of Quebec in 2008. He was made a member of the Royal Canadian Academy of Arts.

Juneau died of pneumonia on October 6, 2014, at the Hôpital Notre-Dame in Montreal.

== See also ==
- Plasticien
- Prix Paul-Émile-Borduas
- Gershon Iskowitz
