= Jean-Paul Jérôme =

Canadian artist (1928–2004)

- Born: February 18, 1928; Montreal, Quebec
- Died: August 14, 2004 (aged 76); Montreal, Quebec
- Education: École des Beaux-Arts de Montréal (1944-1949)
- Known for: member of Les Plasticiens
- Website: jeanpauljerome.com

Jean-Paul Jérôme RCA (February 18, 1928 – August 14, 2004) was a painter, designer and sculptor, who was a co-founder of Les Plasticiens in 1955. He was a key figure in Quebec's abstract art scene of the second half of the 20th century.

== Career ==
Jérôme was born in Montreal and attended the École des Beaux-Arts de Montréal (1944-1949). Among his subjects at the school was fresco painting with Stanley Cosgrove. Later, while working at Radio Canada in props and as a decorator, Jérôme's paintings were shown in the annual Art Association of Montreal Spring Shows (1951-1953), in the Quebec Provincial Exhibition of 1952 and in a first solo show at the Montreal Museum of Fine Arts (1954). He also met Louis Belzile, Fernand Toupin and Rodolphe de Repentigny (Jauran)).

In 1955 he joined with Belzile, Jauran and Toupin to write the "Manifeste des Plasticiens", a reaction against the paintings of Borduas and his followers towards more geometric structure and control. In 1956 Jérôme became a member of The Non-Figurative Artists' Association of Montreal.

He travelled to Paris in 1956 and remained there till 1958, also travelling to Italy, Switzerland and Austria. While abroad, he met Giacometti and Vasarely and found he shared with artist René Mortensen and others an affinity for a harmony between shapes and colours. He also learned from the wide variety of artists he met about the multitude of approaches open to abstraction.

In 1957 he had a solo show at Galerie Arnaud in Paris. Upon Jérôme's return to Montreal, he taught visual arts at the École des Beaux-Arts in Montreal. He had a solo show at Denyse Delrue Gallery in 1959 for which Montreal professor and writer Jean Simard wrote the catalogue and said that he had seen the works in the show in Paris and he had been struck by Jérôme's Canadian and specifically northern colour. In 1960, Jérôme had a solo show of abstract pastels at Galerie Libre followed by numerous exhibitions at private and public galleries. When he retired from teaching in 1973 he set up a large studio in his former family home and continued making nonrepresentational art. In 1978, he was made a member of the Royal Canadian Academy of Arts.

In 2001, the Musée du Bas Saint-Laurent had a retrospective exhibition titled Jean-Paul Jérôme: modern vibrations of his paintings and in 2005, the Musée des Beaux Arts de Sherbrooke devoted a retrospective to the Plasticiens. A documentary film titled Jean-Paul Jérôme: Color, Light, Form was made about Jérôme's work which was shown at the Festival International du Film sur l'Art de Québec in 2018. The Musée d’art contemporain de Baie-Saint-Paul held an exhibition of his work in 2019 and also in 2019, the Joliette Art Museum held an exhibition titled Jean-Paul Jérôme: The Lyrical Abstractions.

== Selected public collections ==
- National Gallery of Canada;
- Musee d’art contemporain de Montréal;
- Musée national des beaux-arts du Québec;
