= George E. Russell =

Canadian painter

George Ellis Russell (January 23, 1933 – May 8, 2016) was a Canadian painter and art teacher known for his philanthropy. His hexagonal paintings are filled with geometric shapes and pure colours. Creating hundred of artworks in his signature hexagonal format, his work is in the same family as Les Plasticiens, a close relative to Claude Tousignant's circles and Guido Molinari's stripes. His art was also strongly influenced by the Op Art mouvement.

== Early life and training ==
Russell was born in Viscount, Saskatchewan.

His formal training began at the Emma Lake Artists' Workshops (affiliated with the Art department of University of Saskatchewan) where the influential art critic Clement Greenberg presented the work of Morris Louis, Jules Olitski, and Kenneth Noland to a Canadian audience in 1962. Russell was influenced by Modernist styles in painting and sculpture emerging in Saskatchewan at that time which he credited to both the presence of American-educated art professors and the frequent visits of Clement Greenberg.

He later pursued a Masters of Art at Concordia University in 1969. This change in location provided the opportunity to discover Quebec's erupting artistic scene post Refus Global. It was then that his practice became transformed to one involving abstraction and geometry.

Though not a member, his work is closely associated with those of the Plasticien movement.

== Critical reception ==
In 2010, a retrospective of Russell's work entitled Kaleidoscope et Rétrospective was presented jointly by Maison des arts in Laval and Galerie Luz in Montreal. In the accompanying monograph, the art historian Martin Champagne wrote:

"The work of George E. Russell constitutes a point of encounter between two artistic cultures, not only in the geographical sense—if we consider that his work nourishes itself from two remote artistic scenes: one situated in his homeland Saskatchewan, and the other in Quebec, his adopted land- but also in the temporal sense, taking into account that his work transcends the geometrical abstraction of the 70's to integrate aesthetic notions of open work, interaction of media, and the participation of the spectators, fundamental characteristics of Contemporary Art."

In 2015, he was contacted by the development director of the Quebec Arthritis Society, Elizabeth Kennell. He had long been a monetary donor to the charity and Kennell inquired about a painting donation. When Russell offered to donate his entire collection, Kennell reached out to Yolande Racine, a former curator at the Montreal Museum of Fine Arts, for her opinion. Racine confirmed that Russell was an "accomplished artist [who] has created a composition code oscillating between the expression of reality and illusion, between the figurative and the abstract." Alan Klinkoff, the owner of a gallery specializing in Canadian art also judged Russell to be "a highly accomplished artistic talent." The Arthritis Society ended up raising $70,000 from the sale of his work.

Russell died from cancer on May 8, 2016, in Laval, Quebec.

Russell's work has continued to be shown after his death. In 2017, Grosvenor Park United Church rediscovered and repaired a two-panel piece that Russell had donated when he attended in the late 1960s. The ELLEPHANT gallery exhibited a series of serigraphs, watercolors and canvases during the 2020 Pictura art fair in Montreal.
