= Suzy Lake =

Artist

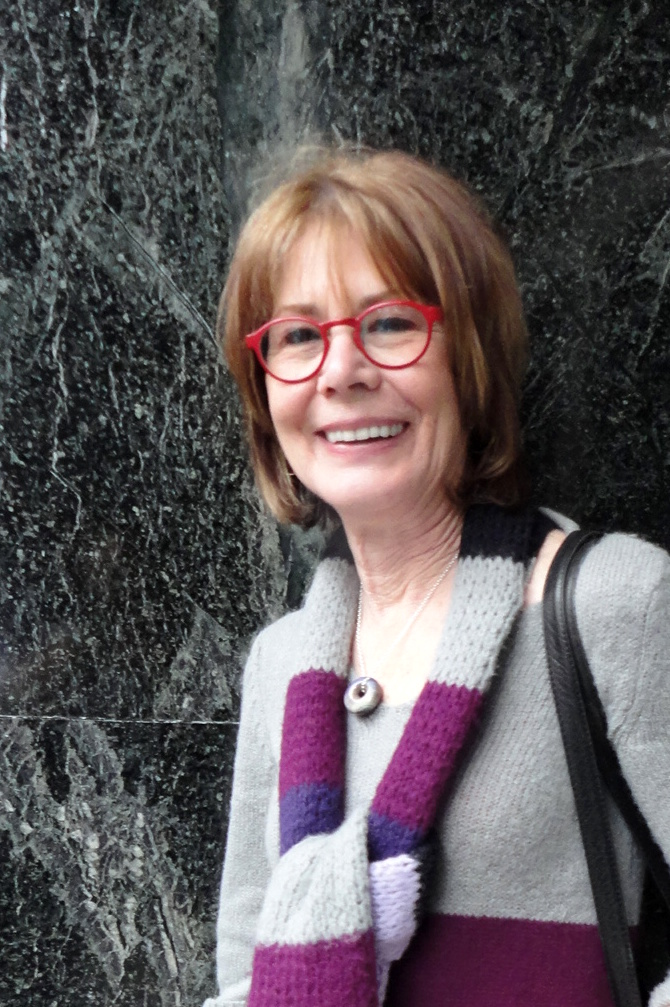
- Suzy Lake outside the Galerie Donald Browne, Montreal, before her 2011 exhibition Reduced Performing
- Born: June 24, 1947 (age 79); Detroit, United States
- Education: Wayne State University, Concordia University
- Known for: Photographer, conceptual artist
- Website: suzylake.ca

Suzy Lake RCA (born June 24, 1947) is an American-Canadian artist based in Toronto, Canada, who is known for her work as a photographer, performance artist and video producer. Using a range of media, Lake explores topics including identity, beauty, gender and aging. She is regarded as a pioneering feminist artist and a staunch political activist.

== Life ==
Lake was born in Detroit, Michigan. She began her fine art studies at Wayne State University and Western Michigan University in Kalamazoo, Michigan, from 1965 to 1968. During this period, she became involved with the anti-war and civil rights movements of the 1960s. She also witnessed the Detroit Race Riots of 1967. Soon after, in 1968 Lake emigrated to Canada with her husband to escape the Vietnam War draft. Settling in Montreal, she found herself amidst social upheaval as a result of the Quiet Revolution.

Originally a painter, in Montreal Lake began experimenting with photography, using herself as a model. She completed a Master of Fine Arts degree at Concordia University in 1980.

Lake taught at the University of Guelph from the 1980s until her retirement in 2008, when she was given the title Professor Emerita.

== Artistic impact ==
Using costumes, make-up and props, Lake creates photo-based self-portraits, often by assuming new identities. Her adopted personas highlight the possibilities for deception involved in posing for the camera. An example is "Suzy Lake As Patty Hearst", a project Lake made in collaboration with Bill Jones, featuring the artist as the eponymous Hearst. American artist Cindy Sherman has cited Lake's photo-performance as an influence on her work.

Suzy Lake has twenty-five portfolios of her artwork. Each deals with politics of gender, identity and beauty. She creates art to express how what she does relates to what she is or to what people think she is. She uses her photographs, videos, and performances to draw attention to social norms and constraints.

Lake explained in an interview that she always uses herself in her art because this is how she develops understanding of social restrictions for women.

Lake uses art to control her own representation. Her earlier On Stage photos were influenced by Detroit. In these, Lake photographed herself as a wife and mother but later she wanted to make work to reverse that. In Montréal, Lake observed a marked power difference between genders, and she stated that women have a "glass ceiling" that led to her Choreographed Puppet photos. More recently, Lake introduced a new vision of beauty by displaying her older body in her portfolio entitled "Beauty and the Aging Body."

== Work ==
Lake lived in Montréal for about ten years. She taught at the Montreal Museum School (1969–1978) and was mentored by the Minimalist artist, Guido Molinari. She was active in the early conceptualist art scene there. In 1971, Lake became a co-founder (with twelve other artists) of the artist-run gallery Véhicule Art Inc. Lake's work during this period was influenced by photo-based artists (including Les Levine) who were using the camera to represent an idea rather than documenting reality. This was also a period when Lake began to concentrate on the subject of identity. In her 1973 series of photographs entitled A One Hour (Zero) Conversation with Allan B., she is the subject as the camera records her expression at various intervals of a candid conversation with a friend. To emphasize her expressions, Lake used white face make-up. She then invited her friends and family to circle which of the photographs most represented her personality. Much of her work in the 1970s featured herself as a subject, including works such as Choreographed Puppets, 1976–77.

Lake moved to Toronto in 1978, and became involved in the growing contemporary photography community. From the mid-1980s until 1994, Lake ceased appearing as the subject of her work as she turned her attention to more direct forms of camera activism. Among her notable works from this period is a series of photographs she created in collaboration with the Teme-Augama Anishnabai Band of Bear Island in Temagami, Ontario, to bring greater public awareness to their land claim.

Lake continues to make work about the female body, now focusing on ageing. She exhibits her work worldwide.

== Issues ==
In an interview in Magenta magazine, Lake noted the influence of the political climate of the 1970s on her work. She stated: "I know that I am a feminist, but I can see that my politics originated in human rights issues, civil rights, the FLQ in Quebec and race issues in the States." In 2006, Roberta Smith of the New York Times compared her work to that of Cindy Sherman; however, Thomas Micchelli, reviewing the feminist collection of the Vienna-based Verbund AG for Hyperallergic.com asserts that Lake was an influence on the latter in school. The two artists were contemporaries in the 1970s and in 1975 Sherman invited Lake to exhibit in a Hallwalls show in New York.

The artist's performances are often considered to be influenced by other prominent performance movements at the time such as Fluxus happenings. As a dedicated anti-war activist, Lake supported Hans Haacke and other artists working in the Institutional Critique movement to counter cultural support for the Vietnam War effort. Lake's work became more explicitly activist in the later 1980s, which many credit to her friendship with the Teme-Augama Anishnabai of Bear Island, for whom she produced a series of work in the early 1990s.

Lake was considered an early example of body art, due to the physicality of many of her performances. While living in Montreal, Lake collaborated with a number of prominent theater and performance groups including the Judson Dance Theater to create performances exploring the interactions of human bodies and inanimate objects in the built environment. Other works by Lake explore the relationship between the body and authority, often through the act of destruction.

== Major exhibitions ==
Lake was the subject of a comprehensive retrospective exhibition, Introducing Suzy Lake, at the Art Gallery of Ontario in 2014–15 curated by Georgiana Uhlyarik. In 2016, she received the Scotiabank Photography Award. This resulted in another survey exhibition curated by Gaëlle Morel at the Ryerson Image Center (RIC) in Toronto, as part of the 2017 Contact Photography Festival.

=== Selected exhibitions ===
- Suzy Lake: Political Poetics, University of Toronto Art Centre
- Donna: Feminist Avant-Garde of the 1970s, from Sammlung Verbund, Vienna Galleria nazionale d'arte moderna, Rome
- Traffic: Conceptual Art in Canada, 1965–1980, Art Gallery of Alberta, Justina M. Barnicke Gallery, University of Toronto and the Vancouver Art Gallery
- Identity Theft: Eleanor Antin, Lynn Hershman and Suzy Lake, Santa Monica Museum of Art, Santa Monica, CA
- WACK! Art and the Feminist Revolution 1965–1980, Los Angeles, CA Museum of Contemporary Art/Geffen Contemporary, National Museum of Women in Art, DC
- Faking Death: Canadian Art Photography and the Canadian Imagination, Jack Shainman Gallery, New York, NY
- The Unseen Cindy Sherman Early Transformations (1975–1976), Montclair Art Museum; Montclair, New Jersey

=== Selected public collections ===
- Sammlung Verbund, Vienna
- Musée d'Art Contemporain, Montréal, QC
- Art Gallery of Hamilton, Hamilton, Ontario
- Musée national des beaux-arts du Québec, QC
- Winnipeg Art Gallery, Winnipeg, MB
- Southern Alberta Art Gallery, Lethbridge, AB
- Vancouver Art Gallery, Vancouver
- Glenbow Museum, Calgary
- Canadian Museum of Contemporary Photography, Ottawa, ON
- Montreal Museum of Fine Art, Montréal, QC
- Museum Lodz, Poland
- Art Gallery of Ontario, Toronto, ON
- Buffalo AKG Art Museum, Buffalo, New York

== Honours ==
Suzy Lake is a member of the Royal Canadian Academy of Arts. In 2016, she was a recipient of Governor General's Award in Visual and Media Arts. and the Scotiabank Photography Award.

== Gallery representation ==
She has been represented by Galerie Gilles Gheerbrant (1974–1977); Jared Sable Gallery (1976–1990), Paul Petro Contemporary Art (1995 – 2012) Georgia Scherman Projects, Toronto (2012 – ?); Solway Jones Gallery, Los Angeles (2009 – ?); and Galerie Donald Browne, Montréal (2010 – ?). She is currently represented by Bradley Ertaskiran, Montreal (2024 - )

== See also ==
- "Suzy Lake: Interview With A Maker of Change" BY BILL CLARKE, MARCH 5, 2013
