= Louis Belzile =

Canadian artist (1929–2019)

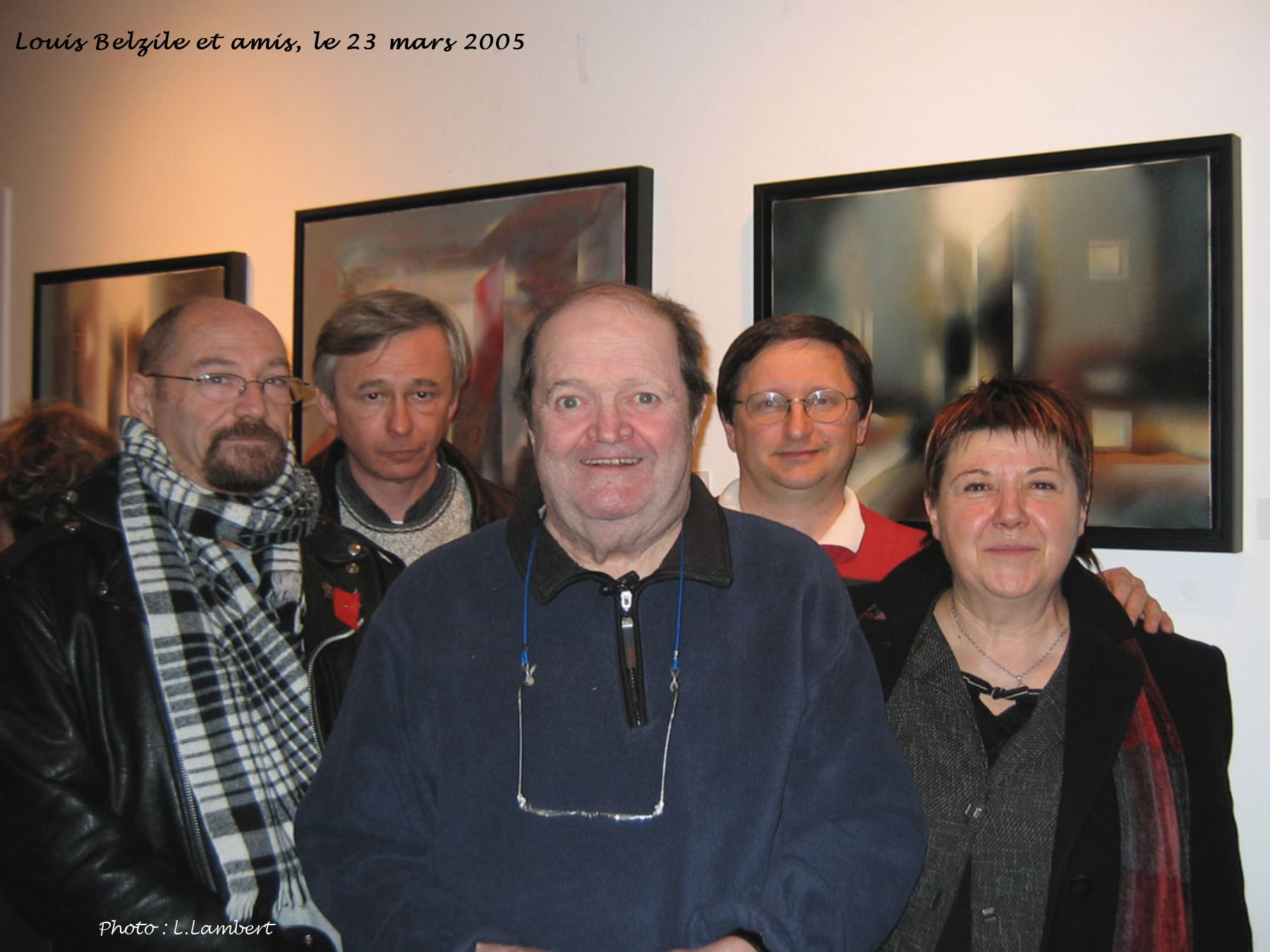
- Louis Belzile (center) and friends in 2005
- Born: April 17, 1929; Rimouski, Quebec, Canada
- Died: February 12, 2019 (aged 89)
- Education: OCAD (1948–1952); with André Lhote in Paris (1953); Bachelor of Arts at the University of Montreal (1958); École des Beaux-Arts in Montreal (1960–1961)
- Spouse: Pierrette Trudel
- Elected: founding member of the Association of The Non-Figurative Artists' Association of Montreal

Louis Belzile (April 17, 1929 – February 12, 2019) was one of the main figures in geometric abstraction in painting in Quebec and one of the members of the Plasticiens group in Montreal along with Rodolphe de Repentigny (Jauran), Jean-Paul Jérôme and Fernand Toupin.

== Career ==
Louis Belzile was born in Rimouski, Quebec. He studied at the Ontario College of Art with Jock Macdonald and Carl Schaefer from 1948 to 1952 and with André Lhote in Paris in 1952–1953. On his return to Quebec, he settled in Montreal where he met Jean-Paul Jérôme, Fernand Toupin and Rodolphe de Repentigny (Jauran). They signed the Manifeste des Plasticiens in 1955, which read, in part (in translation):

"The Plasticians attach themselves […] to plastic facts: tone, texture, colors, shapes, lines, final unity that is the painting, and to the relationships between these elements".

In the 1950s, he used geometric forms and harmonious tones in his abstract painting to create, as the manifesto said, an equilibrium between form and colour. In his later work, he studied the way light fell on evanescent plastic forms. Much later, he made sculpture such as Les trois âges (1987), which recalls miniature architecture.

In 1956, Belzile became a founding member of The Non-Figurative Artists' Association of Montreal. In 1958, he obtained a Bachelor of Arts at the University of Montreal. In 1960–1961, he studied at the École des Beaux-Arts in Montreal. He then taught at the Saint-Joseph teachers' college until 1965. From 1965 to 1985, alongside his career as an artist, Belzile had a distinguished career in the civil service, at the Ministry of Education.

In 1980, Martin O'Hara published The Privileged Moment An Interview with Louis Belzile in the McGill Journal of Education. In 2005, André Desrochers made the film L'intuition intuitionnée about the work of the Plasticiens.

Belzile died on February 12, 2019, the last survivor of the first group of Plasticiens.

== Selected exhibitions ==
- Musée d'Art Moderne de Paris (1965);
- Belzile: ordre et liberté (Retrospective), Musée du Bas-Saint-Laurent, Rivière-du-Loup, (Québec) (1996)
- Les Plasticiens, Musée des beaux-arts de Sherbrooke (2005)
- La question de l'abstraction, MACM (2012)
- The Plasticiens and Beyond: Montréal 1955–1970, co-produced and circulated by the Musée national des beaux-arts du Québec and the Varley Art Gallery of Markham (2013), curated by Roald Nasgaard and Michel Martin. The exhibition was accompanied by a publication including texts by the two co-curators and others by Lise Lamarche and Denise Leclerc.
- Hommage aux Plasticiens, Galerie Simon Blais, 2020

== Public collections ==
Many public institutions in Canada have works by Belzile in their collection such as the National Gallery of Canada, the Art Gallery of Ontario, the Confederation Centre Art Gallery as well as museums in Quebec like the Musée national des beaux-arts du Québec, the MACM (Musée d’art contemporain de Montréal), the Musée des beaux-arts de Sherbrooke and the Musée du Bas Saint-Laurent.

== Bibliography ==
- Viau, R. (2005). Le manifeste des plasticiens. Vie des Arts, 50(200). pp. 38–40.
- Nasgaard, Roald; Martin, Michel; Lamarche, Lise; Leclerc, Denise (2013). Les plasticiens et les années 1950-60. Quebec: Musée national des beaux-arts du Québec. OCLC 830024393.
