= The Indian Church (painting) =

1929 painting by Emily Carr

- Church at Yuquot Village
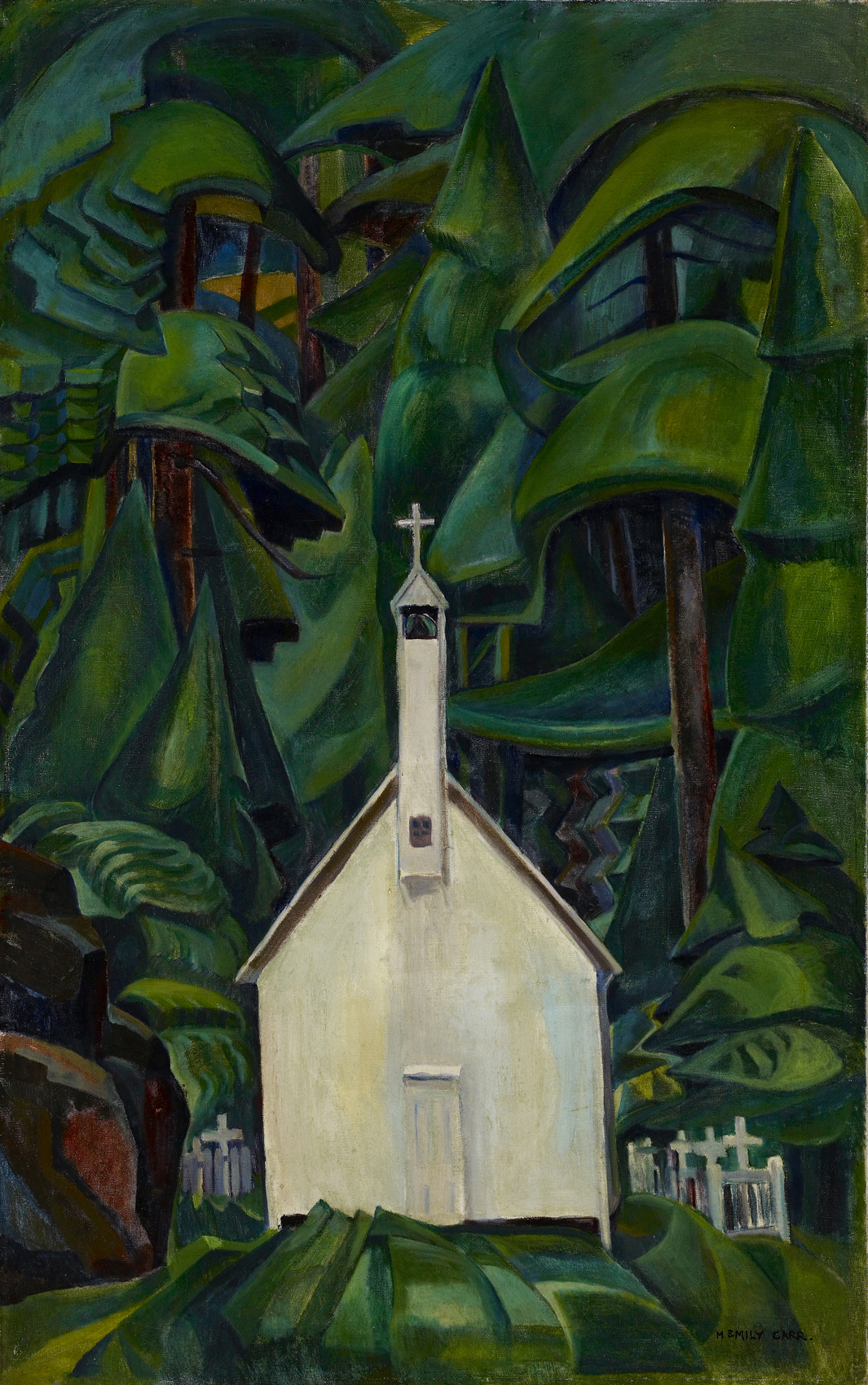
- Artist: Emily Carr
- Year: 1929
- Medium: Oil on canvas
- Dimensions: 108.6 cm × 68.9 cm (42.8 in × 27.1 in)
- Location: Art Gallery of Ontario, Toronto

The Indian Church (renamed Church at Yuquot Village in 2018 by the Art Gallery of Ontario) is a 1929 painting by the Canadian artist Emily Carr. Group of Seven artist Lawren Harris bought the painting to showcase it in his dining room, and called it Carr's best work. In 1930, the work was shown in the Fifth Annual Exhibition of Canadian Art organised by the National Gallery of Canada. In 1938, the painting was chosen for an exhibition titled A Century of Canadian Art, at the Tate Gallery. The exhibition was described by Vincent Massey as "a most representative showing of Canadian painting and sculpture, including all schools and all periods."

The Indian Church is considered a "transitional" painting because it reflects the transition of Carr's artistic work from purely depicting Native Art to shifting her focus toward the land. In her 1946 autobiography, Growing Pains, Carr wrote that she "felt the subject deeply". She painted it at Friendly Cove, near a lighthouse.

When Carr saw her painting in Harris's home, she exclaimed: "The house must have bewitched this thing! It was better than I had thought." However she could not continue to look at it, because people in the room were saying kind things and she could not accept praise and felt embarrassed when others complimented her about her work.

The Indian Church is one of Carr's most reproduced works, and was donated to the Art Gallery of Ontario by Charles Band upon his death in 1969.

== Creation ==
In the spring of 1929, Carr travelled by train through Vancouver Island to Port Alberni from where she went by steamer to Nootka Island. There she sketched, among other subjects, a small white church that was in the area. When she returned to Victoria, she started painting crosses around the church, creating the impression of a graveyard. In the painting, she omitted adding any other buildings near the church, as was the case with the actual church, to emphasise the isolation of the church within its green environment. She also added an element of danger in the form of wavy dark green undergrowth erupting in front of the church.

== Reception and analysis ==
Group of Seven artist Lawren Harris was enthusiastic about Carr's painting. He communicated this opinion to her by telling her that when he sent her painting to an American art exhibition, he thought that it was the "best thing there" and that he thought that she could not surpass it. Carr had difficulty receiving praise from others because for most of her life she was criticized and praise was not something she was familiar with. When Harris praised her drawing to such a great extent, she had trouble accepting his enthusiastic words about it; she was offended by Harris's remark, which she perceived as a comment implying that her talent was limited. She commented that "she was sick of that old church. I do not want to hear any more about it!"

Harris understood the effect of his remark on Carr and did not comment further about the painting to her, although he still sent her encouraging messages because he was convinced that the Indian Church provided strong evidence that Carr had transcended the limits of simply illustrating Aboriginal Canadian Art. Recalling the incident with Harris about the painting, Carr wrote in her autobiography: "Just once was I angry with him. That was over a canvas, painted by myself, entitled The Indian Church".

Lewis Desoto describes the painting as "a simplified white church which is dwarfed by the sculptural forms of the surrounding forest. There is something a little sentimental and obvious in it, and yet it speaks to so many people as an image, not only of a habitation in the vastness of nature, but also of the human in the universal."

Canadian poet Kate Braid comments "[Carr] added a breath of danger. In the final painting, Indian Church, dark slices of undergrowth rush like waves up to the front door of the small white church. And yet it stands, holding its cross like a wobbling Christian soldier, almost burning with a clear interior light – a Lawren Harris light – against the green waves that threaten to drown it." Braid goes on to comment that " Perhaps it is no coincidence that this painting was bought by Lawren Haris, who praised it lavishly, saying that Emily would never do better." The latter remark angered Carr who retorted "[she] certainly would do even better paintings in the future!"

Art Canada Institute writer Lisa Baldissera comments "In Indian Church, one of Carr's most important works, a dense wall of forest engulfs the church, which Carr paints in vivid white, a stark contrast to the dark forest. Against this backdrop the church is miniaturized, signifying both the incursion and the vulnerability of the new beliefs introduced by the settler population." Baldissera also comments that the crosses surrounding the church indicate an effect similar to "time-lapse photography", symbolizing the movement of the cross at the church steeple as if it were falling and multiplying to mark the graves on the side of the church. According to the reviewer, the crosses also symbolize the parishioners and also serve to signal the failed mission of the church. Baldissera also comments that "[t]he building's windowless walls and reduced features create another "marker," suggesting a structure that is both monolithic and uninhabitable."

Ann Davis comments that Carr, at the time of the painting's creation, was interested in finding out more about the nature of God and the methods she could use to portray that nature in a painting. Davis remarks "The flat front of the building and the geometric crispness of its shape contrast markedly with the organic volume of the tree boughs and the shallow recession into the forest. Yet somehow there is accommodation between nature's house and God's house. Neither one entirely overpowers or dominates the other." Davis concludes that with the painting "Carr achieves a new integration. She has tied the idea and the picture together in a new and convincing way."

Margaret Hirst comments "Carr's longing for union with God is palpable. A small Christian church is set amidst an enormous forest, slightly cubist in form, which obscures the sky. The foliage forms a subtle totem-like facial profile nudging the right side of the steeple, suggesting Carr's transitional religious frame of mind and her mission to unite God and nature."

== 2018 change of name ==
In 2018, 73 years after Carr's death, the Art Gallery of Ontario retitled the painting to Church at Yuquot Village due to the supposed negative connotations of the term "Indian". Jan Ross, the curator of the Emily Carr House, criticised the renaming of the painting, saying that "renaming a work in contradiction with the artist's intentions is tantamount to 'censorship'." She added "That is sacrosanct. It robs the artist... I think it behooves us to examine things within the context of their day."

Georgiana Uhlyarik, Curator of Canadian Art at the Art Gallery of Ontario, argues that a title change does not change history but rather the new title is "descriptive" and reflects the gallery's "effort to 'contextualize' Carr's painting". Uhlyarik and the Curator of Indigenous Art Wanda Nanibush, who together headed the Canadian and Indigenous Art department, developed a curatorial approach to "open up a conversation about colonial history", working to remove "hurtful and painful" terminology "on a case-by-case basis".
