= Jean-Paul Mousseau =

- Born: Jean-Paul-Armand Mousseau; January 1, 1927; Quebec, Canada
- Died: February 7, 1991 (aged 64)
- Occupation: Artist
- Spouse(s): Denise Guilbault (Dyne Mousso, actress)

Jean-Paul Mousseau (January 1, 1927 – February 7, 1991) was a Quebec artist. He was a student of Paul-Émile Borduas, a member of the Automatist group and a founding member of The Non-Figurative Artists' Association of Montreal.

== Career ==
Jean-Paul Mousseau was born in Montreal and studied painting there at the College Notre-Dame at the age of thirteen, Interior Decoration at the École du Meuble (1945–1946); and painting with Paul-Émile Borduas (1946–1951). He first exhibited his work in 1944, after joining the Contemporary Art Society and as a member of the Automatistes, in the first Automatist exhibition in 1946. In 1948, he was one of the signatories of the Refus global manifesto. In 1953 he was an exhibitor in Les Automatistes at the Place des Arts, Montreal, and in 1955 his painting La Marseillaise won first prize in the Winnipeg Art Show (it was one of two first prizes).

By 1955, Mousseau was exhibiting work similar in aims to Les Plasticiens, a group of artists who had broken away from Les Automatistes to achieve effects through tone, texture, form and line in highly ordered paintings characteristic of the de Stijl group. He exhibited this work in "Espace 55" at the Montreal Museum of Fine Arts in 1955. In 1956, he was one of the founders of The Non-Figurative Artists' Association of Montreal. In 1957, he began exploring new materials such as coloured resin and fibreglass.

At the end of the 1950s, he was one of the first Quebec artists who saw the necessity of integrating art into the urban environment. His most important contributions are his numerous murals and other collaborations with architects, such as his mural (Lumière et mouvement) in the Hydro-Québec building in Montreal for which he won first prize in a competition in 1961. He also designed discotheques. In 1963, 1967, and again in 1997, retrospectives of his work were held (in 1997 curated by Pierre Landry for the Musée d'art contemporain de Montréal with an extensive chronology). He participated in many group shows nationally and internationally including the First Biennial of Canadian Painting (1955); the exhibition of Canadian art at the Canadian Pavilion, Brussels International Exposition, Belgium (1958); as a guest exhibitor of Painters 11 (1958), and in many others. He also designed costumes, posters, scenery and lighting for many important productions of the theatre. His work is included in the collections of the National Gallery of Canada, Ottawa; and the Musée d'art contemporain, among others.

Mousseau died of cancer in 1991.

== Montreal metro ==
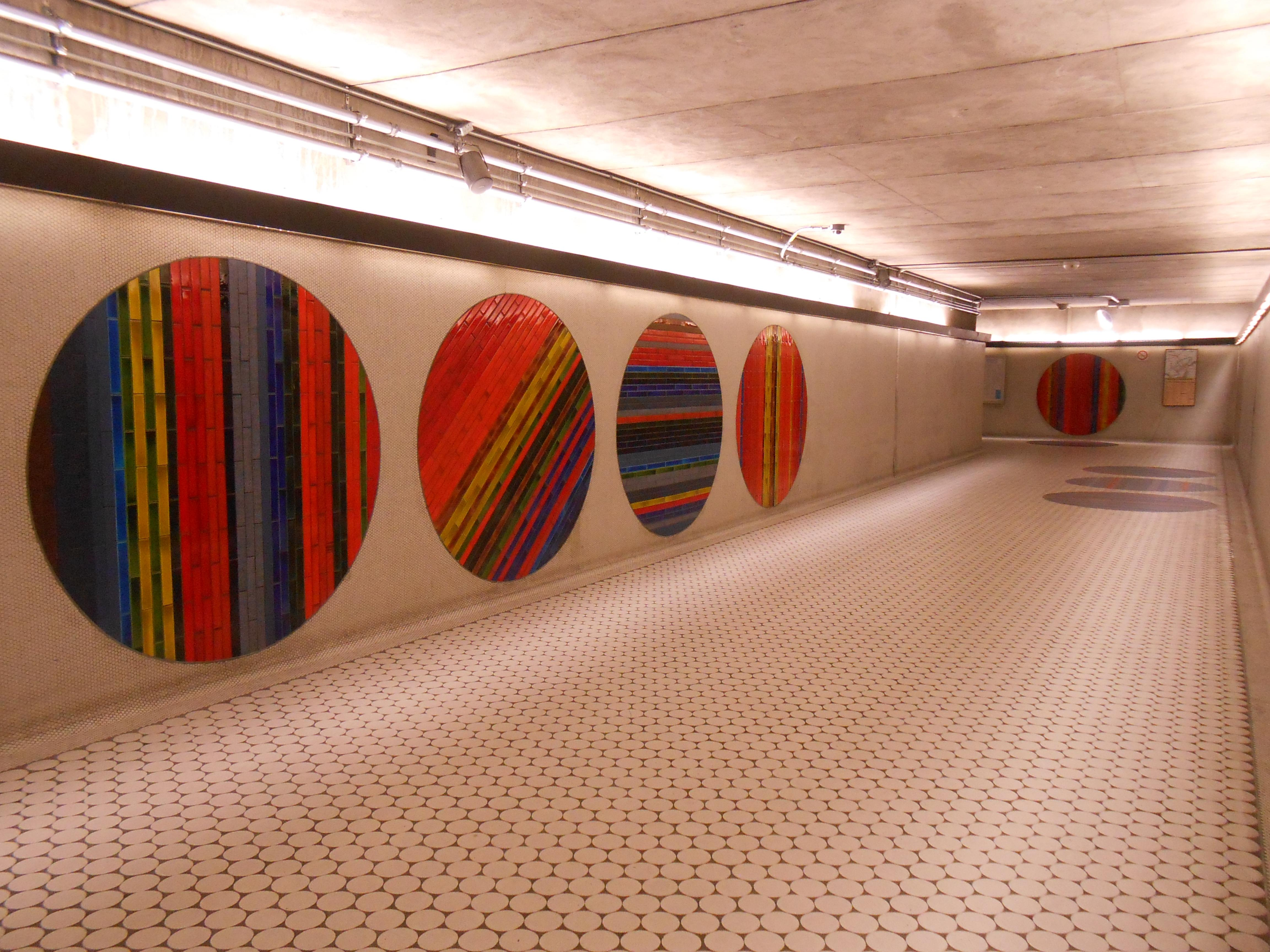
Circles (1966) by Jean-Paul Mousseau, throughout the station Peel, Montreal Metro

Jean-Paul Mousseau did artwork in the Montreal metro. He clashed with the metro's first art director, Robert Lapalme, who insisted that art for the metro be figurative, represent Montreal history, and be sponsored. Mousseau wished to open the doors to non-figurative art integrated into the architecture and accounted for in the construction budget. Lapalme held sway over the initial network, except for two works (Mousseau's Circles at Peel station and Marcelle Ferron's stained glass at Champ-de-Mars).

Mousseau took over as art director after LaPalme, and his influence marked the rest of the network. Most of the artwork was planned in accordance with the architects, and many were by the architects themselves. Works by Mousseau in the metro include the mural Opus 74 at Viau station, two murals at Honoré-Beaugrand, and a mural at Square-Victoria. He also created some sculptural lighting elements in the concert-hall of the Orford Arts Centre, in collaboration with the designer Léonard Garneau, who was in charge of the interior design of the centre. His work is integral to Montreal's airport and several of its skyscrapers.

== Exhibitions ==
- 1945: Montreal Museum of Fine Art
- 1946: 'Automatistes' (first exhibition)
- 1952: "Paintings by Paul-Émile Borduas and by a Group of Younger Quebec Artists", Montreal Museum of Fine Arts
- 1953: "Les Automatistes", Place des Arts, Montreal
- 1954: "La matière chante", Montreal
- 1955: Winnipeg Art Show (first prize); "Espace 55", Montreal Museum of Fine Art; Galerie l'Actuelle, Montreal
- 1956: Galerie l'Actuelle, with Riopelle, Borduas, Sam Francis, Jean McEwen, and others
- 1957: The Non-Figurative Artists' Association of Montreal
- 1959: Association of Non-Figurative Artists, Montreal Museum of Fine Arts
- 1958: "Contemporary Art in Canada", "l'Exposition Universelle de Brussels" of 20 Canadian painters
- 1962: "Festival of the 2 Worlds", Spoleto, Italy
- 1963: "Mousseau: 20 Year Retrospective", St. Laurent College
- 1967: "Jean-Paul Mousseau: Aspects", Musée d'art contemporain de Montréal
- 1971: "Borduas and the Automatistes: 1942–1955", Musée d'art contemporain de Montréal and the Grand Palais, Paris
- 1983: "Association of Non-Figurative Artists of Montreal", Concordia University
- 1997: "Mousseau", Musée d'art contemporain de Montréal

== See also ==
- List of Quebecois
- Pierre Henry (painter)
