= Gary Dufour =

Canadian curator (born 1954)

- Born: 1954; Tisdale, Saskatchewan
- Education: Fine Art, BFA (Distinction), University of Regina; Fine Art (grad. 1976); MFA, Nova Scotia College of Art and Design University (grad. 1979);
- Known for: Curator of Contemporary Art, educator
- Spouse: spouse of Siné MacPherson (b. 1952) (m. 1976)

Gary Dufour (born 1954) is an art historian based in Australia who has taught at the University of Western Australia. He served as the senior curator at the Vancouver Art Gallery (1988–1995) and as chief curator and deputy director of the Art Gallery of Western Australia (1995–2013). He is an expert on contemporary and modern art and, in 2016, was appointed as an approved valuer for the Australian Government's Cultural Gifts Program.

== Career ==
Dufour was born in Tisdale, Saskatchewan. He received his BFA in Fine Art from the University of Regina in Saskatchewan, graduating in 1976, and his MFA at the Nova Scotia College of Art and Design University (NSCAD) in Halifax, graduating in 1979. In 1976 and 1977, he was the Founding Director of the Saskatchewan Craft Council in Regina. In 1980, he was a lecturer at NSCAD, and from 1981 to 1983, he was an assistant professor at the University of Regina.

During the early 1980s, he worked as a sculptor. Curator Michael Parke-Taylor did an exhibition of his work titled Gary Dufour: Belie/F for the Mackenzie Art Gallery in Regina in 1981 (it was reviewed at length in the Regina newspaper) and he had a show of his constructions at Mercer Union in Toronto in 1982. His artwork is now in the collections of Remai Modern, Saskatoon, and the University of Regina.

He moved to Australia in 1983 and became the Curator of Prints & Drawings at the Art Gallery of Western Australia (AGWA) in Perth. From 1987 to 1988, he was Chief Curator at the MacKenzie Art Gallery in Regina, then from 1988 to 1995, he was Senior Curator at the Vancouver Art Gallery. While there, one of his major achievements was a Guido Molinari exhibition in 1989 which he curated and for which he wrote the catalogue, titled Guido Molinari: 1951-1961, Peintures en noir et blanc/ The Black and White Paintings which toured the country. He also organized an exhibition and wrote the catalogue essay for Gerald Ferguson's The Initial Alphabet (1994) as well as being the Foundation curator, Vancouver Art Gallery Archive of Lawrence Weiner Posters.

Afterwards, from 1995 to 2013, he served as Chief Curator | Deputy Director at the Art Gallery of Western Australia. In 1997, he co-curated an exhibition of Allan Sekula for the Vancouver Art Gallery. In 2007, he was the first curator-in-residence ISCP, New York for the Dr. K. David Edwards and Margery Edwards Charitable Trust. From 2013 to 2020, he taught Art History at the University of Western Australia and from 2013 to 2018, he directed the Cruthers Art Foundation (the Cruthers Collection of Women's Art (CCWA) is Australia's largest public collection of women's art). In 2016, he was appointed an approved valuer for the Australian Government’s Cultural Gifts Program. From 2017 to 2018, he was director of the SHEILA A Foundation for Women in Visual Art in Australia and retired as emeritus director.

Dufour has developed extensive contemporary international art collections and commissioned artists such as Christian Boltanski. His fonds is held at the National Art Archive and Capon Research Library, Art Gallery of New South Wales, Sydney and in the "Papers of Howard Taylor" at the Archives and Research Library, National Gallery of Australia, Canberra.

== Writing ==
Dufour edited the State art collection : Art Gallery of Western Australia (1997). He has organized and contributed essays to exhibitions on the art of Canadian, Australian, and International modern and contemporary artists such as Howard Taylor (1985, 1998, 2003), Dan Graham (1985), Max Pam (1986), Frank Nulf (1987), Guido Molinari (1989 and often thereafter), Gerald Ferguson (1994), Jochen Gerz (1994), and most famously, Jeff Wall (1990 and 2012), among others. Dufour also edited Wall's Catalogue Raisonné: 2005-2021. In 2014, he curated the exhibition, wrote the brochure and gave a floor talk for William Kentridge's the REfusal of Time (2012), a video and sculptural installation at the Perth Institute of Contemporary Art.

He has written extensively on Guido Molinari for Heffel Fine Art Auction House Contemporary Art catalogues in Canada since 2017 and most recently on Morris Louis and Kenneth Noland (2024). In 2023 he edited Max Pam; Contingency of Eye Contact A Memoir 1970-1975 published by Editions Bessard, Paris. In 2024, his transcription of Howard Taylor's Journal 1946-2001 which traces his material innovation as a painter will be published by the AGWA.
