= Claude Tousignant =

Canadian artist (born 1932)

- Born: December 23, 1932 (age 93); Montreal, Quebec
- Education: School of Art and Design at the MBAM
- Known for: Painter, Sculptor
- Notable work: "Chromatic accelerator" series
- Movement: Plasticiens, Tachism
- Awards: Officer of the Order of Canada; Governor General's Award in Visual and Media Arts

Claude Tousignant OC RCA (born December 23, 1932, in Montreal, Quebec) is a Canadian artist. Tousignant is considered to be an important contributor to the development of geometric abstraction in Canada. He masterly used alternating values of complementary colours in innovative ways in his circle/target paintings. He was a "creative force in Montreal for over seven decades".

== Biography ==
Claude Tousignant was born in Montreal, Quebec. From 1948 to 1951, he attended the School of Art and Design at the Montreal Museum of Fine Arts where he studied under Arthur Lismer, Louis Archambault, Marian Dale Scott, Jacques de Tonnancour and Gordon Webber. He then travelled to Paris where he studied at the Académie Ranson, returning to Montreal in the spring of 1952.

== Artistic career ==
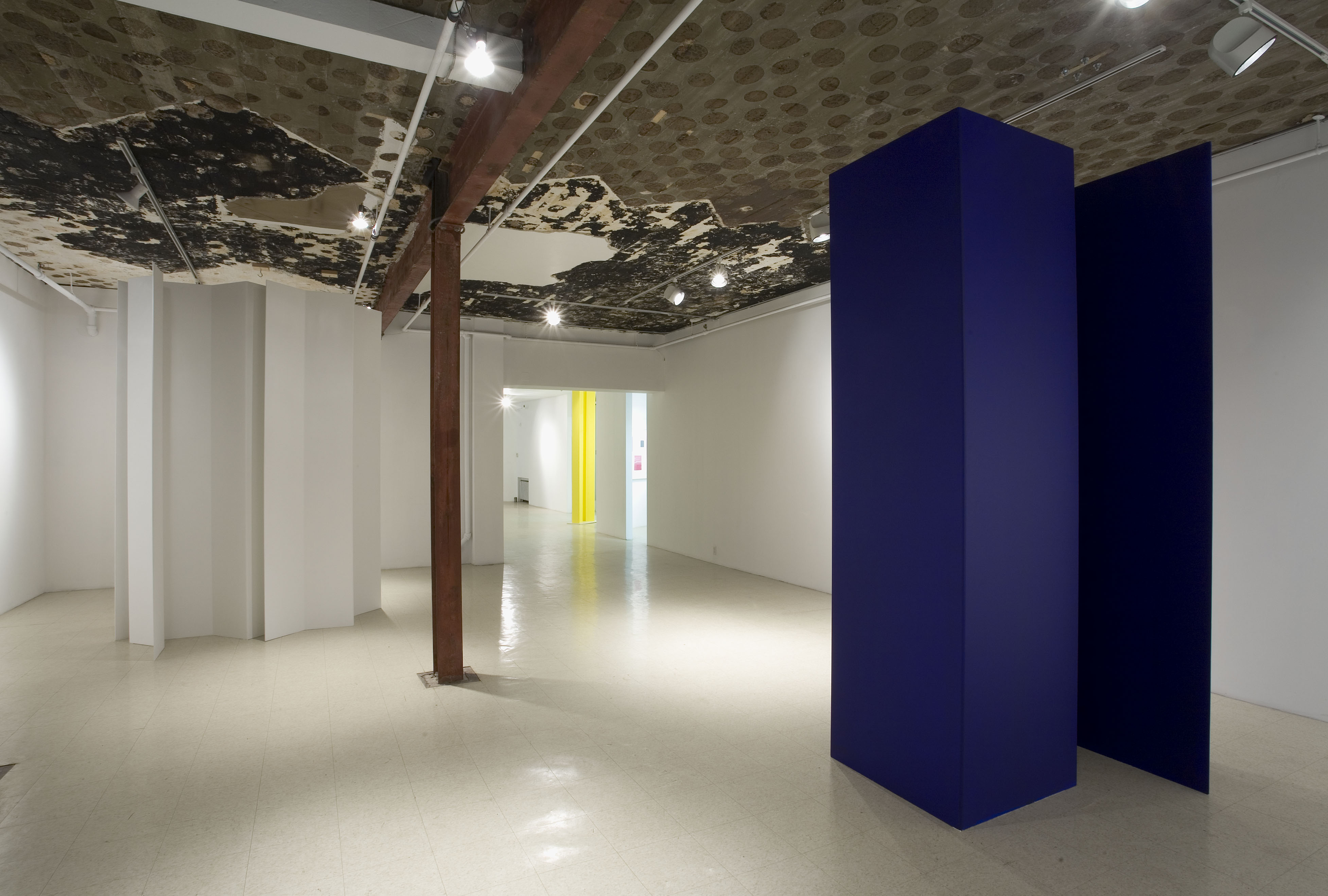
Modulateur de lumière, 2005, installation at Art Mûr

Tousignant is considered a member of the second generation of the modern art movement in Montreal called "les Plasticiens". This group of four painters (Jean-Paul Jérôme, Louis Belzile, Rodolphe de Repentigny (Jauran) and Fernand Toupin) felt painting should be pure form and colour; meaning and spontaneous expression were to be avoided. In 1962, Tousignant introduced the form of the circle, which would become his signature motif, into his geometric paintings.

== Selected exhibitions ==
- solo exhibition, Café L'Échourie, Montreal, 1955;
- solo exhibition, Galerie l'Actuelle, Montreal, 1956;
- The Responsive Eye, Museum of Modern Art, New York 1965;
- Perspective '67, Art Gallery of Ontario, Toronto and Expo 67;
- Seven Montreal Painters, MIT, Cambridge, MA, 1968;
- Canada 101. Edinburgh International Festival, 1968;
- Canada, art d'aujourd'hui, Paris, Rome, Lausanne, Brussels, 1968;
- Canadian Artists 68, Art Gallery of Ontario, 1968;
- Seventh Biennial of Canadian Painting, National Gallery of Canada, 1968;
- Retrospective, National Gallery of Canada, 1973;
- Claude Tousignant: Sculptures, Montreal Museum of Fine Arts, 1982;
- Claude Tousignant: Monochromes, 1978-1993, Musée national des beaux-arts du Québec, Quebec City, 1994;
- retrospectives, Musée d'art contemporain de Montréal, 2009;

== Awards ==
- Governor General's Award in Visual and Media Arts (2010)
- Paul-Émile Borduas Prize (1989)
- Officer of the Order of Canada (1976)
- Victor Martyn Lynch-Staunton Award (1974)
- Prize from the Canadian Institute of Rome (1973)
- First prize (painting), Perspective '67, Toronto (1967)
- First prize (painting), Salon de la Jeune Peinture, Paris (1962)
- Member, Royal Canadian Academy of Arts

== Museum collections ==
- Aldrich Contemporary Art Museum, Ridgefield, Connecticut (USA);
- Artothèque de Montréal;
- Art Gallery of Ontario, Toronto;
- Canada Council Art Bank, Ottawa;
- Musée d'art contemporain de Montréal;
- Musée national des beaux-arts du Québec, Quebec City;
- Montreal Museum of Fine Arts;
- National Gallery of Canada, Ottawa;
- Vancouver Art Gallery, British Columbia;
- York University, Toronto
