= Fernand Leduc =

Canadian artist (1916–2014)

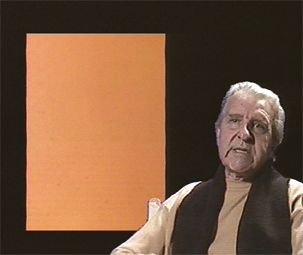
- Leduc in 1995
- Born: July 4, 1916; Viauville, Montreal, Quebec
- Died: January 28, 2014 (aged 97)
- Known for: painter
- Spouse: Thérèse Renaud

Fernand Leduc (4 July 1916 – 28 January 2014) was a Canadian abstract expressionist painter and a major figure in the Quebec contemporary art scene in the 1940s and 1950s. During his 50-year career, Leduc participated in many exhibitions in Canada and France. He was born in Viauville, Montreal, Quebec.

== Biography ==
In 1938 Leduc started his studies at the École des Beaux-Arts de Montréal. After graduating in 1943, he left the church and shortly after became a member of the Contemporary Arts Society. Leduc played a major role in forming the group known as the Les Automatistes, co-signing the Refus Global manifesto, but not contributing to the illustrated book. He moved to Paris with his wife Thérèse Renaud in 1946 and slowly distanced himself from the group. There he participated in an exhibition, called Automatisme, at the Galerie du Luxembourg that examined the group. By late 1948, he had joined the Plasticiens. In Paris, Leduc developed a friendship with the painter Jean Bazaine, who was at the time producing works which could be described as abstracted landscapes. This contact was an influence on Leduc's works of the early 1950s.

He returned from Paris in 1953. With Paul-Émile Borduas, the theoretician of the Automatist group, he was the one who maintained the closest ties with the French surrealists. Leduc moved to a type of hard-edge abstraction in 1955. He helped found The Non-Figurative Artists' Association of Montreal (Association des artistes non-figuratifs de Montréal) in 1956 and was its first President. He experimented at that time with various forms of spontaneous and gestural nonfigurative painting, his works gradually becoming more involved with interactions and contrast of colours.

Leduc returned to France in 1959 and stayed there until 1970, when he came back for two years to teach in Montréal. In 1970, the Centre culturel canadien in Paris in combination with the National Gallery of Canada held a travelling exhibition of 16 paintings done over a three-year period in which he used biomorphic abstraction. In 1977 he received the Victor Martyn Lynch-Staunton Award. In 1979 he was awarded the Louis-Philippe Hébert Prize and the Paul-Émile Borduas Prize in 1988.

Leduc died of cancer in Montreal on January 28, 2014.

== Selected expositions ==
- 1950–1951: Galerie Creuze, Paris
- 1950: Cercle Universitaire, Montréal
- 1955: Musée de Granby; lycée Pierre Corneille, Montréal
- 1956: Galerie l'Actuelle, Montréal
- 1958: Galerie Denyse Delrue, Montréal
- 1959: Galerie Artek, Montréal
- 1961: Délégation du Québec à Paris
- 1962: Galerie Hautefeuille, Paris
- 1963–1965: Galerie 60, Montréal
- 1966: Musée du Québec; Musée d'Art Contemporain, Montréal
- 1970 Centre Culturel Canadien, Paris; Galerie III, Montréal; Exposition rétrospective de Fernand Leduc, Musée d'art contemporain de Montréal; Musée du Québec; Mendel Art Gallery, Saskatoon; Memorial University of Newfoundland, Saint-John; Beaverbrook Art Gallery, Fredericton; Université de Sherbrooke; The Robert McLaughlin Gallery, Oshawa
- 1972: Galerie Jolliet, Québec; Galerie III, Montréal
- 1973: Tapestries Les 7 jours, Centre culturel canadien, Paris; Thielson Gallery, London, Ontario; Exposition itinérante à travers les provinces maritimes, Galerie III, Montréal
- 1974: Tapestries Les 7 jours, Galerie Kostiner-Silvers, Montréal; Journées Canadiennes, Toulouse, France
- 1975: Dizaine canadienne (Ten days over Canada), Lyon, France; Tapestries Les 7 jours, Agnes Etherington Art Centre, Kingston, Ontario et York University, Toronto, Ontario; Michochromies, House of Canada, London, United Kingdom; Microchromies pastels, Galerie Gilles Corbeil, Montréal
- 1980: Musée d'art contemporain de Montréal; Centre Canadien à Paris; Musée Municipal, Brest, France
- 1984: Services Culturels du Québec, Paris
- 1985: Musée des Beaux-Arts de Chartres
- 1986: Musée du Nouveau Monde de La Rochelle
- 1997: Musée du Québec, Québec
- 2001: Galerie Graff, Montréal
- 2011: Galerie Michel-Ange, Montréal

== Sources ==
- Biographie par la Galerie Michel-Ange
- The Canadian Encyclopedia 2000
- Galerie Graff bio, expositions
- The Automatists and the Book

== Suggested reading ==
- Jean-Pierre Duquette, Fernand Leduc.
