= Kosso Eloul =

Israeli sculptor

Kosso Eloul קוֹסוֹ אלאול
- Born: 1920; Murom, Russia
- Known for: Sculptor
- Movement: Israeli art
- Spouse(s): Rita Letendre, married 1964

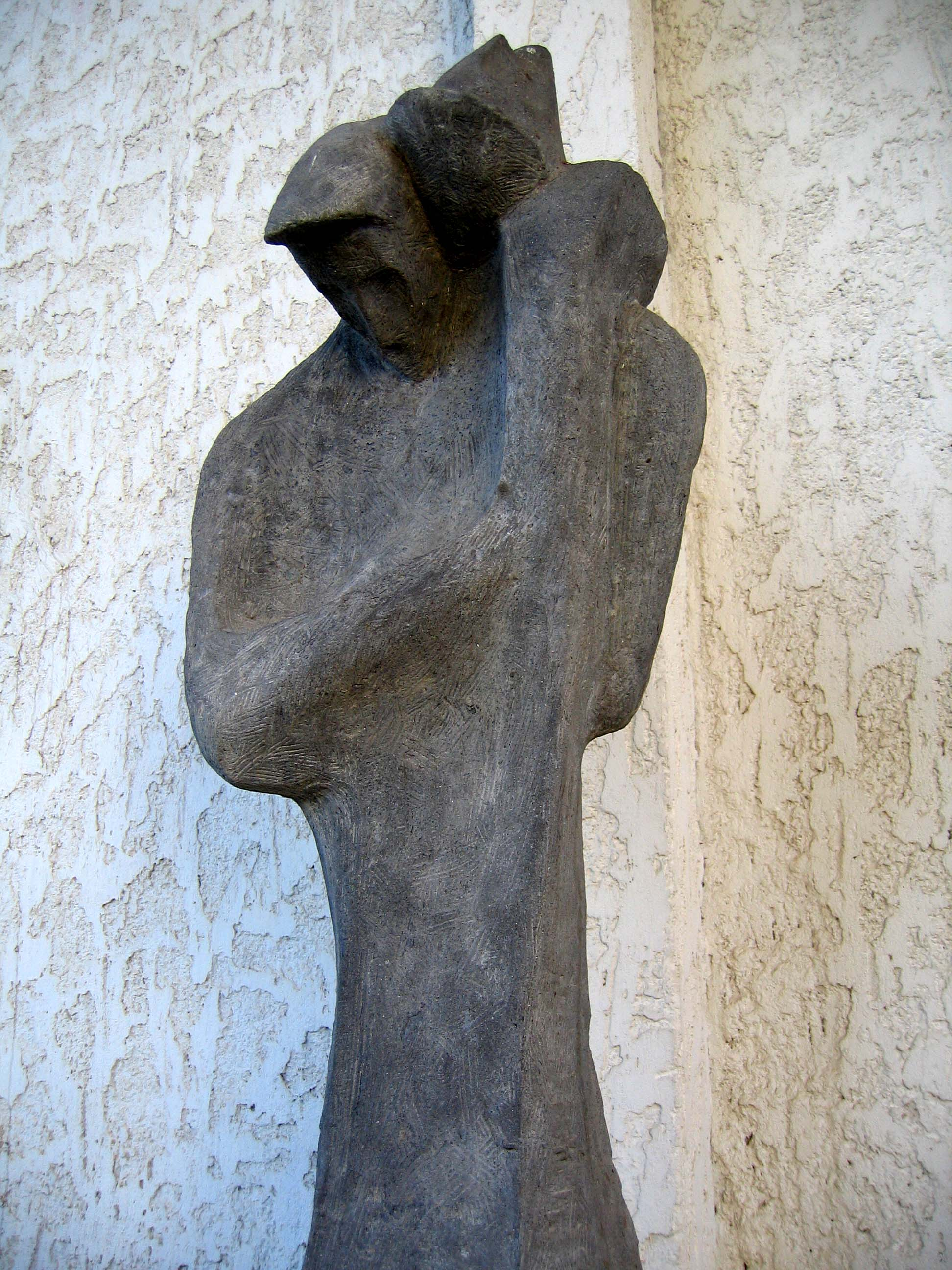
Never Been Separated, a sculpture by Kosso Eloul at the Petach Tikva Museum of Art

Kosso Eloul (Hebrew: קוֹסוֹ אלאול; 1920–1995, born in Russia) was an Israeli sculptor. His work displays a combination between the influence of "Canaanite" art and the abstractionism of the Ofakim Hadashim movement. He won the Dizengoff Prize for Sculpture in 1951.

== Biography ==
Kosso Eloul was born in the city of Murom, Russia. In 1924 (aged 4) he immigrated with his family to Palestine. His artistic education began in the Herzliya Hebrew Gymnasium in Tel Aviv, and continued at the Reali School in Haifa with Yitzhak Sirkin as his teacher. He spent 1938 studying sculpture at Yitzhak Danziger's studio in Tel Aviv. In 1939, at age 19, he went to the United States in order to study at the Art Institute of Chicago, which he did until 1943. He continued his studies in New York and Philadelphia.

During World War II he volunteered for the United States Navy, in which he served for two years. Returning to Palestine in February 1946, he settled in Shfeya. During the 1948 Arab–Israeli War he lived in the kibbutz of Ein Harod and served as a medic in battles taking place near Mount Gilboa. In Ein Harod he worked for five years as an art teacher. Afterwards he moved to Ramat Gan and continued teaching there until 1955. Among his students were Pinhas Ashat, Matanya Abramson, and Raffi Lavie. He joined the New Horizons art group in 1948. In 1951 he won the Dizengoff Prize for Sculpture for his sculpture "Prisoner". Beginning in the 1950s he took an active roles in Symposia in Israel, and from 1960 in international symposia for sculptors, including in Berlin(1963) and Montreal(1964), while displaying his work in European cities such as Rome and Berlin. Towards the end of 1962 he organized an international sculpture symposium which took place in Mitzpe Ramon. This event indicated the growing interest of sculptors in the Israeli landscape, especially desert and barren landscapes.

In 1964 (according to another source – 1969) Eloul immigrated to Toronto, Canada, where he lived until his death in 1995. During his residence there he erected more than 40 sculptures around the city.

Invited as a participant to the first sculpture symposium in the United States in 1965, he contributed the monolith sculpture "Hard Fact".

Eloul died from a heart attack in Toronto in November 1995, at age 75. He left behind two sons and a daughter.

== Education ==
- 1938 Studio of Itzhak Danziger, Tel Aviv, sculpture
- 1939–1943 Art Institute, Chicago, Illinois, USA.

== Teaching ==
- Kibbutz Ein Harod.
- Ramat Gan, Yahalom School

== Awards and prizes ==
- 1951 Dizengoff Prize for Painting and Sculpture, Tel Aviv Museum of Art, Municipality of Tel Aviv-Yafo

== See also ==
Visual arts in Israel
