= Fernande Saint-Martin =

Canadian arts theorist (1927–2019)

Fernande Saint-Martin OC
- Born: March 28, 1927; Montreal, Quebec, Canada
- Died: December 11, 2019 (aged 91); Sainte-Agathe-des-Monts, Quebec, Canada
- Education: Université de Montréal; McGill University
- Occupations: Art critic; museologist; semiologist; visual arts theorist; writer
- Years active: 1954–2010
- Employers: La Presse (1954–1960); Châtelaine (1960–1972)
- Organization: Université du Québec à Montréal
- Spouse: Guido Molinari (m. 1958; died 2004)
- Children: 1
- Awards: Molson Prize (1989)

Fernande Saint-Martin OC (March 28, 1927 – December 11, 2019) was a Canadian art critic, museologist, semiologist, visual arts theorist and writer. A graduate of the Université de Montréal and McGill University, her career began at La Presse in 1954 before being made editor-in-chief of Châtelaine magazine in 1960. Saint-Martin left the magazine in 1972 and was made director of the Musée d'art contemporain de Montréal. She was a professor and researcher at Université Laval and later Université du Québec à Montréal from 1979 to 1996. Saint-Martin wrote several books and essays, contributed to various art publications and was awarded the Molson Prize in Humanities and Social Sciences from the Canada Council for her work in semiology in 1989. She was also president of the International Association for Visual Semiotics from 1990 to 1994.

== Early life and education ==
Saint-Martin was born on March 28, 1927, in Montreal, Quebec, to the health medical officer Théo Saint-Martin and Emelda Montbriand. She was the granddaughter of the socialist and l’Université ouvrière founder Albert Saint-Martin. She earned Bachelor of Arts degrees in medieval studies in 1947, and philosophy in 1948 from the Université de Montréal. Saint-Martin went on to graduate with a Bachelor of Arts degree in French Studies in 1951 and a Master of Arts degree in French literature in 1952 from the McGill University. In 1973, she returned to education, graduating from McGill with a Doctor of Philosophy degree in literature with her dissertation on Samuel Beckett's fictional world.

== Career ==
Following the completion of her education, Saint-Martin began working in student and union journalism. She began working for La Presse in 1954, where she systemically promoted working women in the publication, and talked about the least active women and conducted interviews as she expanded from two to six journalists. From the 1950s to the 1960s, Saint-Martin got involved in feminist activism, promoting contraception and social rights relating to advancing female equality in society, and defending women intellectuals. She and the painter Guido Molinari formed the L’Actuelle art gallery in 1953 and ran it until its closure two years later. In 1958, Saint-Martin published the essay La littérature et le non-verbal: essai sur la langue, and helped to establish the debate and ideas publication Situations that same year.

Two years later in October 1960, Saint-Martin was appointed editor-in-chief of Châtelaine magazine, the first woman to hold the position at the publication. At the publication, she published art-related pieces and poetry, some deemed unconventional for women's magazines in that era. In 1966, Saint-Martin was one of sixteen signatories to the nondenominational feminist organization Fédération des femmes du Québec. She subsequently authored the essays La femme et la société cléricale and La femme et la société cléricale in 1967 and 1968, respectively. Saint-Martin left Châtelaine in 1972 and was appointed director of the Musée d'art contemporain de Montréal late that year. She was given a mandate to restructure the museum so its influence could be extended and be opened to all forms of contemporary art. Saint-Martin oversaw more than double the number of visitations to the museum and increased her budget to five times its original amount.

Saint-Martin became a member of the Académie des lettres du Québec in 1974. Two years later, she wrote Samuel Beckett et l’univers de la fiction about Beckett's prose fiction. In 1977, Saint-Martin stepped down as director of the Musée d'art contemporain de Montréal and began working as a professor and researcher in the Department of Art and History of the Université du Québec à Montréal (UQAM) in 1979 following a brief period at Université Laval. In 1980, she published the essay Les fondements topologiques de la peinture. Essai sur les modes de représentation de l’espace à l’origine de l’art enfantin et de l’art abstrait and became a fellow of the Royal Society of Canada in 1982. Saint-Martin authored the book, La fiction du réel : poèmes 1953–1975, in 1985. Two years later, she published the book Sémiologie du langage visuel.

On November 17, 1988, Saint-Martin was appointed Officer of the Order of Canada by the Governor General of Canada, and earned the André Laurendeau Award from the Association francophone pour le savoir that same year. She won the Molson Prize in Humanities and Social Sciences and with it a $50,000 cheque from the Canada Council for her work in semiology in 1989. Between 1990 and 1994, Saint-Martin was the International Association for Visual Semiotics' president. During this period, she published La théorie de la Gestalt et l’art visuel. Essai sur les fondements de la sémiotique visuelle in 1990. In September 1996, Saint-Martin retired from the UQAM to focus primarily on writing.

She wrote Marouflée la langue, dessins et poèmes, Le sens du langage visuel. Essai de sémantique visuelle psychanalytique and L’immersion dans l’art. Comment donner sens aux œuvres de 7 artistes : le Maître de Flémalla, O. Leduc, Magritte, Mondrian, Lichtenstein, Rothko, Molinari over the following twelve years. Saint-Martin was also a contributor to various magazines such as Art International, artscanada, Les Herbes rouges, Liberté, RACAR and Vie des arts. One of her final public acts was to sign a public letter to Philippe Couillard, the Premier of Quebec in May 2018, requesting his assistance to relieve the Académie des lettres du Québec of its financial difficulties.

== Personal life ==
She married the painter Guido Molinari in 1958. They had two children, a daughter and son. Saint-Martin died from various health problems relating to old age at L'hôpital de Ste-Agathe, Sainte-Agathe-des-Monts, on December 11, 2019. A tribute to her was organised by the L’Académie des lettres du Québec and the Fondation Guido Molinari on February 15, 2020.

== Analysis ==
Christine Palmiéri described Saint-Martin as "fascinating as a teacher" and "was not just giving material, she was thinking at the same time." Lev Manovich of The American Journal of Semiotics wrote that the author "follows the model of formal grammar, where language is described as a set of elements combined according to syntactic rules to form statements."
