= Howard Taylor (painter) =

Australian artist (1918–2001)

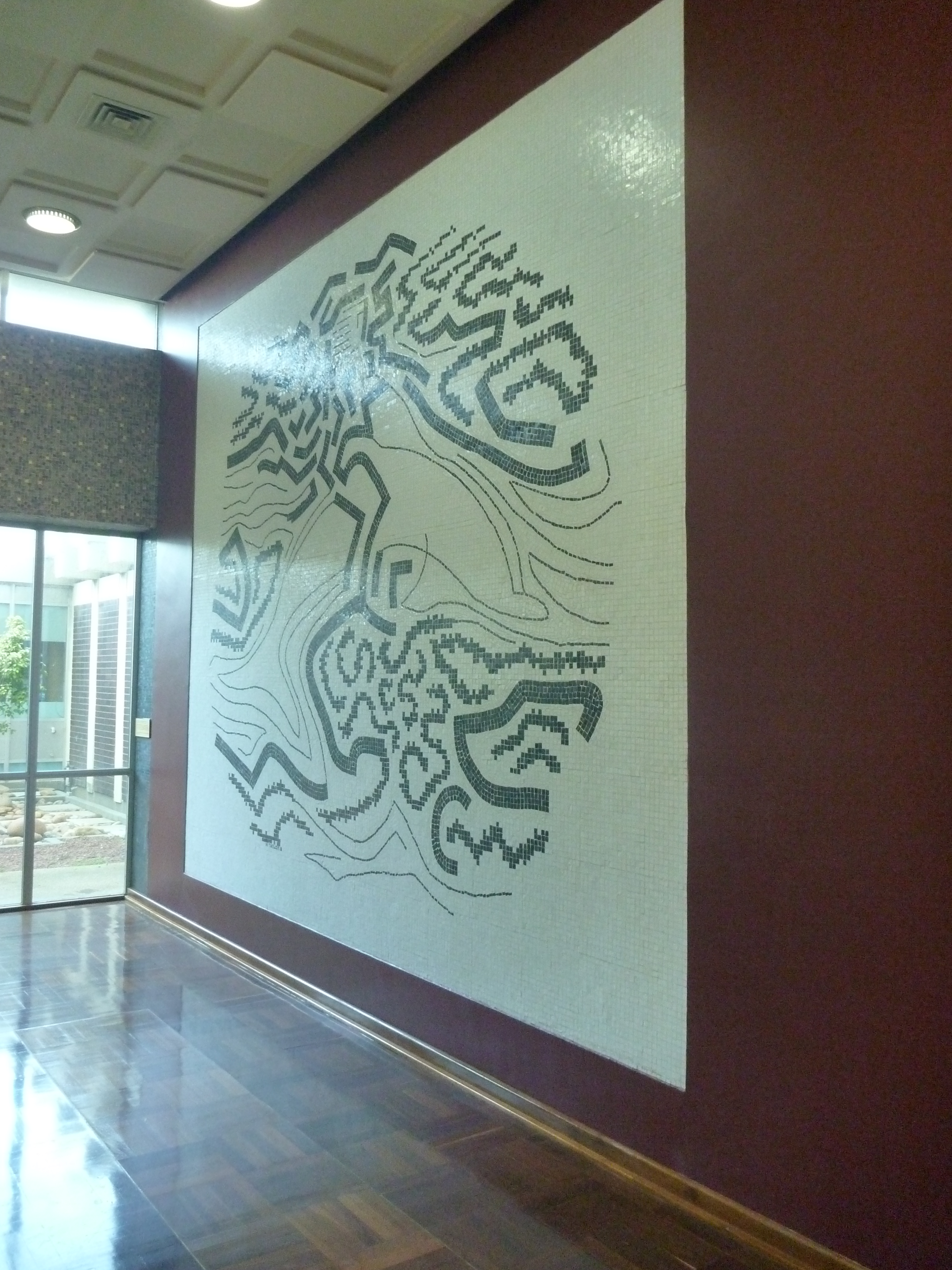
In 1964 Taylor was commissioned to produce two mosaic murals for the Fremantle Port Authority's administration building.

Howard Taylor AM D.Litt (29 August 1918 – 19 July 2001) was a painter, potter, graphic artist and teacher of art in Perth, Western Australia.

== History ==
Howard was born in Hamilton, Victoria the son of Rev. Charles Edmund Taylor (ca.1888 – 30 July 1950) and Eleanor Minnie Taylor. They lived in South Australia until 1932, when they moved to Perth, Western Australia, where the Rev. Taylor served as secretary of the British and Foreign Bible Society. Howard enrolled at Perth Modern School, where he excelled in athletics. In 1937 he enrolled with the Royal Australian Air Force and trained as a pilot, winning the Mannock Cup for his term at Point Cook pilot training school. He flew with the Royal Air Force and was forced down at Hirson, France, and captured on 19 May 1940. He spent most of the War in internment camps and was released in 1945 and returned to Perth.

In 1946 he returned to England, where he married Sheila Smith and enrolled as a part-time student at the Birmingham College of Art, studying under Bernard Fleetwood-Walker. In 1949 he returned with his small family to Perth, and there set up a studio. In September the same year he had a one-man exhibition at Newspaper House, Perth which was favourably reviewed. A tempera painting "Stumps and Ash" entered for a competition run by the Perth Art Gallery in 1951 was highly praised. That same year he commenced teaching part-time at the Perth Technical College, where he continued until 1965, when he secured a part-time position with the School of Architecture and Planning, Western Australian Institute of Technology, where he remained for four years, teaching painting, drawing and sculpture. In 1977 he was promoted to Artist-in-Residence at the Western Australian Institute of Technology.

In 1988 he received a commission for a sculpture "Compass and perspective", Parliament House, Canberra.

== Recognition ==
- In 1986 he received an Australia Council Emeritus Award.
- In 1989 he was appointed a Member of the Order of Australia.
- In 1991 he was appointed a Fellow of Curtin University of Technology, Perth.
- In 1993 he received the honorary degree of Doctor of Letters from the University of Western Australia, Perth.
- In 2000 he received both a Lifetime Achievement Award and a Citizen of the Year Award from the Western Australian Government.
- In 2001 he received an honorary degree of Doctor of Technology from Curtin University.

== Family ==
Howard married Sheila Smith in 1946 and a daughter Penelope was born in 1947. Their first home in Perth was at Bickley. In 1967 they moved to Northcliffe.
