= Wanda Nanibush =

Anishinaabe curator, artist and educator

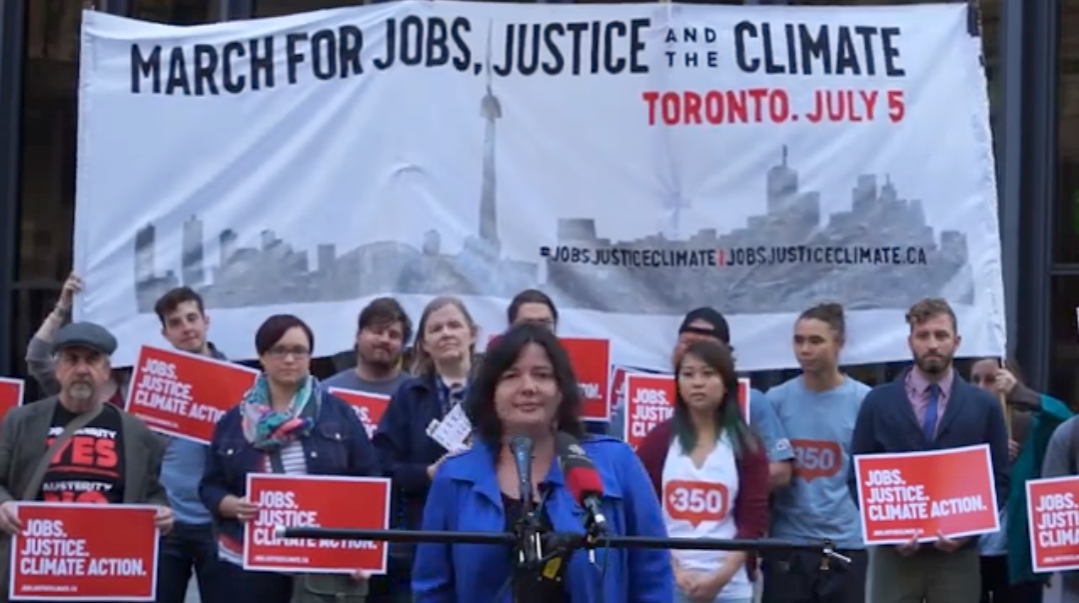
- Speaking at the March for Jobs, Justice, and the Climate in 2015
- Born: 1976 (age 49–50)
- Citizenship: Beausoleil First Nation and Canadian
- Education: University of Toronto
- Known for: Indigenous curation
- Website: ago.ca/people/wanda-nanibush

Wanda Nanibush (born 1976) is an Anishinaabe curator, artist and educator based in Toronto, Ontario. From 2016 to 2023, she held the position of the inaugural curator of Indigenous Art at the Art Gallery of Ontario.

Nanibush won the 2023 Toronto Book Award for the book Moving the Museum, written in collaboration with her fellow Art Gallery of Ontario curator Georgiana Uhlyarik and was a jurist for the 2023 Sobey Art Award.

== Career ==
Nanibush is a member of the Beausoleil First Nation. She obtained an MA in visual studies from the University of Toronto. She has also served as Curator in Residence at the Justina M. Barnicke Gallery.

Nanibush has a long-standing relationship with Anishinaabe multimedia artist Rebecca Belmore and has curated a series of shows featuring her work including KWE: Photography, Sculpture, Video and Performance by Rebecca Belmore (2014) at the Justina M. Barnicke Gallery, and Rebecca Belmore: Facing the Monumental (2018) a survey of Belmore's 30 year career at the Art Gallery of Ontario.

Nanibush has been an active community organizer participating in demonstrations against the Iraq War and uranium processing, and raising awareness about the relationship between racism and lack of education. She has also worked as an organizer for Idle No More Toronto talks and teach-ins to help with education efforts.

In 2025, she will serve as the Helen Frankenthaler Visiting Professor in Curating in the Ph.D programme in art history at the City University of New York.

=== Art Gallery of Ontario ===
Nanibush began work at the Art Gallery of Ontario in 2016 as an assistant curator of Canadian and Indigenous Art in the department of Canadian art. Her first curatorial project at the AGO was Toronto: Tributes + Tributaries, 1971–1989, for which she included Anishinaabemowin land acknowledgment text alongside English and French as a way of marking Toronto as traditional Indigenous territory. The exhibition was a collections exhibition that turned over after four months including over 120 artists. It had a film festival and performance art series as part of the programming.

In 2017, Nanibush and Georgiana Uhlyarik renamed the department of Canadian Art, the department of Indigenous and Canadian Art, and developed a new nation to nation model of sharing power. As part of the role, Nanibush created a new Indigenous Curator position and co heads the department with Georgiana Uhlyarik, the curator of Canadian Art. Together they have made a series of changes to the exhibition of Indigenous and Canadian art, including renaming the 1929 Emily Carr painting from The Indian Church to Church in Yuquot Village, 73 years after Carr's death, and centering Indigenous art in the renamed McLean Centre for Indigenous and Canadian Art. The centre has texts in Anishinabemowin, Inuktitute and other First Nations languages alongside English and French.

Since becoming the curator of Indigenous Art, Nanibush's influence has led to Indigenous artists representing nearly one third of those featured at the AGO. In a 2018 profile about the changes underway at the Gallery and other institutions featuring Indigenous art, the New York Times noted Nanibush as "one of the most powerful voices for Indigenous culture in the North American art world."

=== Departure from Art Gallery of Ontario ===
Nanibush parted ways with the AGO in late November 2023. Her departure was cast as a "mutual decision" by the Art Gallery of Ontario; however, her exit came after the Israel Museum and Arts, Canada (IMAAC) sent a complaint to the AGO in mid-October 2023. Nanibush has been publicly vocal in her "support of the Palestinian cause, linking the experiences of Indigenous peoples living in Canada to those of Palestinians", a stance which drew intense criticism from various pro-Israel interest groups, including internal stakeholders at the AGO and the IMAAC. IMAAC's letter alleges that Nanibush's vocal criticism of Israel's illegal occupation of Palestinian territory is "inflammatory" and "inaccurate" while UN expert has equated Israel policies to settler colonialism.

Nanibush's departure has raised criticism of culture of censorship in the Canadian art world. Notable figures in the Canadian and international arts sector have expressed their support and solidarity with Nanibush including Lucy Bell, Haida curator and professor who led the Indigenous collection and repatriation department at the Royal British Columbia Museum before resigning due to systemic racism and bullying, artist Dr. Jamelie Hassan, winner of the 2001 Governor General's Award in Visual Arts, and Candice Hopkins, Tlingit curator, artist and Executive Director of the Native-led Forge Project in Taghkanic, New York. On November 28, 2023, an open letter signed by over 50 Canadian and international Indigenous cultural leaders, including Shelley Niro, Greg A. Hill, Raymond Boisjoly, Andrea Carlson and Gabrielle L'Hirondelle Hill, condemned the AGO's "decision to erase Nanibush’s institutional presence" and censured the AGO and other Canadian art institutions' for the "harms inflicted upon our community members working in these institutions" through "regular systemic discrimination, racism and subsequent stress-related obstacles". The letter called for the AGO to "review and revise the inner workings and cultures of their institutions and to genuinely support and commit to practiced policies of decolonization and Indigenization". The same day, 44 recipients of the Governor General's Awards in Visual and Media Arts published a shared statement to "express our alarm and disapproval of the forced departure of Wanda Nanibush" and that "the forced departure of Wanda Nanibush is an act of political censorship" that "severely damages the reputation and credibility of the AGO and sets a dangerous precedent in Canadian art that demands protest". An open letter, signed by over 3500 artists, curators and cultural workers, including artist and professor Deanna Bowen and the curator and professor Gabrielle Moser, called for a boycott of the AGO in response to Nanibush's departure.

On November 30, 2023, the AGO's Director Stephan Jost released a public statement in response to the backlash and public calls for accountability, stating he is "taking this seriously and I know there will need to be a rebuilding of trust. I recognize there is much work to be done with open, honest, and brave conversations" and the institution will "deeply review and reflect on our commitments to the Truth and Reconciliation Commission Report". An anonymously-led group, AGO, NO, continues to document the ongoing controversy.

As of January 2024, Nanibush has not publicly commented on her departure, citing the terms of her leave.

== Other activities ==
In 2024, Nanibush was part of the jury that selected Rosana Paulino as recipient of the inaugural Munch Award.

== Curated exhibitions ==
- Robert Houle, Red is Beautiful, organized by AGO (2022), toured to Calgary Contemporary, Winnipeg Art Gallery, on view at Smithsonian Museum of American Indian Art until May 2024.
- Rosalie Favell, Portraits of Desire, AGO (June 23, 2023 - April 21, 2024)
- Radical Remembrance: The Sculptures of David Ruben Piqtoukun, AGO, January 21 - June 25, 2023
- Shuvinai Ashoona Beyond the Visible, AGO, 2021
- Rebecca Belmore, Turbulent Water co-curated with Angela Goddard, Griffith University Art Gallery 2021 (Brisbane, Australia), toured to Buxton Contemporary (Melbourne Australia). Rebecca Belmore's first Australian solo exhibition.
- Bill Nasogaluak, AGO, December 18, 2021 - ongoing
- Karoo Ashevak, AGO, 2019-2021
- Michael Belmore, AGO, September 26, 2020 - November 21, 2021
- Sandra Brewster, BLUR, (AGO) April, 2020 -September 13, 2020 plus wall transfer installation Untitled (Blur), McLean Centre, AGO, 2020-2023.
- Peter Pitseolak, AGO, 2018-2020
- Rebecca Belmore: Facing the Monumental, organized and circulated by the Art Gallery of Ontario (2018), toured to the Remai Modern (2019) and the Musée d'art contemporain de Montréal (2019)
- June Clark, AGO, June 30, 2018 - Dec 9, 2018
- Nanabozho's Sisters, Dalhousie Art Gallery, October 12 - November, 2018 toured to Doris McCarthy Gallery, Feb 9 - March 30, 2019
- McLean Centre for Indigenous and Canadian Art, AGO, 2018-2023
- Sovereign Acts II, Leonard & Bina Ellen Art Gallery at Concordia University (2017), toured to the University of Waterloo Art Gallery (2018), Art Gallery of Windsor (2018/2019), Galerie d'art Louise-et-Reuben-Cohen (2019), Kelowna Art Gallery (2019/2020)
- Rita Letendre, Fire & Light, co-curated with Georgiana Uhlyarik, AGO,
- Tanya Lukin Linklater, Sun Force, performance, AGO, August 9–18, 2017
- The Fifth World, Mendel Art Gallery (2015) and toured to the Kitchener-Waterloo Art Gallery (2016)
- KWE: Photography, Sculpture, Video and Performance by Rebecca Belmore, Justina M. Barnicke Gallery (2014)
- House of Wayward Spirits, Across Toronto, 2012, Rebecca Belmore and Adrian Stimson perform in Queens Park, James Luna performs at The Sister, Lori Blondeau, Archer Pechawis, Ulysses Castellanos, Terrance Houle, Cathy Gordon perform at Toronto Free Gallery.
- Sovereign Acts, Justina M Barnicke gallery, April 18 - May 27, 2012, Open Space Gallery, May 1 - June 15, 2014, Neutral Ground, Feb 22 - April 4, 2014, Southern Alberta Art Gallery, May 1 - June 15, 2014
- Mapping Resistances, Odemin Giizis festival, Peterborough, performances by Tanya Lukin Linklater, James Luna, Rebecca Belmore, Archer Pechawis, work by Robert Houle, storytelling by Doug Williams, Leanne Simpson
- Rez-Erection: Belle Sauvage, Buffalo Boy, Miss Chief set up Camp, Ode'min Giizis Festival, 2009, (Lori Blondeau, Adrian Simpson, Kent Monkman)
- Chronotopic Village, Modern Fuel Artist-Run Centre, 2009, Kevin Lee Burton, Thirza Cuthand, Cheryl L'hirondelle, Nadia Myre, Darlene Naponse

== Publications ==
- Wanda Nanibush Reading List https://www.obodmag.com/issue-4/wanda-nanibush-reading-list
- Robert Houle, Red is Beautiful catalogue
- Moving the Museum, 2023
- Rebecca Belmore Facing the Monumental Catalogue

== Awards and honours ==
- 2023: Toronto Book Award for Moving the Museum
- 2024: Hnatyshyn Foundation Mid-Career Award for curatorial excellence.
