= Georgiana Uhlyarik =

Romanian-Canadian art curator, art historian, and educator (born 1972)

- Born: Georgiana Uhlyarik-Nicolae; 1972 (age 53–54); Bucharest, Romania
- Known for: Canadian art curator, art historian, and teacher

Georgiana Uhlyarik-Nicolae, also known as Georgiana Uhlyarik (born 1972) is a Romanian-born Canadian art curator, art historian, and teacher. She is currently the Fredrik S. Eaton Curator of Canadian Art at the Art Gallery of Ontario (AGO). She has been part of the team or led teams that created numerous exhibitions, on subjects such as Betty Goodwin, Michael Snow, and Kathleen Munn among others and collaborated with art organizations such as the Tate Modern, and the Jewish Museum, New York.

Uhlyarik won the 2023 Toronto Book Award for her book Moving the Museum, co-authored with Wanda Nanibush.

== Biography ==
Uhlyarik was born in Bucharest, Romania as the only child of Mariana Nicolae, an architect and Nicolae Uhlyarik, a chemical engineer.

Uhlyarik is the Fredrik S. Eaton Curator of Canadian Art at the Art Gallery of Ontario (AGO) since 2002. In 2014, the AGO hosted another Uhlyarik project, Introducing Suzy Lake. The 2015 exhibition Picturing the Americas that opened at the AGO and then toured the United States and Brasil, which Uhlyarik co-curated with P.J. Brownlee, curator of the Terra Foundation for American Art and Valeria Piccoli chief curator at the Pinacoteca do Estado de São Paulo, Brazil won the 2016 Award of Excellence of the Association of Art Museum Curators (AAMC). Uhlyarik authored the essay on "Letendre in Toronto" in the catalogue of the AGO retrospective of Rita Letendre in 2017 and in the same year worked on the 2017 Georgia O'Keeffe retrospective which was both an artistic achievement and a commercial success. In 2018 she co-curated TUNIRRUSIANGIT, an AGO exhibition of works by Kenojuak Ashevak and Tim Pitsiulak. She also co-curated and contributed to the catalogue of Magnetic North: Imagining Canada in Painting 1910-1940 (2021), co-organized by the Schirn Kunsthalle Frankfurt, the Art Gallery of Ontario, and the National Gallery of Canada.

Uhlyarik teaches courses on Canadian art at the University of Toronto, where she is an associate professor, is an outspoken advocate for the promotion of women artists and curators as well as publicizing of Canadian indigenous art.

Uhlyarik is the author of Kathleen Munn: Life & Work (2014), published by the Art Canada Institute. She wrote an article on Munn in Uninvited: Canadian Women Artists in the Modern Movement. In 2025, "Joyce Wieland: Heart On" edited by Anne Grace and Georgiana Uhlyarik was published by Goose Lane Editions with the Art Gallery of Ontario and Montreal Museum of Fine Arts.

== Awards and honours ==
- 2016: 2016 Award of Excellence, Association of Art Museum Curators for Picturing the Americas
- 2023: Toronto book Award with Wanda Nanibush for Moving the Museum
