= Rodolphe de Repentigny (Jauran) =

Canadian artist (1926–1959)

- Born: 11 February 1926; Ville Saint-Laurent, Montreal, Quebec
- Died: 24 July 1959 (aged 33); Banff, Alberta
- Other name: "Jauran"
- Education: mathematics and psychology at the University of Montreal (1947–1949); literature and philosophy at Sorbonne University, Paris (1950–1951)
- Known for: Painter, art critic, theorist, photographer, and mountaineer
- Spouse: Françoise Stébenne

Rodolphe de Repentigny (11 February 1926 – 24 July 1959) was a painter, art and literary critic for the newspaper La Presse in Montreal (1952–1959), theorist, photographer and mountaineer. He was a key member of Les Plasticiens and was the writer of the Manifeste des plasticiens. He painted using the pseudonym Jauran.

== Career ==
Rodolphe de Repentigny was born in Ville Saint-Laurent, a borough of the city of Montreal, Quebec. He studied at the Collège St. Laurent and became interested in painting but was persuaded by his family to go to the University of Montreal where he studied mathematics and psychology (1947–1949).

He then travelled to Paris to study literature and philosophy at Sorbonne University (1950–1951) and while there became interested in non-figurative art when he saw the work of Mondrian among others. When he returned from Paris, he got a job as a journalist, writing art and literary criticism for the newspaper La Presse (1952–1959). He also wrote for other journals in Quebec. Besides writing, he returned to painting.

In 1954, he reviewed an exhibition of four young artists whom he called ‘Les Plasticiens’, a group composed of Louis Belzile, Jean-Paul Jérôme, Fernand Toupin and 'Jauran' (himself). By contrast to the Automatism of Borduas and his followers, the Plasticiens rigorously pursued hard-edge geometric abstraction. In 1955, de Repentigny (under the pseudonym Jauran) wrote the Manifeste des plasticiens. It was signed by all the members of the group. In the manifesto, they acknowledged their debt to the Automatists, recognizing their place in the revolutions that had helped to free the arts from "servitude to a materialistic ritual". In 1956, de Repentigny stopped painting to explore photography. He also created abstract works on glossy photo paper.

He helped found The Non-Figurative Artists' Association of Montreal and was elected secretary of the forty-member group in 1956. In 1957, he was elected President of the Association of International Critics Canada.

In 1959, during a mountaineering trip with friends to Lake Louise in the Rockies, he fell into a crevasse while crossing the Victoria Glacier and died. He was 33 years old. He left behind a large body of work on art criticism and aesthetics, some of which has been subsequently published.

== Selected exhibitions ==
- 1954: "Les Plasticiens", Tranquille bookstore, Montreal;
- 1955: "Les Plasticiens", Galerie de l'Échourie;
- 1959: Jauran's photos were exhibited following his death at the École des beaux-arts de Montréal;
- 1977: '"Jauran et les Premiers Plasticiens, 1954–1956", Musée d'art contemporain de Montréal;
- 1992: "The Crisis of Abstraction in Canada: The 1950s", National Gallery of Canada, Ottawa;
- 2005: "Les Plasticiens": Louis Belile, Jauran, Jean-Paul Jérôme, Fernand Toupin", Sherbrooke Museum of Fine Arts, Quebec;
- 2013: "Les Plasticiens and the years 1950–1960", Musée national des beaux-arts du Québec and the Varley Art Gallery of Markham, 2013;

== Selected public collections ==
- Montreal Museum of Fine Arts;
- Musée national des beaux-arts du Québec;
- Musée d'art contemporain de Montréal;
