= Viauville =

- Neighbourhood
- Location of Viauville in Montreal
- Coordinates: 45.5602°N 73.5384°W
- Country: Canada
- Province: Quebec
- City: Montreal
- Borough: Mercier–Hochelaga-Maisonneuve
- Postal Code: H1V
- Area codes: 514, 438

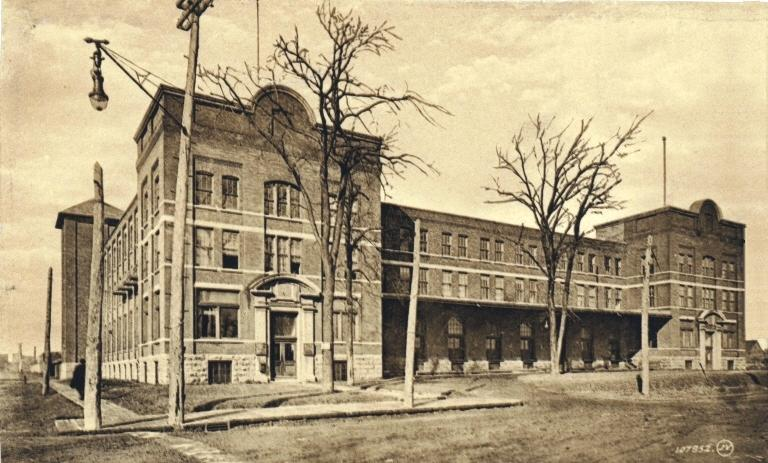
The Viauville cookie factory in 1910.

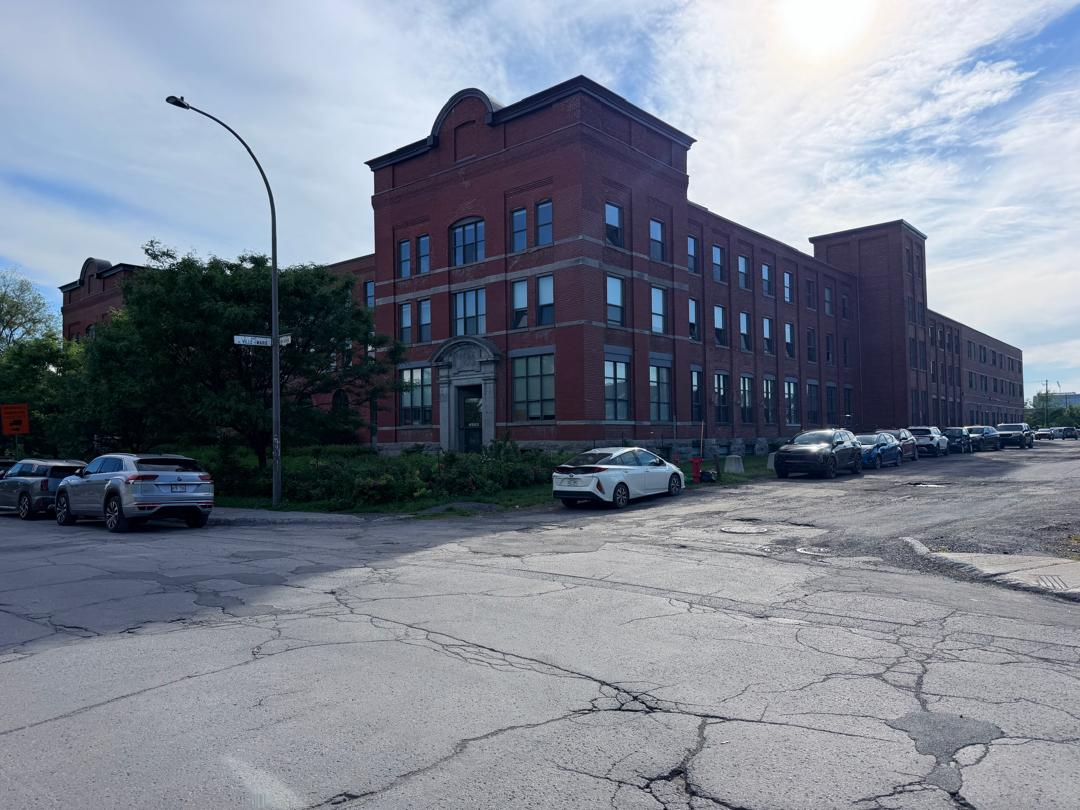
Viauville Biscuit Factory Montreal 2026

Viauville (French pronunciation: [vjovil]) is a neighbourhood in the borough of Mercier–Hochelaga-Maisonneuve located in Montreal, Quebec, Canada. Established in 1892 as a result of an urban plan made by Charles-Théodore Viau and the former city of Maisonneuve, and part of the aforementioned city, Viauville never obtained municipality status.

Viauville is named for Charles-Théodore Viau, a member of the paroisse Saint-Clément and founder of the biscuiterie Viau.

The area was home to Canadian Vickers Maisonville Shipyards, now Port of Montreal berths.

== Important dates ==
- 1867 - Foundation of the biscuiterie Viau
- 1898 - Opening of the registers of the paroisse Saint-Clément.
- 1899 - Inauguration of Saint-Clément Church.
- Culinar acquires biscuiterie Viau.
- Culinar sells biscuiterie Viau to Saputo Incorporated.
- 2001 - Saputo sells biscuiterie Viau to Dare Foods
- 2003 - Closure of the biscuiterie Viau.
