= Pierre Henry (painter) =

Canadian painter

Pierre Henry RCA
- Born: 1932; Bonaventure, Gaspésie, Quebec, Canada
- Died: 2013 (aged 80–81)
- Known for: Painting
- Movement: Anecdotism

Pierre Henry, RCA (1932–2013) was a French Canadian artist and painter born in Gaspésie, Quebec, who became the first president of the Centre les impatients in 1992.

== Life and career ==
Henry studied art in Montreal at the École des beaux-arts, ultimately spending most of his life in the Montreal subregion.

Henry is known for his landscape oil paintings and abstract works, and has exhibited in galleries throughout Canada and North America. His work has been characterized as displaying "a serious lack of seriousness", which is also a feature of the artistic movement, "anecdotism", which Henry founded. Henry’s art features in several prestigious institutional collections, such as at the Royal Bank of Canada, IBM Canada and DuPont.

Henry’s artistic career includes the rehabilitation of a historic house in Saint-Lambert, Quebec, transforming it into the Musée Marsil, and creating "Les femmeuses", an annual exhibition that showcased the work of female artists.

In addition to his artistic endeavours, Henry worked as vice president of communications with Pratt & Whitney, and with Concordia University as president of the consulting committee for the Faculty of Fine Arts.

In 1992, Henry became the president of the Centres les impatients, an organization that uses art therapy to help those suffering from various mental health conditions.

== Honours ==
In 1995, Henry became a member of the Royal Canadian Academy of Arts.
