= Les Plasticiens =

Canadian painting movement

The Plasticien movement was a Canadian non-figurative painting movement, which appeared around 1955 in Quebec. It was a more orderly style of painting in reaction to Les Automatistes

In 1954, a young critic and painter newly returned from Paris, Rodolphe de Repentigny, reviewed an exhibition of four young artists whom he called 'Les Plasticiens'. The name itself expressed their exclusive concern with the abstract properties of painting. They focused on colors, lines, contrast; completely rejecting the idea of Surrealism and their attachment to the idealism of the European Constructivist movement. He pointed out the difference of their approach from automatism. In his criticism he wrote:

Every painting must have its own particular form to make a totality, resistant to and not assimilated by an ambiance and where each part depends on the whole and vice-versa.

The movement was launched in 1955 by the Manifeste des plasticiens, written by de Repentigny (under the name Jauran) and signed by Louis Belzile, Jean-Paul Jérôme and Fernand Toupin. In the manifesto they acknowledged a kind of debt to the Automatists, recognizing their place in the revolutions that had helped to free the arts from “servitude to a materialistic ritual”.

They also called on artists to follow the example of Piet Mondrian. The Plasticiens sought to objectify paintings instead of paint objects. For example, Toupin shaped his own canvases into geometric shapes so that they would be objects of another kind.

Guido Molinari created Plasticien works between 1959 and 1962. Other artists associated with the movement are Claude Tousignant, Denis Juneau, Fernand Leduc and more distantly, George E. Russell.
