= The Non-Figurative Artists' Association of Montreal =

Canadian art collectives, 1956-1961)

- Formation: 1956; 70 years ago
- Type: Arts association
- Legal status: Charity
- Purpose: Exhibitions and networking
- Headquarters: Montreal, PQ, Canada
- Region served: Montreal, Canada
- Official language: French, English

The Non-Figurative Artists' Association of Montreal (NFAAM)/ L'Association des artistes non figuratifs de Montréal was a Canadian art group in Quebec that existed from 1956 to 1961. It had a diverse membership formed from both Les Automatistes and Les Plasticiens as well as semi-abstractionists and over time, numbered almost 50 of the abstract artists in Montreal, extending over many media. Its purpose as a society was to exhibit Montreal non-figurative painters, sculptors, and printmakers in Society shows or elsewhere and to focus the attention of the conservative public and staff of museums on abstract art.

Meetings at Guido Molinari's Galerie L'Actuelle provided the impetus for the organization by its 20 founding members. The three members of the provisional council were Fernand Leduc, Jauran (Rodolphe de Repentigny) and Pierre Gauvreau. Leduc was elected president for the first three and a half years and de Repentigny, secretary. Léon Bellefleur was appointed as advisor. Among the founding members was Paterson Ewen and online is a photo of 18 of the 20 founding members holding up their work in 1957 in Paterson Ewen: Life & Work.

The inaugural show at the Hélène-de-Champlain Restaurant was unjuried like all the following shows and consisted of 51 works, mostly paintings, by 29 artists. It was the first time the abstract artists of Montreal were shown as a recognized and identifiable group. Critical response was positive.

The last show of the NFAAM was a circulating exhibition organized by the National Gallery of Canada in 1960 which was wide-ranging and included Micheline Beauchemin among others such as Marcel Barbeau. Afterward, the Non-Figurative Artists Association of Montreal ceased to exist, largely due to the increase in opportunity to exhibit in commercial galleries. However, it had a critical function for a time in Quebec's cultural evolution and assured the place of abstraction in Montreal.
