= Guido Molinari =

Canadian artist (1933–2004)

Guido Molinari OC RCA
- Born: 12 October 1933; Montreal, Quebec, Canada
- Died: 21 February 2004 (aged 70); Montreal, Quebec, Canada
- Education: École des beaux-arts de Montréal (1948–1950); the Montreal Museum of Fine Arts (1951), studying with Marian Scott and Gordon Webber
- Spouse: Fernande Saint-Martin (m. 1958)

Guido Molinari OC RCA L.L. D. (12 October 1933 – 21 February 2004) was a Canadian artist, known nationally and internationally for his serial abstract paintings and their dynamic interplay of colours and focus on modular shapes. His Stripe series is especially celebrated. Molinari himself described their effect - and the effect of all his paintings - as creating a new kind of fictional space "because it happens in the mind and yet also involves the totality of perception".

== Biography ==
Molinari was born in Montreal, Quebec into a family originally from the Abruzzo region in Italy. He was the son of Charles Molinari (1879–1948), a musician with the Orchestre des concerts symphoniques de Montréal and first president of the Quebec Musicians' Association; and of Evelyne Dini (1889–1966), the daughter of a sculptor, so his childhood was culturally rich. He began painting at age 13 and later enrolled at the School of the Art Association of Montreal, studying with Marian Dale Scott and Gordon Webber (1948–1951). A year later, he contracted tuberculosis. While he was convalescing, he studied existentialism, reading authors such as Sartre, Camus, Piaget and Nietzsche. He did not complete his formal training in art but found his own path.

Early in his career, Molinari read a 1955 article about Jackson Pollock dripping paint onto canvas and went to New York to paint abstractly. He then returned to Montreal where he held his first solo exhibition at L'Échourie, founded the Galerie L'Actuelle with Fernande Saint-Martin, his future wife (also in 1955) and was one of the founding members of The Non-Figurative Artists' Association of Montreal in 1956. Between 1963 and 1969, he created hard edge paintings consisting of colour in vertical bands of equal width placed on a flat picture plane called the Stripe series. The National Gallery of Canada, acquired a canvas from the series.

Molinari was selected by Lawrence Alloway for the Guggenheim International Award 1964 exhibition. His paintings were seen in New York, Honolulu, Berlin, Ottawa and Buenos Aires. In 1965, his works appeared in The Responsive Eye at the Museum of Modern Art in New York along with works by artists such as Frank Stella. They were also seen in The Deceived Eye in Fort Worth, Texas; and in a fourth show, a New York solo exhibition at East Hampton Gallery. His work was described by reviewers in glowing terms as "Pop spelled 'Pow!'— in these handsome paintings the message comes across visually".

In 1967, he received a Guggenheim Fellowship and in 1968, the prestigious David Bright Prize at the 34th Biennale di Venezia for which he and Ulysse Comtois had been selected by Brydon Smith. From 1969 to 1970, Molinari created "checkerboard" paintings (he titled them "Structures") dividing the verticals by the horizontal and in 1971, he began to bisect each stripe, creating a new format of triangles. In the late 1970s, he created the Quantificateur series and, in the years before his death, the Checkerboard paintings (he called them the Continuum series).

Molinari taught for 27 years at Sir George Williams University and Concordia University, retiring in 1997. In 2004, Concordia recognized him with a posthumous honorary doctorate.

An avid art collector, his extensive private collection included the work of Mondrian and the manuscript pages of Mondrian's original defition of Neo-Plasticism (1926), Matisse, John Cage, Jasper Johns, and Quebec artists Denis Juneau, John Lyman, and Ozias Leduc. His obituary in the National Post quoted the then director of the Art Gallery of Ontario, Matthew Teitelbaum, as saying he owned Barnett Newman, Richard Serra, Francis Bacon, Piet Mondrian and Ellsworth Kelly.

In 1997, he established the 'Molinari Quartet' through the Molinari Foundation, a group that has been active now for twenty-five plus years.

In 2004, Guido Molinari died of pneumonia after having bone cancer, which had migrated from his lungs. His East Montreal studio at 3290 St. Catherine Street East remains intact and open to the public.

== Selected public exhibitions ==
From 1953, Molinari exhibited his work, primarily in America and Europe. His first solo museum survey was organised by the MacKenzie Art Gallery in Regina in 1964 and toured to the Vancouver Art Gallery. He had exhibitions or was included in group shows in a host of other institutions, including in Guido Molinari: 1951-1961, Peintures en noir et blanc/ The Black and White Paintings (1961) curated and catalogue by Gary Dufour which toured Canada; the Guggenheim Museum (Guggenheim International Award show, 1964, and in 1967); the Museum of Modern Art in New York (The Responsive Eye, 1965); in 49th Parallels: New Canadian Art (1971), Ringling Museum of Art curated and catalogue by Dennis Young; at the National Gallery of Canada (retrospective curated and catalogue by Pierre Théberge, 1976); and the Musée d'art contemporain de Montréal (retrospective, 1995).

== Selected works in public collections ==
Molinari's work is in national collections and in international collections such as the Museum of Modern Art in New York, and the Kunstmuseum Reutlingen concrete.

== Honours and awards ==
Molinari won a Guggenheim Fellowship in 1967, the David Bright Prize at the 34th Venice Biennale (1968), was made an Officer of the Order of Canada in 1971, received the Victor Martyn Lynch-Staunton Award (1973) and won the Prix Paul-Émile-Borduas in 1980.

== Memberships ==
He was a member of the Royal Canadian Academy of Arts (1969).

== Record sale prices ==
At a sale at Heffel Auction House, Vancouver, 25 May 2016, Guido Molinari's Sans titre, 84 x 96 in 213.4 x 243.8 cm, acrylic on canvas, Estimate: $100,000 - $150,000 CDN, sold for: $354,000 CDN (premium included). In a sale of 15 June 2022 at the Cowley Abbott Auction, Toronto, Molinari's Série noir/blanc, acrylic on canvas, signed and dated "11/67" on the reverse, 81 x 68 ins ( 205.7 x 172.7 cms ), realized a price of $264,000.00.

== Documentaries ==
- Guido Molinari: The Colour of Memory
