= Fernand Toupin =

Canadian artist (1930–2009)

- Born: 1930; Montreal, Quebec
- Died: 2009; Terrebonne
- Known for: painter

Fernand Toupin RCA (1930, Montreal–2009 Terrebonne) was a Québécois abstract painter best known as a first-generation member of the avant-garde movement known as Les Plasticiens. Like other members of the group, his shaped paintings drew upon the tradition of geometric abstraction, and he cited Mondrian as a forerunner. In 1959, Toupin began working with a more lyrical, though abstract, way of painting. The last decade of his career saw his return to geometric abstraction. Like Jean-Paul Mousseau, Toupin created works which lay outside the standard boundaries of art such as his stage sets for ballets.

== Solo exhibitions ==
Beginning with his first early-career retrospectives in 1967 and 1972 organized by the Musée d'art contemporain de Montréal and the Canadian Cultural Centre, Paris, Toupin's work was the subject of several gallery and museum exhibitions, both in Canada and abroad. The Musée d'art de Joliette organized a retrospective in 1986 and the Musée du Bas-Saint-Laurent in 2003, among others.

1959 Galerie Denyse Delrue, Montréal

1962 Galerie Agnès Lefort, Montréal

1965 Galerie Camille Hébert, Montréal

1967 Retrospective, Musée d'art contemporain de Montréal

1970 Galerie Arnaud, Paris

1970 Galerie Gilles Corbeil, Montréal

1972 Galerie Arnaud, Paris

1972 Retrospective, Canadian Cultural Centre, Paris

1974 Galerie Bernard Desroches, Montréal

1974 Suite d’Automne, Musée d'art contemporain de Montréal

1976 Galerie Arnaud, Paris

1976 Galerie Bernard Desroches, Montréal

1976 Olympic Stadium, Montréal

1977 Place des Arts, Montréal

1977 Les Jeunesses Musicales du Canada, Mont-Orford

1979 Galerie Frédéric Palardy, Saint-Lambert

1979 Claude Gadoury Art Moderne, Montréal

1980 Galerie Gilles Corbeil, Montréal

1980 Dominion-Corinth Gallery, Ottawa

1981 Retrospective, Collège André-Grasset, Montréal

1982 Galerie Lacerte Guimont, Sillery

1983 Galerie Frédéric Palardy, Saint-Lambert

1984 Galerie Présence, Montréal

1985 La Galerie, Montréal

1986 Galerie Frédéric Palardy, Saint-Lambert

1986 Retrospective, Musée d'art de Joliette

1988 Galerie Bernard Desroches, Montréal

1990 Galerie Bernard Desroches, Montréal

1995 Riverin-Arlogos Art Contemporain, Eastman

2001 Galerie Bernard, Montréal

2003 Retrospective, Musée du Bas-Saint-Laurent, Rivière-du-Loup

2004 Retrospective, Galerie Montcalm, Gatineau

2005 Galerie Bernard, Montréal

2005 Retrospective, Galerie Renée-Blain, Brossard

2006 Retrospective, Musée régional de la Côte Nord, Sept-Iles

2007 Retrospective, Acadia University Art Gallery, Wolfsville, Nova Scotia

2008 Retrospective, Colline Gallery, Edmundston, New Brunswick

2009 Galerie Bernard, Montréal

2009 Retrospective, Maison de la culture Villeray, Montréal

2010 Retrospective, miniature works, Galerie Bernard, Montréal

2011 Retrospective, Galerie Lamoureux Ritzenhoff, Montréal

2013 Galerie Bernard, Montréal

2015 Galerie Bernard, Montréal

== Selected group exhibitions ==
Toupin showed in the exhibitions of the Plasticien group such as the 1955 show at L'Échourie, Montréal as well as in many exhibitions later, both in Canada and abroad. His work was included in the 1975 Canadian canvas show, a travelling exhibit of large paintings to nine Canadian museums and in the 1992 Les Plasticiens exhibition, National Gallery of Canada and in the 2013 Les Plasticiens and the 1950s–1960s, Musée national des beaux-arts du Québec. In 2022, he was included in Territoires insoupçonnés, Galerie Bernard, Montréal.

1954 Petit salon d’été, Librairie-galerie Tranquille, Montréal

1955 Les Plasticiens, L'Échourie, Montréal

1956 Toupin and Belzile, Montreal Museum of Fine Arts, Gallery XII

1956 Jeune sculpture, Ile Sainte-Hélène, Montréal

1956 Les moins de trente ans, Ile Sainte-Hélène, Montréal

1956 Duo Exhibition, Canada/United States, Parma Gallery, New York

1958 Salon de la jeune peinture, École des beaux-arts de Montréal (winner of first prize)

1958 Les lauréats du Salon de la jeune peinture 1958, Galerie Denyse Delrue, Montréal

1959 Art abstrait, École des beaux-arts de Montréal

1962 Two Worlds Festival, Spoleto, Italy

1966 Canadian Art, travelling exhibit across Canada from the Sayde and Samuel Bronfman collection

1970 Québec Pavillon, Osaka World Expo, Japan

1972 Fourth International Paintings Festival, Cagnes-sur-Mer, France (winner of national prize for Canada)

1973 Galerie Raymonde Cazenave, Paris

1975 Canadian canvas, travelling exhibit of large paintings to nine Canadian museums

1976 Randall Galleries, New York

1977 Jauran et les premiers plasticiens, Musée d'art contemporain de Montréal

1980 Art Expo, International Art Exposition, New York Coliseum, New York

1980 La collection permanente du Musée, Musée d'art contemporain de Montréal

1980 Dix ans de propositions géométriques, Musée d'art contemporain de Montréal

1980 Randall Galleries, New York

1984 Arte Universal A Través De Los Tiempos, Museo del Palacio de Bellas Artes, Mexico City

1987 Accents de la collection Lavalin, Galerie Lavalin, Montréal

1989 Avant-garde des années ’50 et ’60, Galerie Bernard Desroches, Montréal

1991 Tokyo Central Museum, Japan

1992 La collection: tableau inaugural, Musée d'art contemporain de Montréal

1992 Les Plasticiens, National Gallery of Canada, Musée national des beaux-arts du Québec, Winnipeg Art Gallery

2005 Les Plasticiens, Galerie Simon Blais, Montréal

2008 Cape Breton University Art Gallery, Sydney, Nova Scotia

2011 Quiet Mutinies : Art in Québec in the 1950s, The Triangle Gallery of Visual Arts, Calgary, Alberta

2012 La question de l’abstraction, Musée d’art contemporain de Montréal

2013 Les Plasticiens et les années 1950 et 1960, Musée national des beaux-arts du Québec

2013 The Plasticiens and Beyond: Montreal 1955-1970, Varley Art Gallery, Markham, Ontario

2014 Mid-Century Modern, Museum London, London, Ontario

2014 Dialogues formels, Musée d’art contemporain de Baie-Saint-Paul, Québec

2015 Dialogues de l’œil, Permanent Collection of the City of Gatineau

2016 Abstracta Delecta: The Quebec Painters, Winchester Galleries, Victoria, B.C.

2017 Montréal d’hier à aujourd’hui, Galerie Michel-Ange, Montréal

2019 Couleurs Manifestes, Musée des Beaux-arts de Sherbrooke

2022 Territoires insoupçonnés, Galerie Bernard, Montréal

== Selected miscellaneous exhibitions ==
- 1970–72 Tapestries, ateliers Pierre Daquin, Paris
- 1971 Germinal, mural for the Musée d'art contemporain de Montréal
- 1974 Set creation for "Au-delà du temps/Time out of mind", Les Grands Ballets Canadiens de Montréal
- 1975 Errances, art book on poems by Fernand Ouellette including seven lithographs
- 1977 Set creation for "La Scouine", Les Grands Ballets Canadiens
- 1977 Hochelaga, mural for the Wilfrid-Pelletier Concert Hall at Place des Arts in Montréal
- 1978 Prochain épisode, art book on the novel by Hubert Aquin including 14 lithographs and one etching
- 2005 Participates in the documentary of André Desrochers, "L’intuition intuitionnée" on the first movement of Plasticiens

== Selected public collections ==
Toupin's work is in the public art collections of the National Gallery of Canada, Ottawa; the Musée national des beaux-arts du Québec, Québec; the Musée d'art contemporain de Montréal; the Art Gallery of Nova Scotia, Halifax; and in many other public institutions, both in Canada and abroad.

National Gallery of Canada, Ottawa

Musée national des beaux-arts du Québec, Québec

Montreal Museum of Fine Arts

Musée d'art contemporain de Montréal

Musée des beaux-arts de Sherbrooke

Musée d’art de Joliette

Musée Laurier

Musée du Bas-Saint-Laurent, Rivière-du-Loup

Place des arts, Montréal

University of Montreal

City of Montreal (Saint-Laurent district)

City of Brossard

City of Gatineau

Selection Reader`s Digest

Loto-Québec

Banque Nationale du Canada

University of Lethbridge, Alberta

Simon Fraser University, Vancouver

University of Saskatchewan, Saskatoon

Cape Breton University, Sydney, Nova Scotia

Art Gallery of Nova Scotia, Halifax, Nova Scotia

Museum London, London, Ontario

Statische Kunstgalerie, Bochum, Germany

Centre national d'art contemporain, Paris

== Memberships ==
Toupin was a founding member of The Non-Figurative Artists' Association of Montreal (1956). He also was a member of the Royal Canadian Academy of Arts (1977).

== Awards ==
- 1958 First prize, Salon de la jeune peinture, École des beaux-arts de Montréal
- 1972 Fourth international paintings Festival, Cagnes-sur-Mer, France (winner of the national prize for Canada)
