= Yulia Biriukova =

Russian born Canadian painter

- Born: 1897; Russia
- Died: 1972 (aged 74–75); Toronto, Ontario, Canada
- Known for: Painting

Yulia Biriukova, "Portrait of J. E. H. MacDonald", 1930

Yulia Biriukova (1897–1972) was a Russian-born Canadian painter known for her portraits. She was the sister of the architect Alexandra Biriukova.

== Biography ==
Biriukova was born in 1897 in Russia. Her father was Dmitry Biriukoff (1864 Russian Empire–1928 Rome, Italy), Russian nobleman, who was the chief civil engineer on the Trans-Siberian Railway. Her mother Julia Biriukova (1867 Russian Empire–1925 Rome, Italy), maiden name Glass, was raised in the family of State Councillor Wladyslaw Wojciechowski (Vladislav Voicehovsky) in Sankt-Petersburg. She with her parents and sister Alexandra fled Russia, refugees of the Russian Revolution. Her family first went to Hong Kong in 1920, then Rome in 1922, settling in Canada in 1929.

Yulia arrived in Toronto having already established a reputation as a "European artist" and was soon receiving commissions for portraits. When the sisters arrived in Toronto they were befriended by members of the Canadian artists the Group of Seven. Biriukova created portraits of two member of the Group of Seven; A. Y. Jackson (1882–1974), and J. E. H. MacDonald (1873–1932).

Biriukova studied at the Imperial Academy of Arts in Saint Petersburg, the Royal Academy of Arts in Rome, and the Royal Academy of Arts in London. She exhibited her work at the Ontario Society of Artists annual exhibitions in 1930, 1931, 1934, and 1936. She also exhibited at the Royal Canadian Academy of Arts annual exhibitions 1933 and 1937.

Biriukova died in 1972 in Toronto.
