= J. E. H. MacDonald =

English-Canadian artist

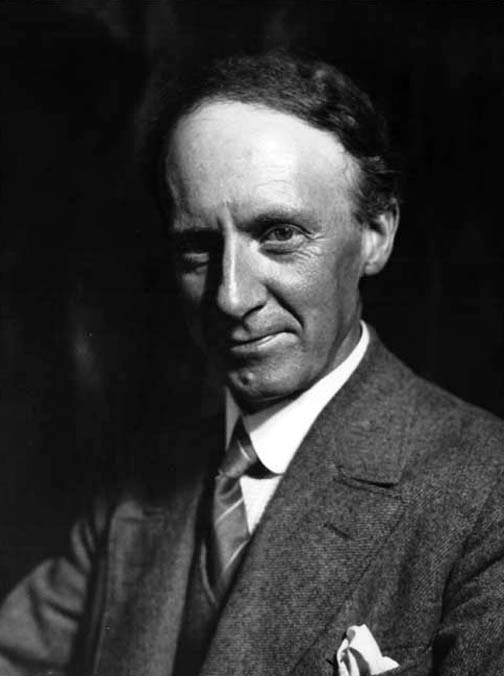
- MacDonald in 1930
- Born: James Edward Hervey MacDonald; 12 May 1873; Durham, England
- Died: 26 November 1932 (aged 59); Toronto, Ontario, Canada
- Education: Hamilton Art School; Central Ontario School of Art and Design
- Known for: Painter
- Notable work: The Tangled Garden (1916); The Solemn Land (1921)
- Movement: Group of Seven
- Spouse: Harriet Joan Lavis (m. 1899)

James Edward Hervey MacDonald RCA (12 May 1873 – 26 November 1932) was an English-born Canadian artist, best known as a member of the Group of Seven who asserted a distinct national identity combined with a common heritage stemming from early modernism in Europe in the early twentieth century. He was the father of the illustrator, graphic artist and designer Thoreau MacDonald.

== Life ==
=== Early years ===
MacDonald was born on 12 May 1873 near Durham, England, to an English mother, Margaret (Usher), and a Canadian father, William MacDonald, who was a cabinetmaker. In 1887 at the age of 14, he emigrated with his family to Hamilton, Ontario. That year he began his first training as an artist at the Hamilton Art School, where he studied under John Ireland and Arthur Heming. In 1889, they moved again to Toronto, where he studied commercial art and became active in the Toronto Art Students' League, a society which believed in sketching out-of-doors. He continued his training at the Central Ontario School of Art and Design, where he studied with George Agnew Reid and William Cruikshank.

In 1894 or 1895, MacDonald took a position as a commercial designer at Grip Ltd., an important commercial art firm, where he further developed his design skills. In the coming years, he encouraged his colleagues—including future artist Tom Thomson—to develop their skills as painters. In 1899, MacDonald married Joan Lavis, and two years later they had a son, Thoreau. MacDonald worked as a designer at Grip Ltd. until 1903, then at Carlton Studios in London from 1903 to 1907, and returned to Grip Ltd. in 1907. Whilst at Carlton, he worked with Norman Mills Price, William Tracy Wallace, and Albert Angus Turbayne.

=== Early career as an artist ===
In 1911, MacDonald resigned his designer position at Grip Ltd. and moved with his wife and child to Thornhill, Ontario, to pursue a career as a landscape artist. To supplement his income, he worked occasionally as a freelance designer until 1921. After developing his own style as a painter, he organized a show of his work at the Arts and Letters Club of Toronto in November 1911. Fellow artist Lawren Harris—a member of the Royal Canadian Academy of Arts—was so impressed with MacDonald's work that he asked if they could work together. Harris encouraged MacDonald to continue painting and show his work whenever possible. The following year they organized their first joint exhibition. In 1912, MacDonald was widely recognized for his contributions to an exhibition at the Ontario Society of Artists.

In January 1913, MacDonald and Harris traveled to the Albright Art Gallery, today's Albright-Knox Gallery, in Buffalo, New York, where they attended the Exhibition of Contemporary Scandinavian Art and saw post-Impressionist and expressionist landscape paintings by artists such as Gustaf Fjaestad and Vilhelm Hammershøi. The two artists felt that the approach to the northern Scandinavian wilderness could be adopted by Canadian painters to create on canvas a truly Canadian form of landscape art. Later that year, commercial artists based in Toronto began to show interest in the potential of original Canadian expression; these artists began to congregate around MacDonald and Harris. In the spring of 1913, MacDonald wrote to A. Y. Jackson, inviting him to come to Toronto, which he did in May.

MacDonald created the poster Canada and the Call (1914) soon after the outbreak of the First World War. Intended as a promotional poster for the Canadian Patriotic Fund, Canada and the Call advertises an exhibition of paintings organized by the Royal Canadian Academy of Arts.

In March 1916, MacDonald exhibited The Tangled Garden at the Ontario Society of Artists. Though derided by art critics of the day, it was a fairly conventional post-impressionistic painting of sunflowers—one that recalls Vincent van Gogh's treatment of the subject from nearly forty years before, but in which MacDonald would have relied on sketches of sunflowers he made in his own garden at Thornhill, Ontario. Accustomed to the smooth blending and muted tones of Canadian academic art in the style of the Canadian Art Club, the critics were taken aback by the brightness and intensity of the colours. The art critic for the Toronto Daily Star called it "an incoherent mass of colour". Hostile art critics thereafter singled out MacDonald for attacks in the press.

In the autumn of 1918, MacDonald, Harris, and other artists interested in their new Canadian approach to painting travelled to the Algoma district north of Lake Superior in a specially outfitted Algoma Central Railway car that functioned as a mobile artist studio. The group would hitch their car to trains travelling through the area, and when they found a scenic location, they would unhitch and spend time exploring and painting the wilderness. MacDonald would return to Algoma with his colleagues for the next several autumns. These trips would produce some of his most acclaimed paintings, including Mist Fantasy, Sand River, Algoma (1920) and The Solemn Land (1921), elegant works that are meditations on his longtime experience in design combined with fiery colour.

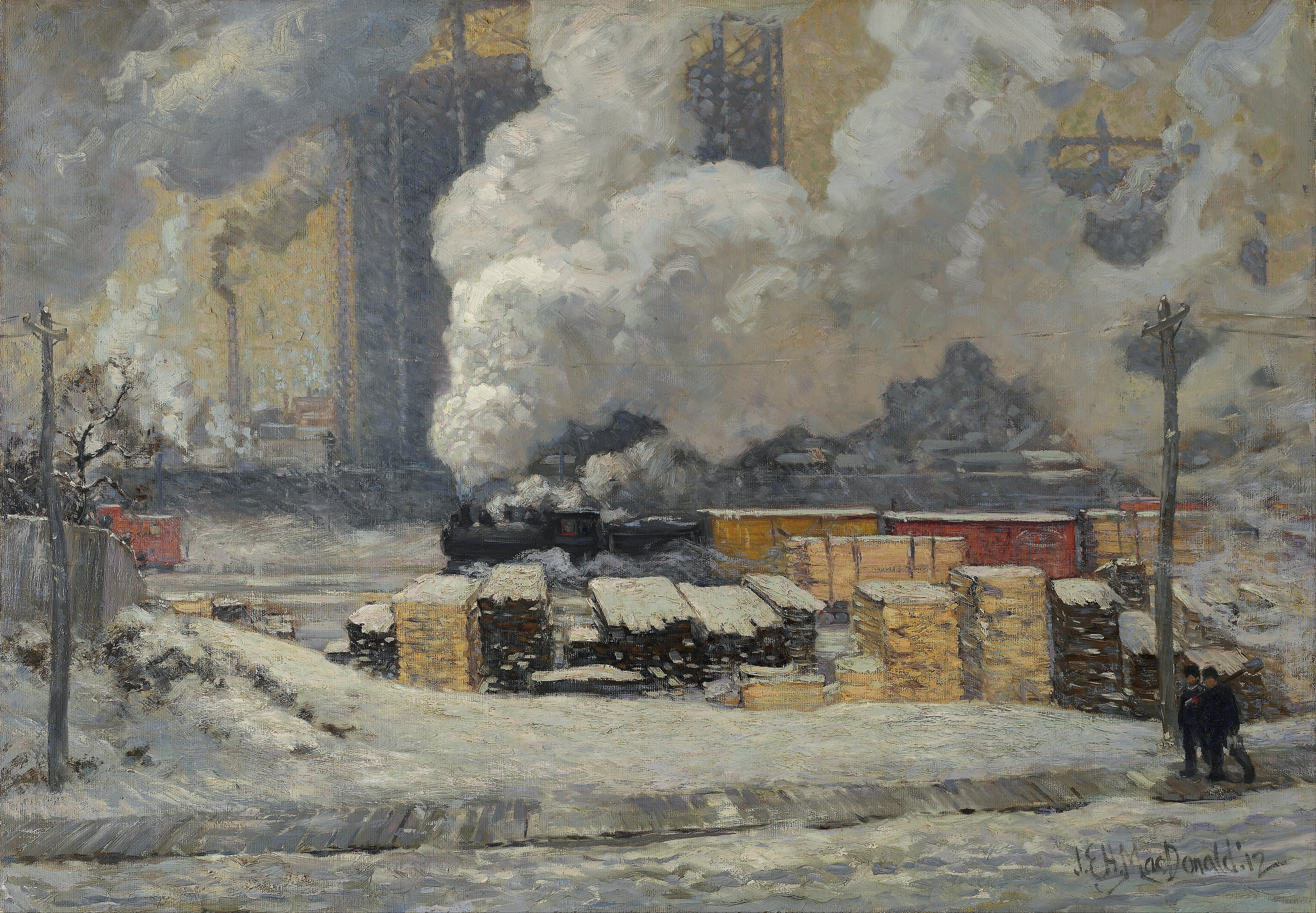
Tracks and Traffic, 1912, Art Gallery of Ontario, Toronto

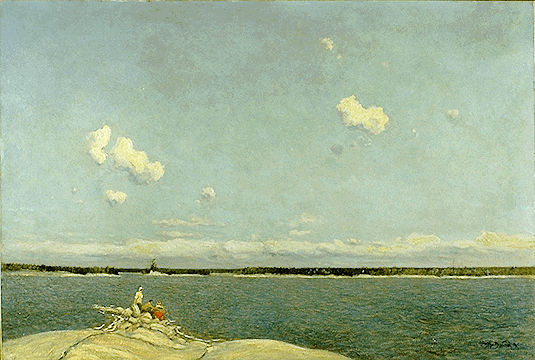
Fine Weather, Georgian Bay, 1913, Art Gallery of Ontario, Toronto

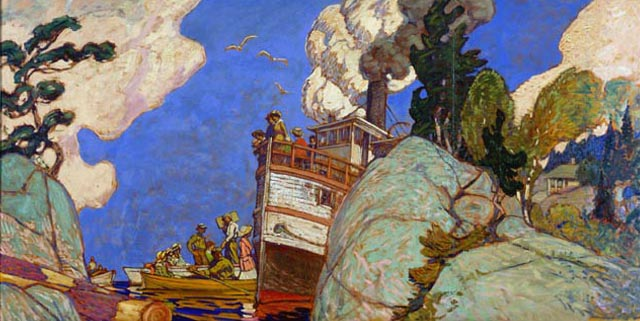
The Supply Boat, 1915–16, National Gallery of Canada, Ottawa

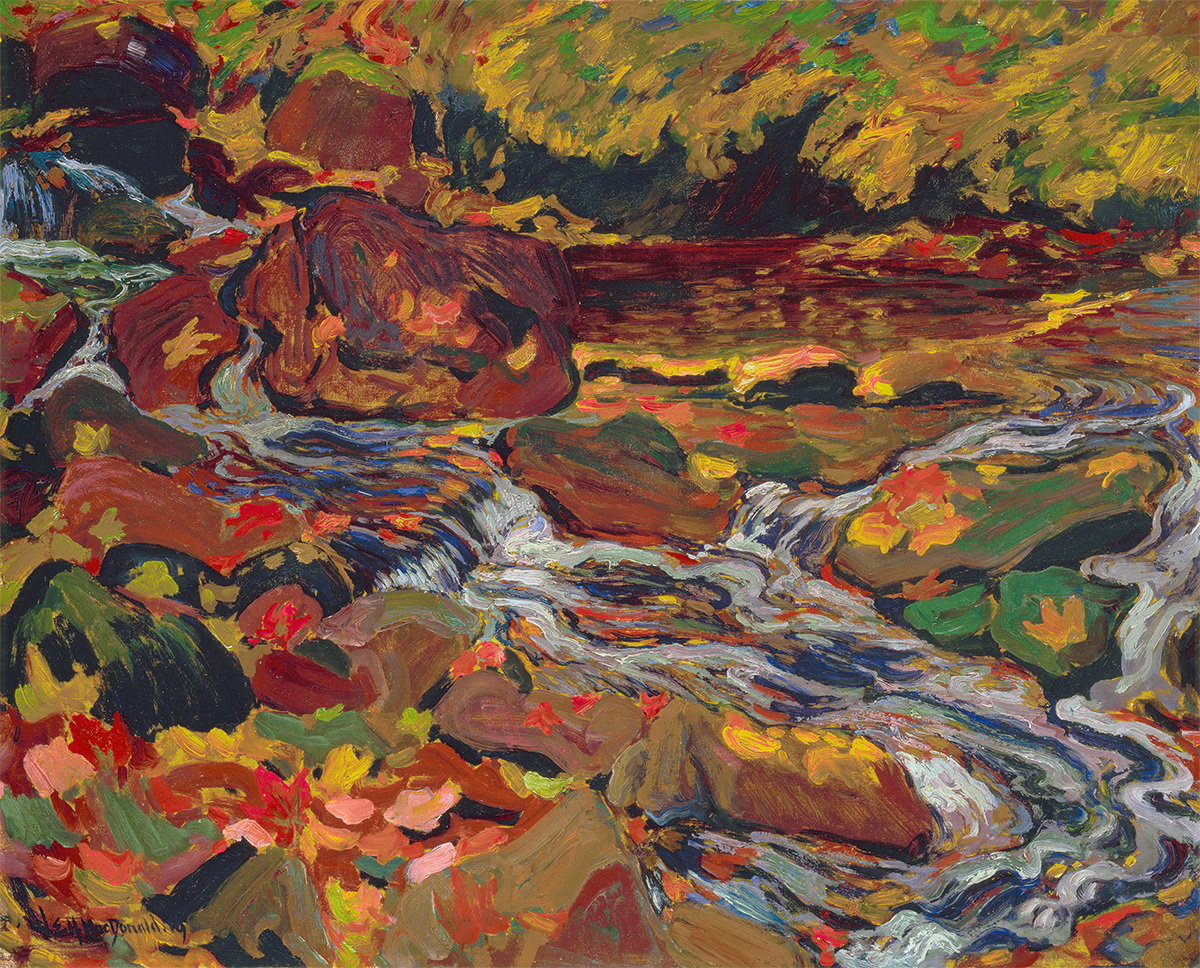
Leaves In the Brook, 1919, McMichael Canadian Art Collection, Kleinburg

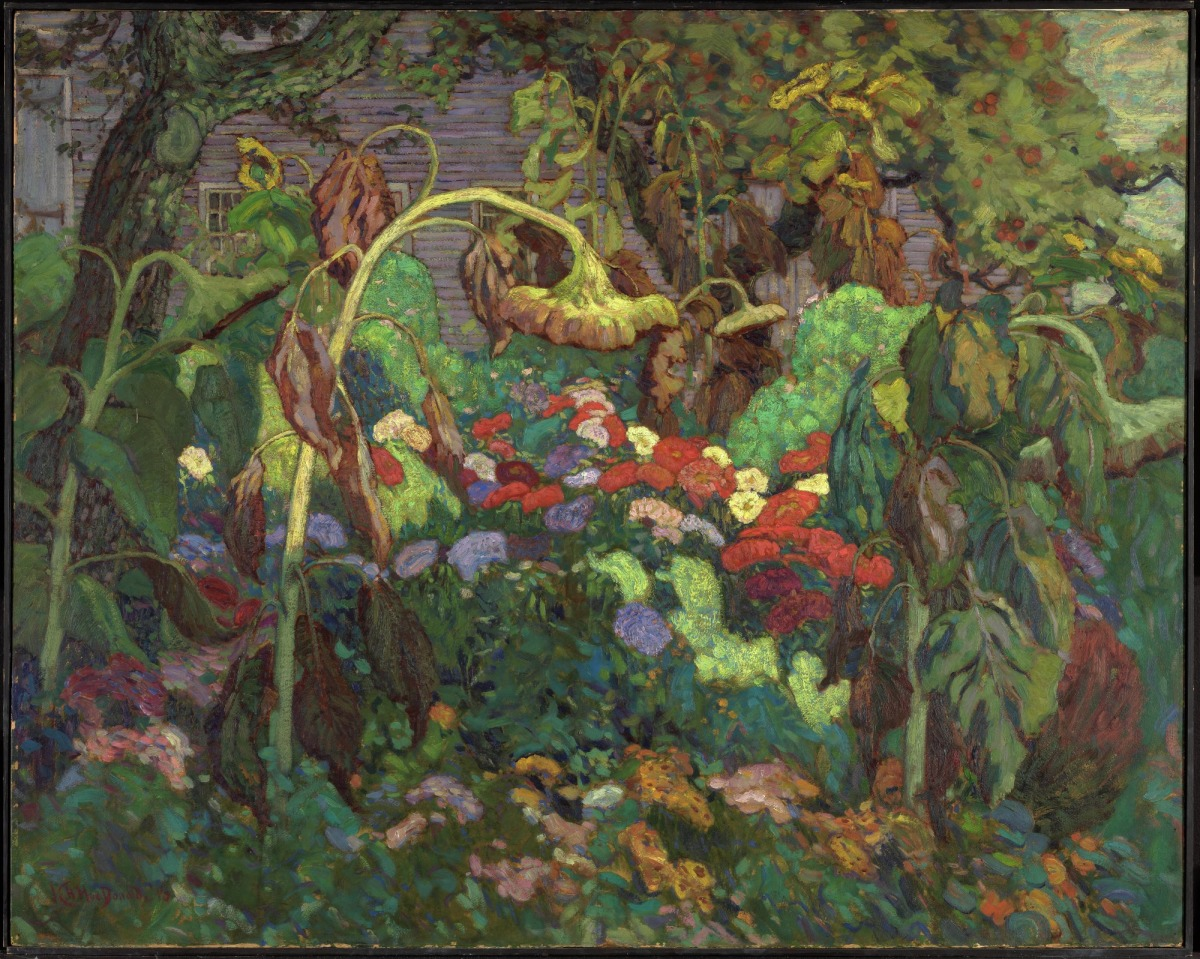
The Tangled Garden, 1916, National Gallery of Canada, Ottawa, Ontario

=== Group of Seven ===
In 1920, MacDonald co-founded the Group of Seven, which dedicated itself to promoting a distinct Canadian art developed through direct contact with the Canadian landscape. The other founding members were Frederick Varley, A. Y. Jackson, Lawren Harris, Frank Johnston, Arthur Lismer, and Franklin Carmichael. MacDonald had worked with Lismer, Varley, Johnston, and Carmichael at the design firm Grip Ltd. in Toronto. Together they initiated what they asserted was the first major Canadian national art movement, producing paintings directly inspired by the Canadian landscape. In 1921, MacDonald was appointed instructor in decorative art and commercial design at the Ontario College of Art and his teaching commitments somewhat curtailed his painting activities. However, every summer from 1924 until 1930, MacDonald travelled to the Canadian Rockies to paint the mountain landscapes that dominated his later work.

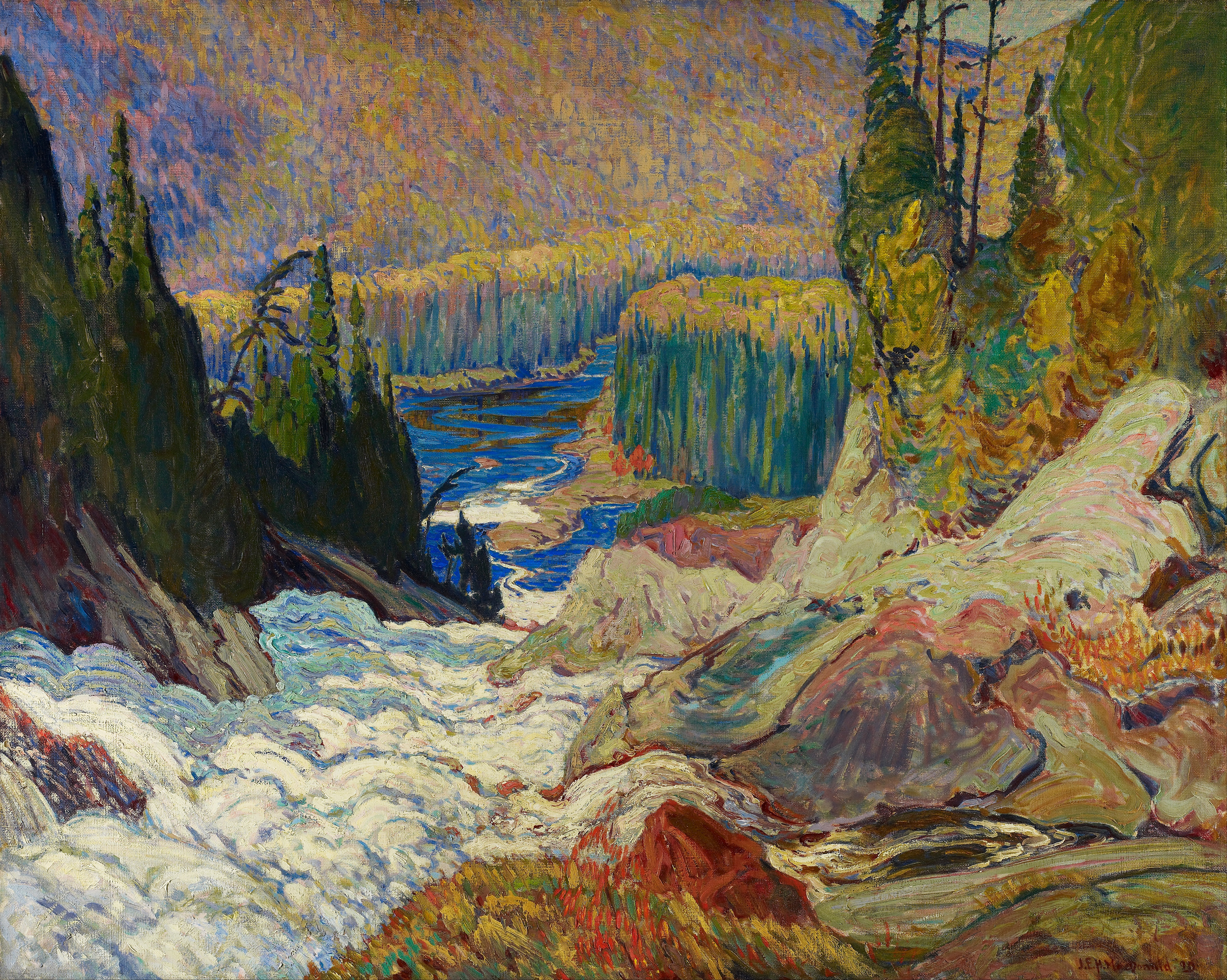
Falls, Montreal River, 1920, Art Gallery of Ontario, Toronto

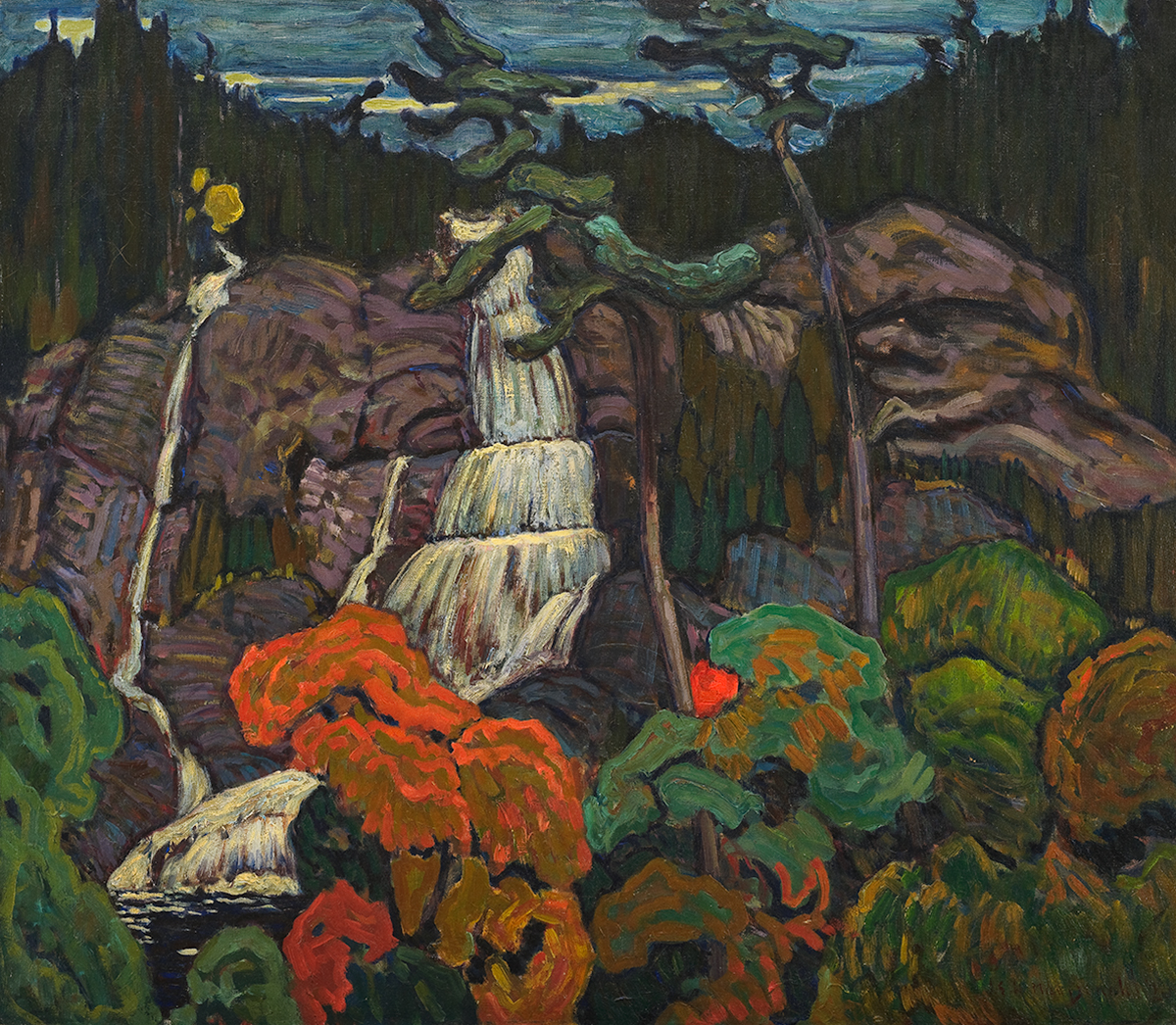
Algoma Waterfall, 1920, McMichael Canadian Art Collection, Kleinburg

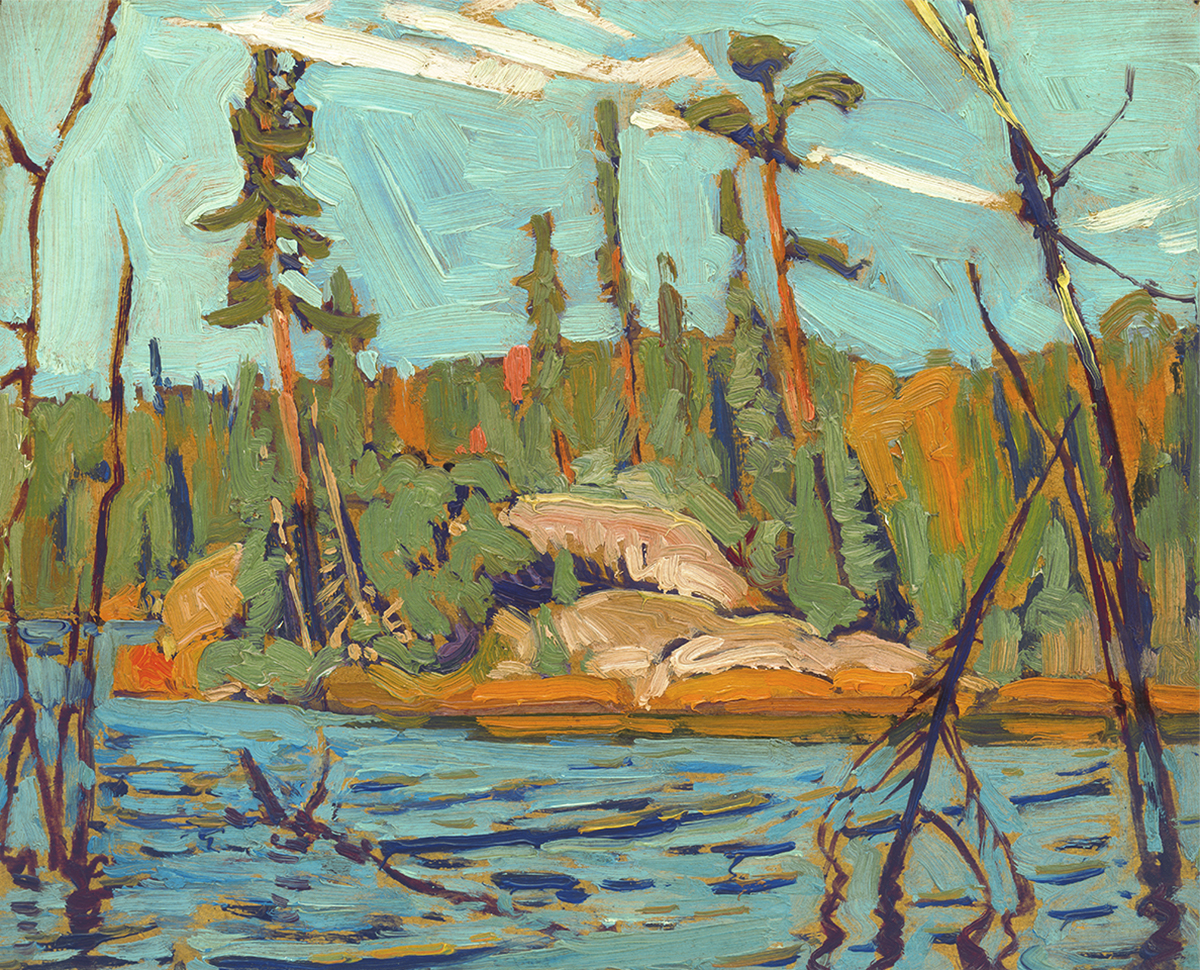
Moose Lake, Algoma, 1920, McMichael Canadian Art Collection, Kleinburg

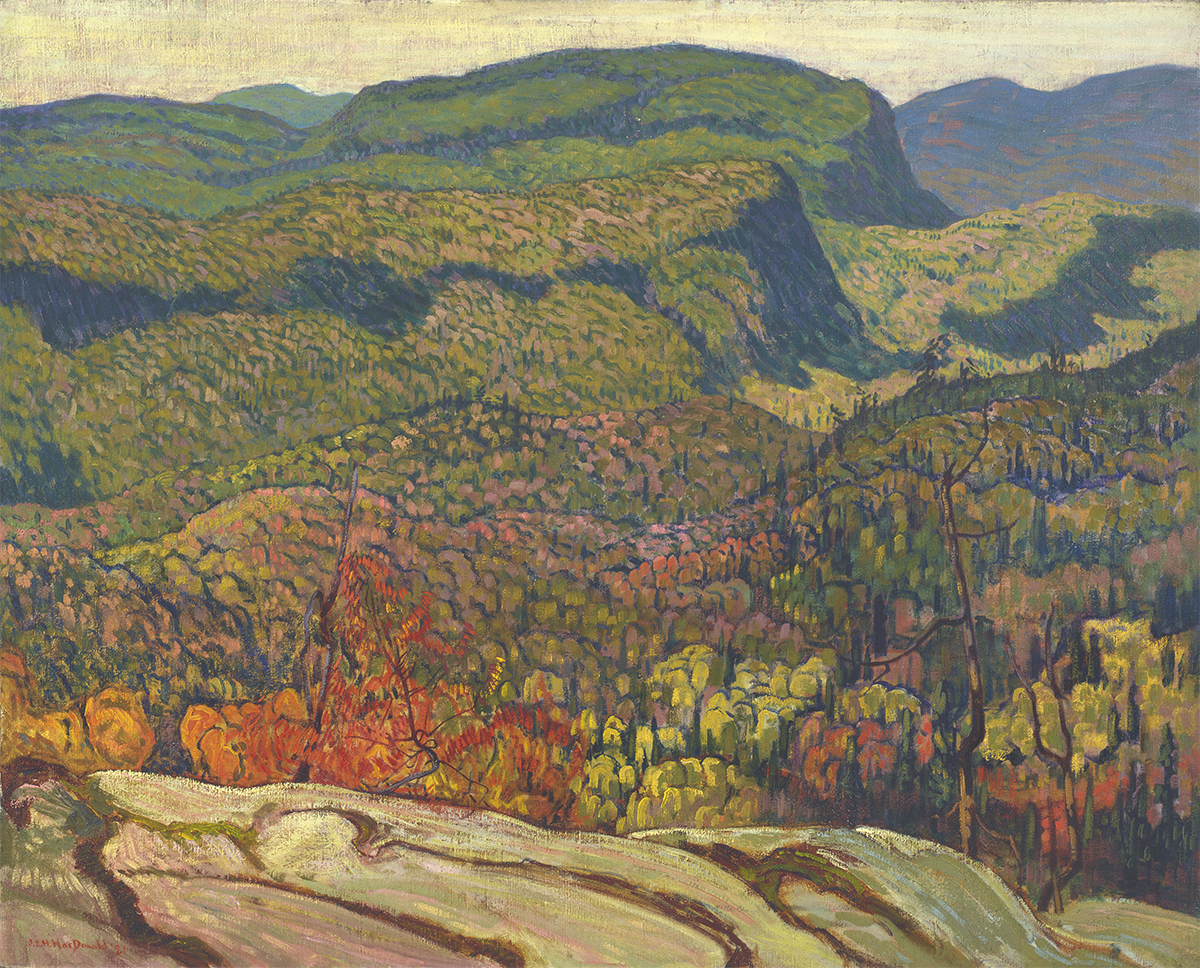
Forest Wilderness, 1921, McMichael Canadian Art Collection, Kleinburg

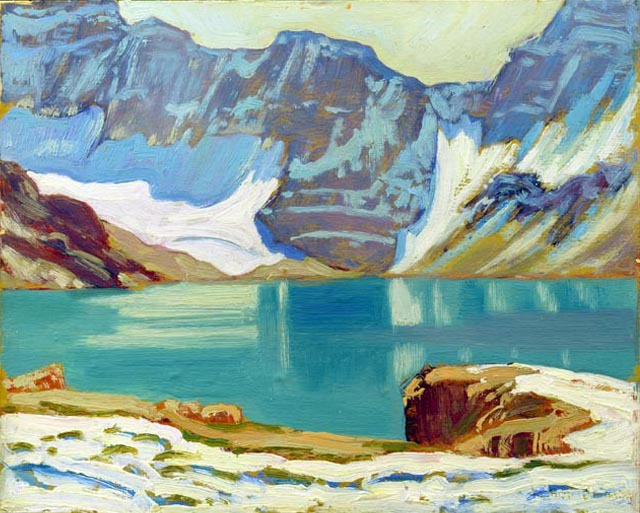
Lake McArthur, Yoho Park, 1924, National Gallery of Canada, Ottawa

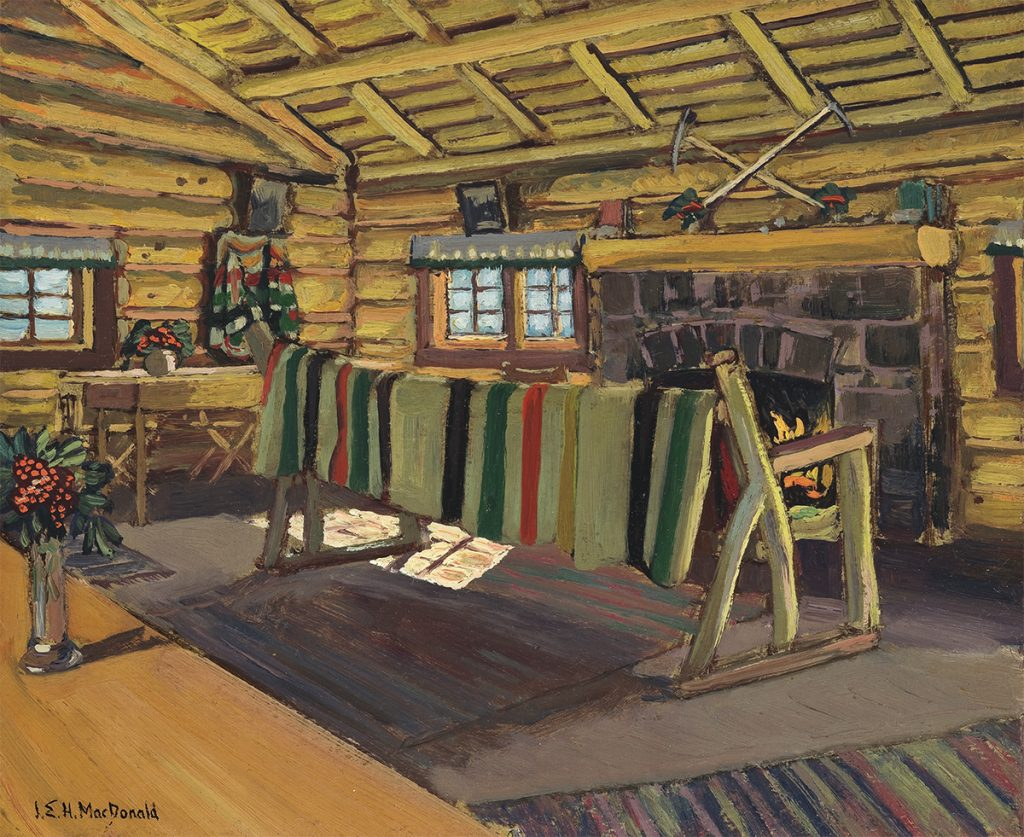
Lodge Interior, Lake O’Hara, c. 1925, McMichael Canadian Art Collection, Kleinburg

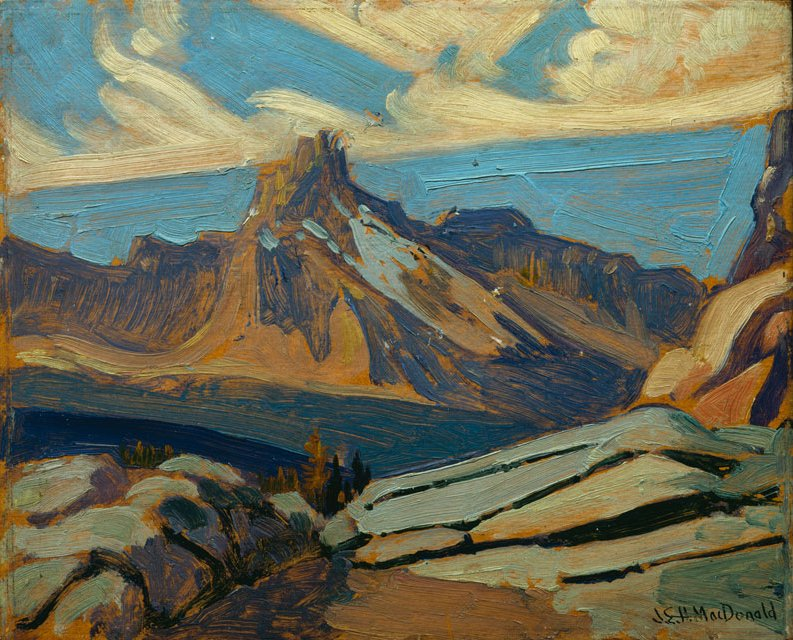
Cathedral Mountain, 1927, private collection

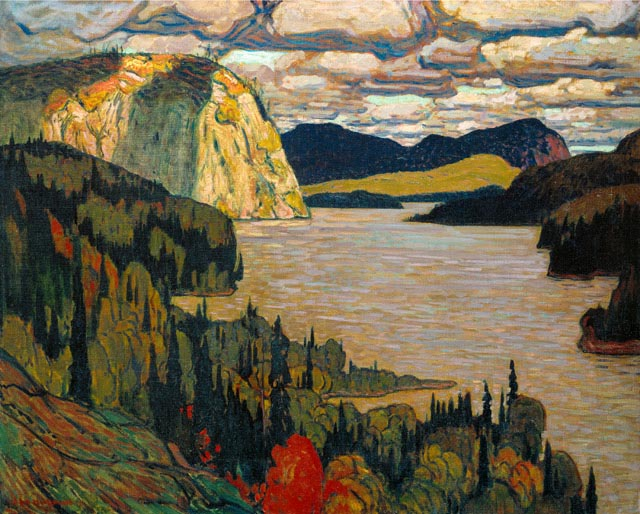
The Solemn Land, 1921, National Gallery of Canada, Ottawa

=== Later years ===
From 1928 until his death, MacDonald served as the Principal of the Ontario College of Art, and he painted with less frequency and less consistent success.

Today, MacDonald is viewed with general admiration for his art, with one writer commenting, "no Canadian landscape painter possessed a richer command of colour and pigment than J. E. H. MacDonald ... His brushwork is at once disciplined and vigorous. His best on-the-spot sketches possess an intensity and freshness of execution not dissimilar from Van Gogh." His former home and 4-acre (16,000 m^{2}) garden in Vaughan, Ontario have been restored. Owned by the City of Vaughan, they are open to the public.

MacDonald suffered a stroke in 1931, and spent the following summer recovering in Barbados. He died in Toronto on 26 November 1932 at the age of 59. He was buried at Prospect Cemetery in Toronto.

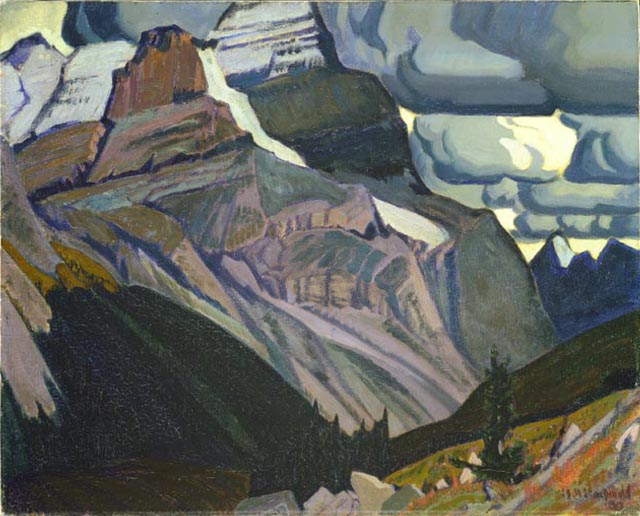
Dark Autumn, Rocky Mountains, 1930, National Gallery of Canada, Ottawa, Ontario

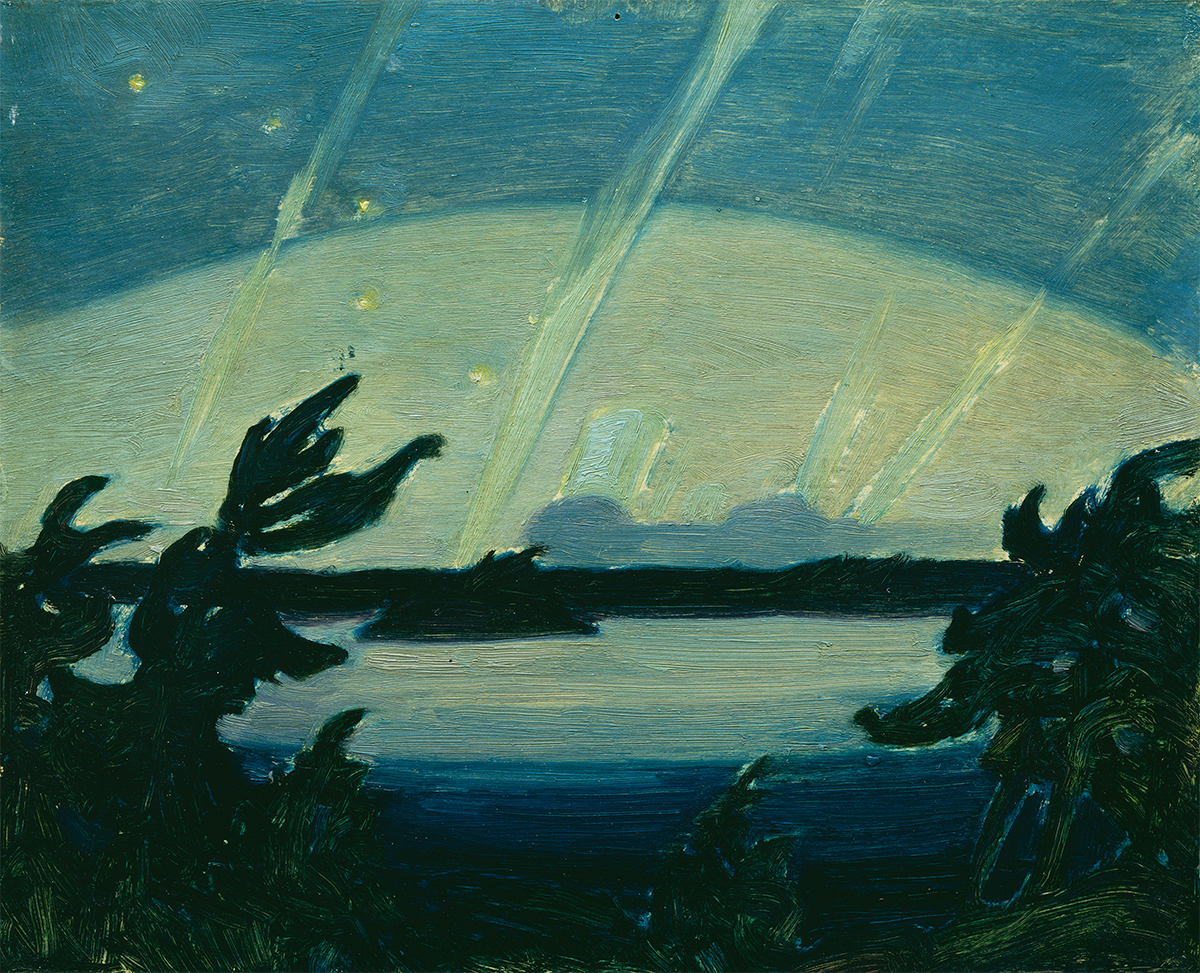
Aurora, Georgian Bay, 1931, McMichael Canadian Art Collection, Kleinburg

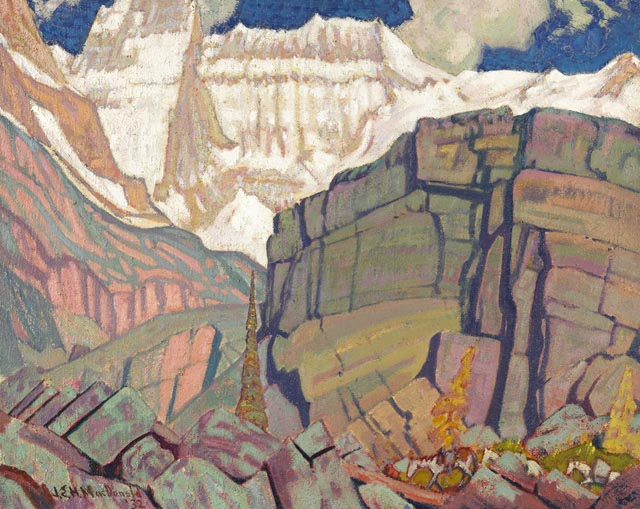
Mount Lefroy, 1932, National Gallery of Canada, Ottawa, Ontario

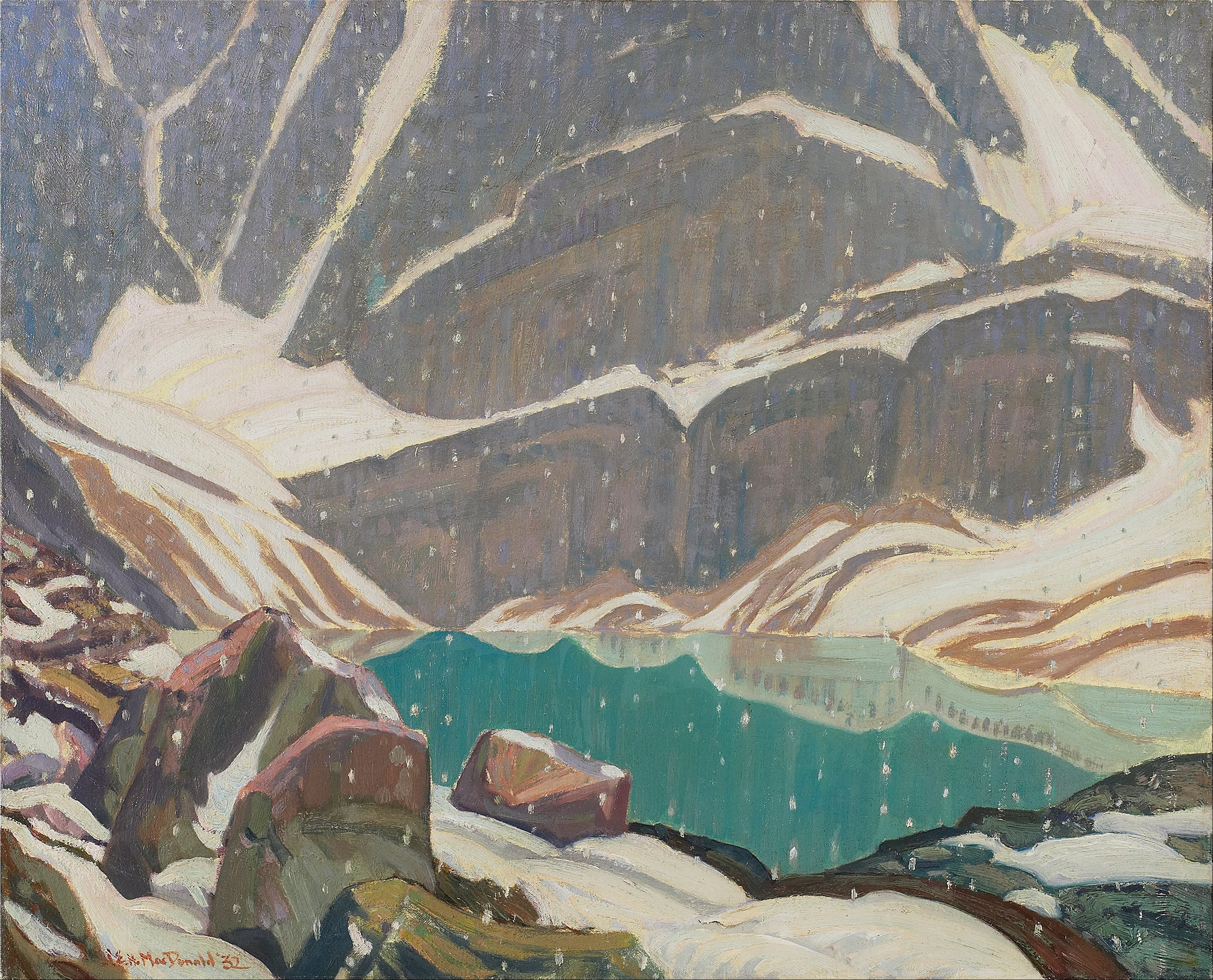
Mountain Solitude, Lake Oesa, 1932, Art Gallery of Ontario, Toronto, Ontario

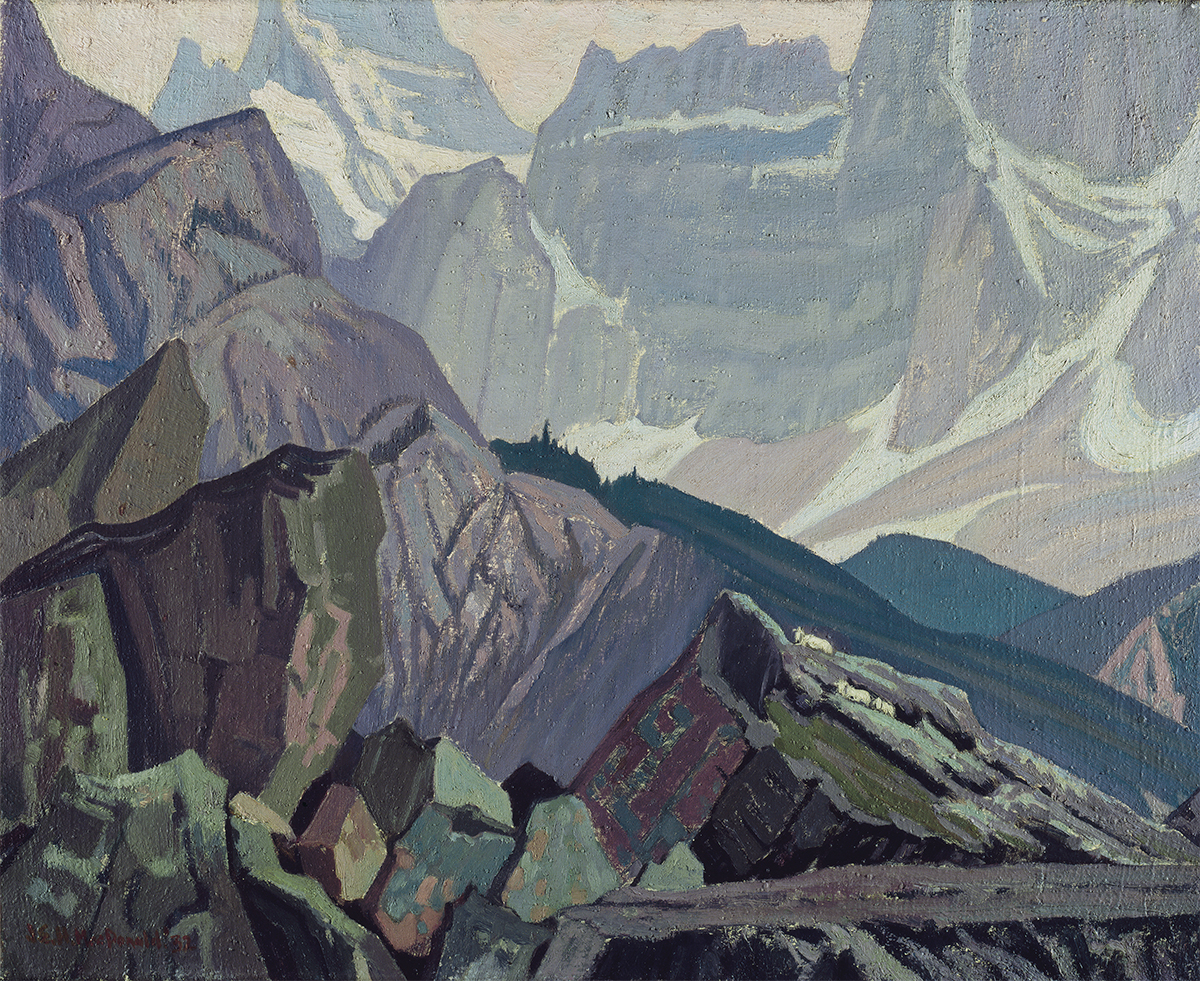
Goat Range Rocky Mountains, 1932, McMichael Canadian Art Collection, Kleinburg

== Legacy ==
On 8 June 1973 Canada Post issued 'J.E.H. MacDonald, painter, 1873–1932' designed by William Rueter based on MacDonald's Mist Fantasy, Northland (1922) in the Art Gallery of Ontario, Toronto. The 15¢ stamps were printed by Ashton-Potter Limited.

MacDonald has been designated as an Historic Person in the Directory of Federal Heritage Designations.

== Record sale prices ==
At the Cowley Abbott Spring Live Auction of Important Canadian Art, 2024, lot 101, Lake O’Hara (1925), oil on board, 8.5 x 10.5 in ( 21.6 x 26.7 cm ), Auction Estimate: $70,000.00 - $90,000.00, realized a price of $216,000.00.
