= Turbayne =

Turbayne is a surname. Notable people with the surname include:

- Albert Angus Turbayne (1866–1940), American book designer
- Colin Murray Turbayne (1916–2006), Australian philosopher
