= William Tracy Wallace =

Canadian-English artist and designer

W. T. Wallace
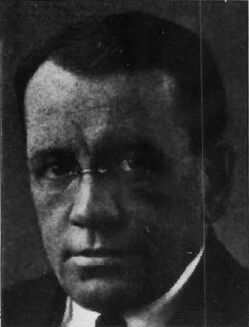
- Portrait, printed in 1923
- Born: William Tracy Wallace; 14 November 1880; Milton, Ontario, Canada
- Died: 29 February 1948 (aged 67); Kensington, London, England
- Education: Ontario College of Art; Goldsmiths' Institute; Westminster School of Art
- Spouse: Mary Jane Nesbit (m. 1906)

William Tracy Wallace (November 14, 1880 – February 29, 1948), known as W. T. Wallace, was a Canadian-English artist and designer.

== Early life ==
Wallace was born in Milton, Ontario in 1880. He studied at the Ontario College of Art and was a member of the Toronto Art Students' League. He took his first job with the Toronto Lithographing Company, later becoming a staff artist and reporter at Saturday Night.

== Publishing career ==
In 1902 Wallace immigrated to England with his business partners, Archibald Abernathy Martin, Thomas Garland Greene and Norman Mills Price. The group briefly studied at Goldsmiths' Technical and Recreative Institute and the Westminster School of Art before establishing Carlton Studios, an advertising and publishing graphics house based in London.

Carlton Studios became the largest graphic design company in the United Kingdom, reaching a clientele that included Boots the Chemists, Sandeman and State Express 555. The firm also claimed to have introduced the "studio idea" to Great Britain. In December 1903 J. E. H. MacDonald, future co-founder of the Group of Seven, joined the company; notable artists such as Albert Angus Turbayne and Alfred Garth Jones were also employed at Carlton.

During the First World War, business for the studio became increasingly difficult. As chairman of the Sales and Advertising Syndicate, Wallace decided that the company should be wound up voluntarily from December 1914. He later undertook work for the Ministry of Labour and National Service and finally joined the Labour Supply and Housing Division in the Admiralty, working there as an administrative assistant until the end of the war.

Following the war, Wallace was appointed as managing director of the National Trade Press Ltd., initially overseeing the publication of four trade journals under the "Organiser" title. He expanded the company's line of production and its export to British dominions. The NTP was one of the first publishers to develop the direct coloured reproduction of merchandise on art paper, setting a new standard for trade journal production. In 1926 George Newnes purchased the company's ordinary shares and several years later, Wallace's executive responsibilities were reduced as a result of his ill health.

== Personal life ==
William Tracy was born to John Wallace Jr. and Mary, née Lyon. His father and paternal grandfather ran the Milton Inn Hotel; his maternal grandfather was William D. Lyon, a prominent Ontarian politician.

He married Mary Jane Nesbit in 1906 and together they had 4 sons. Their third son, Lt. Bruce Martin Tiffany Wallace RNVR, was killed in January 1942 when his minesweeper HMT Unicity capsized and sank on sweeping duties off Blyth; he was posthumously awarded the Distinguished Service Cross for 'courage, zeal and determination' while minesweeping.

Wallace was a keen sailor, learning to handle boats in Lake Ontario during his childhood. He was elected a member of Itchenor Sailing Club in 1929, two years after its founding, and became intimately involved with ISC's early administration. He was a member of the General Committee between 1932 and 1938. In 1937, when members of ISC formed a "protest committee" to oppose plans to amalgamate the Club with the Royal Corinthian Yacht Club, Wallace played an important role in resolving the issue. He proposed the Rear Commodore, Geoffrey Lowles, to become the new Commodore and succeeded in arranging for over fifty individuals (comprising the differing cliques, factions, and recalcitrant members) to officially second him to the position.

He died in February 1948 at the age of 67.

== Sources ==
- Wright, Tony (1978). A History of Itchenor Sailing Club
