= Ontario Association of Architects =

Regulatory body for architects in Ontario, Canada

The Ontario Association of Architects (OAA) is the regulatory body responsible for registering and licensing all architects legally entitled to practice the scope of architecture in the Province of Ontario, Canada. It was founded in 1889.

== History ==
Formed during a broader late-19th-century push to professionalize architectural practice in Canada, the OAA emerged out of organizing efforts in Ontario and was established in 1889. Toronto architect Edmund Burke proposed the resolution that created the OAA and later served as its president (1894; 1905–1907). In the early 20th century, provincial bodies such as the OAA were complemented by the creation of the national Royal Architectural Institute of Canada (RAIC) in 1907, which provided a Canada-wide forum and coordination among existing provincial associations.

== Role and regulation ==
The practice of architecture in Canada is regulated under provincial legislation, with each province maintaining an association or institute responsible for admission, standards and discipline—roles filled in Ontario by the OAA.

The OAA also has an awards program which includes the Design Excellence Awards, Best Emerging Practice, and career achievement awards (such as the Lifetime Design Achievement and the Medal of Service).

== See also ==
- Royal Architectural Institute of Canada

== Notable members ==
- Alexandra Biriukova, first female member
