= Lawren Harris =

Canadian painter (1885–1970)

Lawren Harris CC, LL.D.
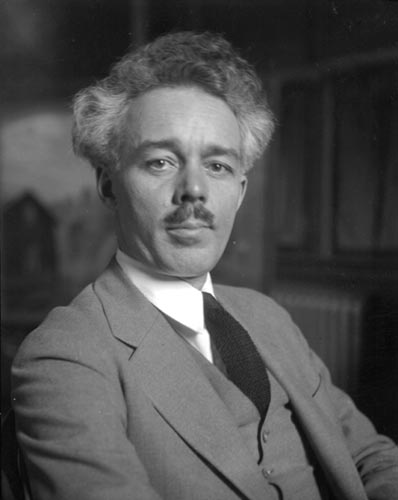
- Harris in 1926, photographed by M. O. Hammond
- Born: Lawren Stewart Harris; October 23, 1885; Brantford, Ontario, Canada
- Died: January 29, 1970 (aged 84); Vancouver, British Columbia, Canada
- Resting place: Kleinburg, Ontario, Canada
- Notable work: North Shore, Lake Superior, 1926
- Military Service
- Allegiance: Canada
- Branch: Canadian Army
- Service years: 1916–1918
- Rank: Lieutenant
- Unit: 10th Royal Grenadiers
- Conflicts: First World War
- Movement: Group of Seven

Lawren Stewart Harris CC LL. D. (October 23, 1885 – January 29, 1970) was a Canadian painter, best known as one of the founding members of the Group of Seven. He played a key role as a catalyst in Canadian art, as a visionary in Canadian landscape art and in the development of modern art in Canada.

== Early years ==
Harris was born on October 23, 1885, in Brantford, Ontario. He was the son of Thomas Morgan Harris and Annabelle Stewart. His father was secretary to the firm of A. Harris, Sons & Company Ltd., merchants of farm machinery, which merged with the Massey firm in 1891, forming the Massey-Harris Company, later known as Massey Ferguson. Lawren Harris's share of the fortune that resulted made him free from financial cares the rest of his life. Although born to wealth, he was an individual who made his own path in his own individual way. In 1894, his father died and the family moved to Toronto. In 1899, he began to board at St. Andrew's College, which was located in Rosedale in Toronto at the time, then in 1903 attended University College at the University of Toronto.

From 1904 to 1908, he studied in Berlin under Adolf Schlabitz, Franz Skarbina, and most likely Fritz von Wille, gaining an academic foundation similar to that which was offered by the Paris academies. Harris stayed in Berlin for three years, learning about Impressionism and Post-Impressionism as well as seeing exhibitions of German and European modern art. Among these exhibitions were several of the Berlin Secession and a comprehensive review of 19th century German art. In 1908, he travelled to Austria, Italy, France, and England before returning to Toronto. He brought back an influence not only from his teachers but from the Secessionist movement he had encountered in Berlin. Through his reading and teachers, he may also have learned about Theosophy.

== Career ==
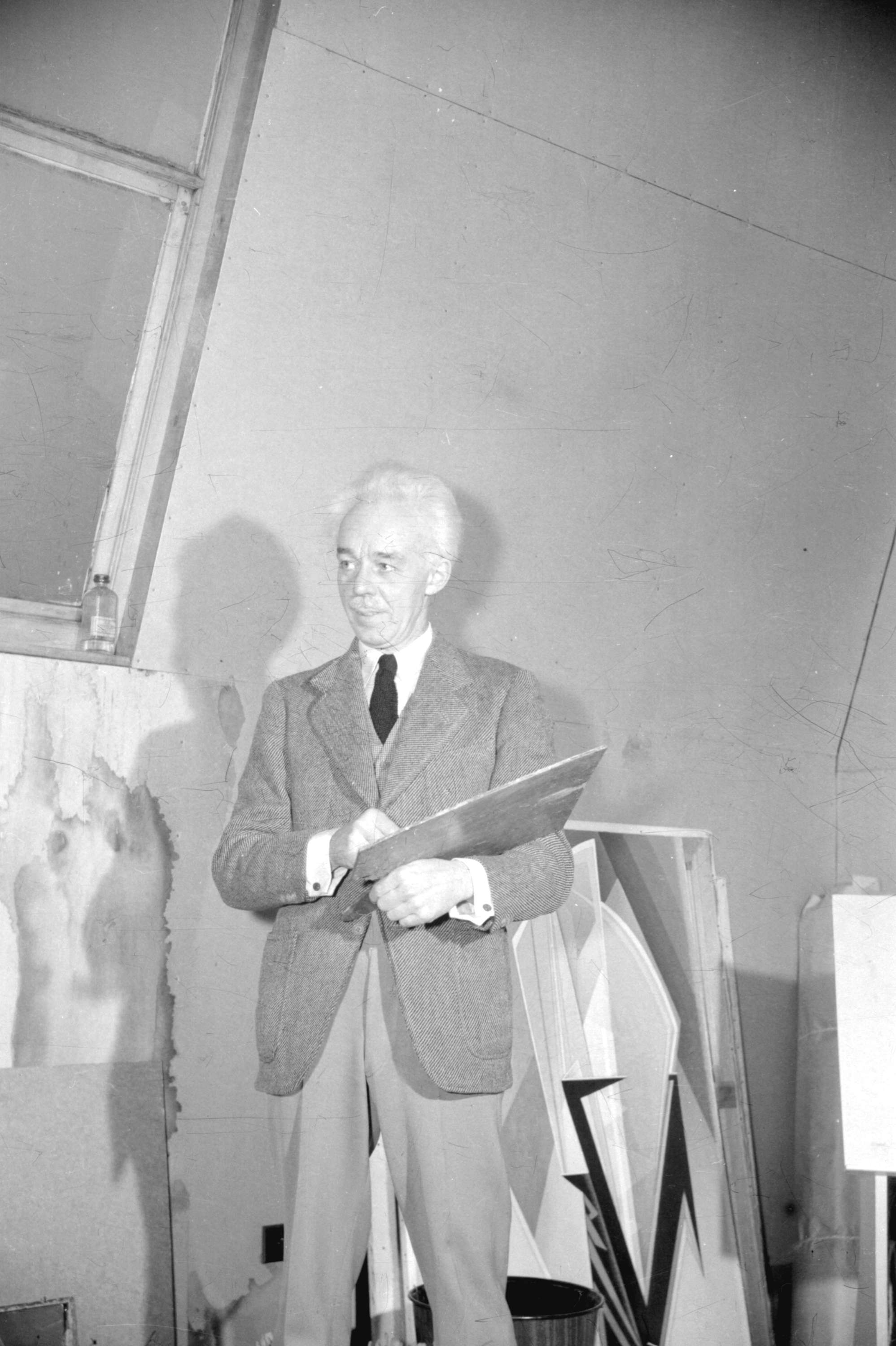
Lawren Harris in his Vancouver studio, circa 1944.

In Toronto, to which he returned in 1908, Harris found friends through the Arts and Letters Club of Toronto which he joined in 1909, making friends with journalist Roy Mitchell, another early member. In 1910, he became interested in philosophy and Eastern thought, likely through Mitchell, and began discussing Theosophy seriously (although it was not until 1924 that he formally joined the Toronto Lodge of the International Theosophical Society). From 1910 to 1918, he focused in his painting on the urban landscape of Toronto, featuring a significantly brightened palette, an attention to light, and a layered development of space in order to convey a sense of place. In 1911, he met and became friends with J. E. H. MacDonald who was exhibiting sketches in the clubroom of the Club. Harris and MacDonald went on sketching trips and together visited the exhibition of contemporary Scandinavian art in Buffalo at the Albright Gallery (today, the Buffalo AKG Art Museum) in 1913. Seeing it, they realized that they too could create a landscape art that was distinctly Canadian and modern.

In 1913, Harris took the first step that would cement a group of like minded artists together in Canadian art, by inviting A. Y. Jackson, then in Montreal, to Toronto. The following year, he and his friend Dr. James MacCallum, financed the construction of a Studio Building in Toronto which provided artists, among them Tom Thomson, with an inexpensive space to work. In 1915, Harris fixed up a shack behind the Studio Building for Thomson whose art and dedication to his career proved inspirational for Harris.

In March 1916, Harris enlisted in the Canadian Army for service in the First World War. He was appointed a Lieutenant attached to the 10th Royal Grenadiers and served as a Musketry Instructional Officer at Camp Borden until May 1918 when he was medically discharged, suffering a nervous breakdown.

== Boxcar trips ==
In 1918 and 1919, Harris financed boxcar trips for the artists of the later Group of Seven to the Algoma region, traveling along the Algoma Central Railway and painting in areas such as the Montreal River and Agawa Canyon. His work showed the effect of such trips: he began sketching in oil en plein air as a regular practice and used the sketches as a guide in constructing his major canvases.

== Formation of the group in 1920 ==
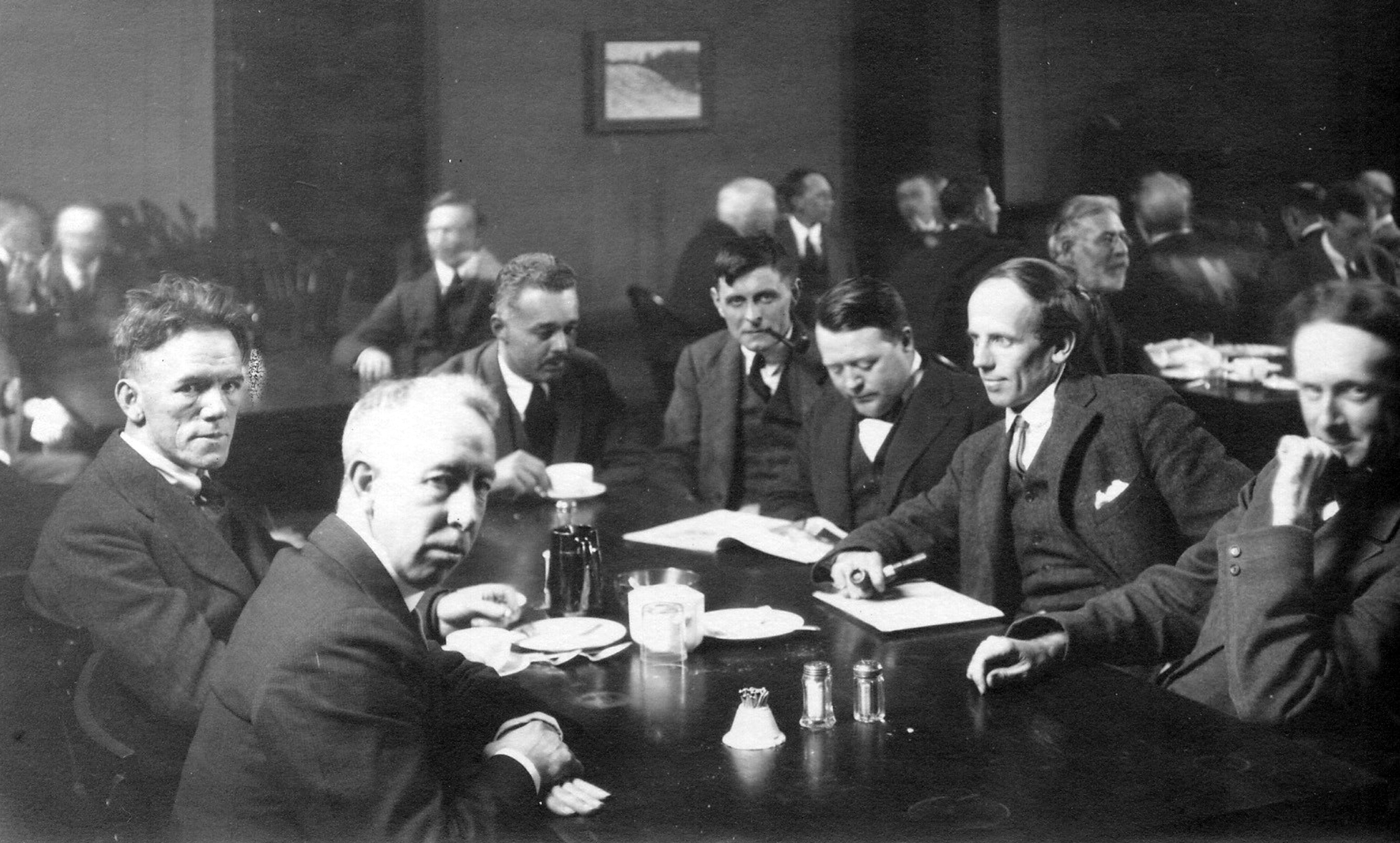
Group of seven artists: Frederick Varley, A. Y. Jackson, Lawren Harris, Barker Fairley, Frank Johnston (artist), Arthur Lismer, and J. E. H. MacDonald

In May 1920, Harris, J. E. H. MacDonald, and Franklin Carmichael, A. Y. Jackson, Frank Johnston, Arthur Lismer, and Frederick Varley, formed the Group of Seven.

== Lake Superior ==
In the fall of 1921, Harris in the company of Jackson ventured beyond Algoma to Lake Superior's North Shore, where he would return annually for the next seven years. They took the Algoma Central Railway north to Franz, where they caught the Canadian Pacific train travelling west.

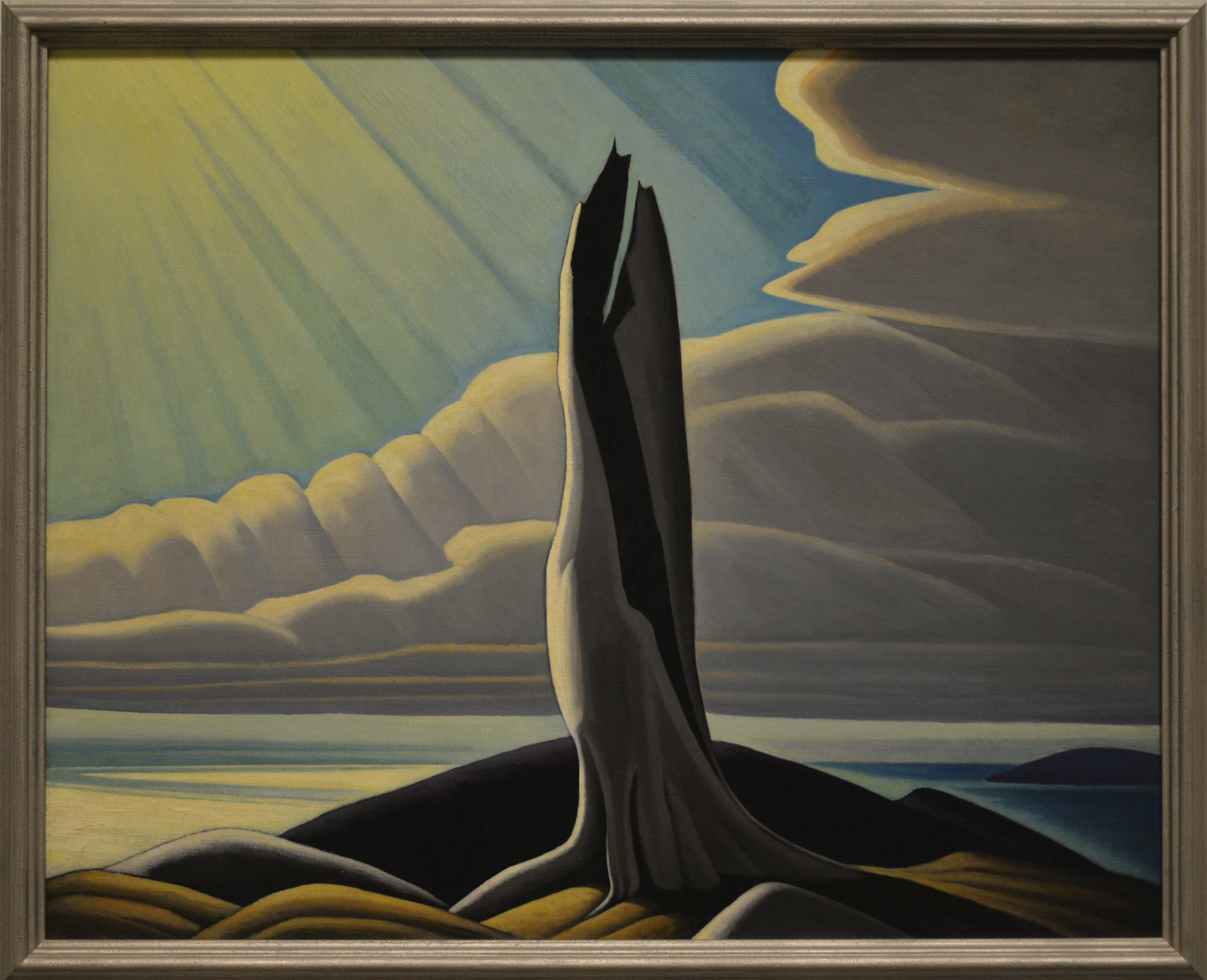
North Shore, Lake Superior, by Lawren Harris,1926

Harris would return to paint and draw on the north shore of Lake Superior almost every October until 1928. While his urban and Algoma paintings of the late 1910s and early 1920s were characterized by rich, bright colours and decorative compositional motifs, the discovery of Lake Superior as a source of subject material meant the depiction of features of the landscape in light over a vast body of water to compose a "sublime order", as described by Jackson. Harris conveyed the spiritual side to the scene through a more austere, stylized style, with a limited palette.

== Rocky Mountain ==
In 1924, a sketching trip with Jackson to Jasper National Park in the Canadian Rockies marked the beginning of Harris' mountain subjects, which he continued to explore with annual sketching trips until 1929, exploring areas around Banff National Park, Yoho National Park and Mount Robson Provincial Park.

== Greenland ==
In 1930, Harris went on his last extended sketching trip, travelling to Greenland, the Canadian Arctic and Labrador aboard the Royal Canadian Mounted Police supply ship and ice breaker, the SS. Beothic, for two months, during which time he completed over 50 sketches. The resulting Arctic canvases that he developed from the oil panels marked the end of his landscape period.

== Modernism and Harris ==
Harris's artistic career was one of constant exploration. He was the only member of the Group of Seven to align himself with European and American forms of Modernism. He always had been deeply interested in developments in modern art. In 1926, he represented Canada in the International Exhibition of Modern Art organized by the Société Anonyme (of which he was a member) and shown at the Brooklyn Museum in New York: he helped bring the show to Toronto in 1927. In ly on his desire to express ideas of the spirit, partly on his earlier landscapes of Lake Superior, the Rocky Mountains and the Arctic. In these years, he moved to Hanover, New Hampshire in 1934, then Santa Fe, New Mexico in 1938 and finally, Vancouver in 1940. After a period of experimentation, from 1936 on, Harris enthusiastically embraced abstract painting.

When asked in 1937 by Emily Carr to describe his recent work, Harris wrote:

Well, they are all different and yet alike—some more abstract than others—some verging on the representational—one never knows where the specific work in hand will lead. I try always to keep away from the representational however—for it seems the further I can keep away and into abstract idiom the more expressive the things become—yet one has in mind and heart the informing spirit of great Nature.

In time, he left all reference to landscape behind, and his work underwent changes towards a more organic form. He wrote about the path an abstract artist took from representation to abstraction to become fully abstract in an Essay on Abstract Painting published in 1949. In the 1950s, he painted his version of abstract expressionism. In 1954, in a separate publication that developed from his earlier essay on abstraction, he praised abstraction, writing:

...(in abstract art), we have a creative adventure in harmony with the highest aspiration and search for truth, beauty and expressive evocation and communication in our own day".

== Memberships in art organizations ==
In May 1920, Harris, J. E. H. MacDonald, and Franklin Carmichael, A. Y. Jackson, Frank Johnston, Arthur Lismer, and Frederick Varley, formed the Group of Seven. After disbanding of the Group of Seven in 1933, Harris and the other surviving members, were instrumental in forming its successor the Canadian Group of Painters. Harris served as its first president. In 1938, he helped organize the Transcendental Group of Painters in the United States. In 1941, he was a founder of the Federation of Canadian Artists, founded in Toronto and President (1944–1947).

== Honours ==
In 1926, his work won a gold medal at Sesquicentennial International Exposition of Philadelphia. In 1931, he won the Baltimore Museum of Art prize in the first Baltimore Pan-American Exhibition of Contemporary Paintings. In 1946, Harris was awarded an honorary degree from the University of British Columbia. He received an L.L.D. from the University of Toronto in 1951. In 1953, he received an L.L. D. from the University of Manitoba, Winnipeg. In 1961, he received the Canada Council medal for 1961. In 1969, he was given a Medal from the Royal Canadian Academy of Arts. In 1970, he was made a Companion of the Order of Canada, conferred posthumously.

Harris has been designated as an Historic Person in the Directory of Federal Heritage Designations.

== Personal life ==
On January 20, 1910, Harris married Beatrice (Trixie) Phillips. The couple had three children: Lawren P. Harris, Margaret Anne Harris, and Howard K. Harris, all born in the first decade of their marriage. Harris later fell in love with Bess, the wife of his school-time friend, F.B. Housser, but divorce was seen at the time as causing an outrage, particularly for a man as socially prominent as Harris.

Harris eventually left his wife of 24 years, Trixie, and married Bess Housser in 1934. He was threatened with charges of bigamy by Trixie’s family because of his actions. Later that year he and Bess left their home and moved to the United States. In 1940, they moved to Vancouver, British Columbia. Bess died in 1969. Harris died in Vancouver in 1970. His ashes and those of Bess are buried on the grounds of the McMichael Canadian Art Collection, Kleinburg.

== Legacy ==
In Toronto, a park in Rosedale at 145 Rosedale Valley Road was named for him. A solo exhibition of Lawren Harris was shown in the United States at the Americas Society Art Gallery in New York. In 2015, a travelling exhibition of Harris’ work, The Idea of North: The Paintings of Lawren Harris, curated by Steve Martin, opened at the Hammer Museum in Los Angeles, California. In 2016, a film about Harris's life, Where the Universe Sings, was produced by TV Ontario. It was created by filmmaker Peter Raymont and directed by Nancy Lang. In 2017, guest curators Roald Nasgaard and Gwendolyn Owens, organized an exhibition titled Higher States: Lawren S. Harris and his North American Contemporaries, comprising some seventy paintings at the McMichael Canadian Art Collection. It featured works by Canadian and American contemporaries of Harris' such as Bertram Brooker, Emily Carr, Lionel LeMoine FitzGerald, Arthur Dove, Georgia O'Keeffe, Raymond Jonson, Emil Bisttram and Marsden Hartley.

== Record sale prices ==
In 1981, South Shore, Baffin Island was sold for $240,000, a record price for a Canadian painting. On May 29, 2001, Harris's Baffin Island painting was sold for a record of $2.2 million (record up to that time). Before the auction, experts predicted the painting done by one of the original Group of Seven would top $1 million, but no one expected it to fetch more than twice that amount. The painting, which has always been in private hands, depicts icy white mountains with a dramatic blue sky. In 2005, Harris's painting, Algoma Hill, was sold at a Sotheby's auction for $1.38 million. It had been stored in a backroom closet of a Toronto hospital for years and was almost forgotten about until cleaning staff found it.

On May 23, 2007, Pine Tree and Red House, Winter, City Painting II by Harris came up for auction by Heffel Gallery in Vancouver, BC. The painting was a stunning canvas from 1924 that was estimated to sell between $800,000 and $1,200,000. The painting sold for a record-breaking $2,875,000 (premium included). On November 24, 2008, Harris's Nerke, Greenland painting sold at a Toronto auction for $2 million (four times the pre-sale estimate).

On November 26, 2009, Harris's oil sketch, The Old Stump, sold for $3.51 million at an auction in Toronto. In May 2010, Harris's painting, Bylot Island I, sold for $2.8 million at a Heffel Gallery auction in Vancouver, British Columbia. On November 26, 2015, his painting Mountain and Glacier was auctioned for $3.9 million at a Heffel Fine Art Auction House auction in Toronto, breaking the previous record for the sale of one of Harris's works. Another piece, Winter Landscape, sold for a hammer price of $3.1 million in the same auction. On November 23, 2016, Mountain Forms, estimated at $3–5 million, sold for $11.2 million at the Heffel Auction, the present high.

Harris' abstractions have become more popular with time. At the Heffel Auction Spring 2025, lot 108, The Turning Earth, oil on board, circa 1950, 12 x 15 in, 30.5 x 38.1 cm, estimate: $25,000 - $35,000 CAD, sold for $313,250 (including buyer's premium).

== See also ==
- The Studio Building
- Miners' Houses, Glace Bay, 1925 painting by Harris
- The Indian Church (1929 painting, renamed Church at Yuquot Village in 2018 by the Art Gallery of Ontario)
- Alexandra Biriukova, the architect who designed Harris's residence located at 2 Ava Crescent in Forest Hill, begun in 1931

== Bibliography ==
=== Primary sources ===
- Harris, Lawren (1922). Contrasts: A Book of Verse. Toronto: McClelland & Stewart.
- ——— (July 1926). "The Revelation of Art in Canada". Canadian Theosophist. 7: 85–88.
- ——— (May 1927). "Modern Art and Aesthetic Reactions: An Appreciation". Canadian Forum. 7: 239–41.
- ——— (1929). "Creative Art and Canada". In Brooker, Bertram (ed.). Yearbook of the Arts in Canada, 1928-29. Toronto: Macmillan. pp. 177–86.
- ——— (15 July 1933). "Theosophy and Art". Canadian Theosophist. 14 (5): 129–32.
- ——— (15 Aug 1933). "Theosophy and Art". Canadian Theosophist. 14 (6): 161–6.
- ——— (Dec 1933). "Different Idioms in Creative Art". Canadian Comment. 2 (12): 5–6, 32.
- ——— (October 1943). "The Function of Art". Art Gallery Bulletin [Vancouver Art Gallery]. 2: 2–3.
- ——— (1948). "The Group of Seven in Canadian History". Canadian Historical Association: Report of the Annual Meeting held at Victoria and Vancouver, 16-19 June 1948. Toronto: University of Toronto Press. pp. 28–38.
- ——— (Jan 1949). "An Essay on Abstract Painting". Royal Architectural Institute of Canada Journal. 26 (1): 3–8.
- ——— (1954). Abstract Painting: A Disquisition. Toronto: Rous and Mann Press.
- ——— (1964). The Story of the Group of Seven. Toronto: Rous and Mann Press., reproduced in Murray, Joan; Harris, Lawren (1993), The Best of the Group of Seven, McClelland & Stewart, ISBN 0-7710-6674-0
- Harris, Lawren (Summer 1987). "Lawren Harris's Fallacies About Art". Canadian Literature (113–114): 129–143.

=== Secondary sources ===
- Adamson, Jeremy (2008). "Lawren Harris: Towards an Art of the Spiritual". The Thomson Collection at the Art Gallery of Ontario. Toronto: Skylet. pp. 67–87.
- Bell, Andrew (Christmas 1948). "Lawren Harris: A Retrospective Exhibition of His Painting, 1910-1948". Canadian Art. 6 (2): 50–3.
- Boyanoski, Christine (1989). "Charles Comfort's Lake Superior Village and the Great Lakes Exhibition". Journal of Canadian Art History. 12 (2): 174–98.
- Carr, Angela K. (1998). "Portrait of Dr. Salem Bland: Another Spiritual Journey for Lawren S. Harris?". Journal of Canadian Art History. 19 (2): 6–27.
- Christensen, Lisa (2000). A Hiker's Guide to the Rocky Mountain Art of Lawren Harris. Calgary: Fifth House.
- Duncan, Norman (1909). Going Down from Jerusalem: The Narrative of a Sentimental Traveller. New York and London: Harper and Brothers.
- Duval, Paul (2011). Where the Universe Sings. Toronto: Cerebrus.
- Fairley, Barker (June 1921). "Some Canadian Painters: Lawren Harris". Canadian Forum. 1: 275–78.
- Foss, Brian (1999). ""Snychronism" in Canada: Lawren Harris, Decorative Landscape, and Willard Huntington Wright, 1916-1917". Journal of Canadian Art History. 20 (1/2): 68–91.
- Frye, Northrop (Christmas 1948). "The Pursuit of Form". Canadian Art. 6 (2): 54–7.
- Harris, Bess; Colgrove, R. G. P., eds. (1969). Lawren Harris. Toronto: Macmillan of Canada.
- King, James (2012). Inward Journey: The Life of Lawren Harris. Toronto: Thomas Allen.
- Larisey, Peter (1982). The Landscape Painting of Lawren Stewart Harris (Ph.D. thesis). Columbia University.
- ——— (1993). Light for a Cold Land: Lawren Harris's Work and Life; An Interpretation. Toronto: Dundurn.
- ——— (1974). "Nationalist Aspects of Lawren S. Harris's Aesthetics". National Gallery of Canada Bulletin/Galerie National du Canada Bulletin. 23: 3–9.
- ——— (1974). "A Portfolio of Landscapes by Lawren S. Harris/Carton de paysages de Lawren S. Harris". National Gallery of Canada Bulletin/Galerie National du Canada Bulletin. 23: 10–16.
- Lauder, Brian (Summer 1976). "Two Radicals: Richard Maurice Bucke and Lawren Harris". Dalhousie Review. 56 (2): 307–18.
- Linsley, Robert (1996). "Landscapes in Motion: Lawren Harris and the Heterogeneous Modern Nation". Oxford Art Journal. 19 (1): 80–95. doi:10.1093/oxartj/19.1.80.
- Mandel, Eli (Oct–Nov 1978). "The Inward, Northward Journey of Lawren Harris". Artscanada. 35 (3): 17–24.
- Mergen, Bernard (1997). The Modern Minds of Winter. Washington, DC: Smithsonian Institution Press. pp. 207–46.
- Murray, Joan (2003). Lawren Harris: An Introduction to his Life and Art. Toronto: Firefly Books. p. 9. Archived from the original on 2021-04-26.
- Murray, Joan (1994b). Northern lights: masterpieces of Tom Thomson and the Group of Seven. Toronto: Key Porter.
- Murray, Joan (1994a). Origins of Abstraction in Canada: Modernist Pioneers. Oshawa: Robert McLaughlin Gallery.
- Murray, Joan (Summer 1987). "The Literary Lawren Harris: Introduction to Lawren Harris's Fallacies About Art". Canadian Literature (113–114): 129–143.
- Murray, Joan; Fulford, Robert (1982). The Beginning of Vision: The Drawings of Lawren S. Harris. Toronto: Douglas & McIntyre in association with Mira Godard Editions.
- Nasgaard, Roald; Owens, Gwendolyn (2017). Higher States: Lawren S. Harris and his North American Contemporaries. Fredericton, New Brunswick and Kleinburg, Ontario: Goose Lane Editions and McMichael Canadian Art Collection.
- Plaff, L.R. (1978). "Portraits by Lawren Harris: Salem Bland and Others". RACAR: Revue d'art canadienne / Canadian Art Review. 5 (1): 21–7. doi:10.7202/1077314ar.
- Reid, Dennis (Dec 1968). "Lawren Harris". Artscanada. 25 (5): 9–16.
- Robins, John (Apr–May 1944). "Lawren Harris". Canadian Review of Music and Other Arts. 2 (3/4): 13–14.
- Smith, Sydney (Feb–Mar 1942). "The Recent Abstract Work of Lawren Harris". Maritime Art. 2 (3): 79–81.
- Street, Linda Marjorie (1980). Emily Carr: Lawren Harris and Theosophy, 1927-1933 (Dissertation). Ottawa: Carleton University.
- Trainor, James (Feb 2001). "Facing North". Border Crossings. 20 (1): 61–3.
- "What B.C. Means to Nine of Its Best Artists". Maclean's. Vol. 71, no. 10. 10 May 1958. pp. 27–33.

=== Exhibition catalogues ===
- Adamson, Jeremy (1978). Lawren S. Harris: Urban Scenes and Wilderness Landscapes, 1906-1930. Toronto: Art Gallery of Ontario. (Chronology by Peter Larisey)
- Hunter, Andrew (2000). Lawren Stewart Harris: A Painter's Progress. New York: Americas Society. ISBN 9781879128217.
- Jackson, Christopher (1991). Lawren Harris: North by West; The Arctic and Rocky Mountain Paintings of Lawren Harris, 1924-1931/Lawren Harris: le Grand Nord via l'Ouest: les tableaux de l'Arctique et des Rocheuses peints par Lawren Harris de 1924 à 1931. Calgary: Glenbow Museum.
- Lawren Harris, Paintings, 1910-1948. Toronto: Art Gallery of Toronto. 1948.
- Lawren Harris Retrospective Exhibition 1963. Ottawa: National Gallery of Canada. 1963.
- Lawren P. Harris, 37/72. Halifax: Dalhousie Art Gallery, Halifax. 1972.
- Martin, Steve; Burlingham, Cynthia; Hunter, Andrew; Quinn, Karen (2015). The Idea of North: The Paintings of Lawren Harris. Toronto: Art Gallery of Ontario. ISBN 978-3791354705.
- Reid, Dennis (1985). Atma Buddhi Manas: The Later Work of Lawren S. Harris. Toronto: Art Gallery of Ontario.

=== Group of Seven and Canadian art ===
- Boulet, Roger (1982), The Canadian Earth, M. Bernard Loates, Cerebrus Publishing, ISBN 0920016103
- Cole, Douglas (Summer 1978). "Artists, Patrons and Public: An Inquiry into the Success of the Group of Seven". Journal of Canadian Studies. 13 (2): 69–78. doi:10.3138/jcs.13.2.69. S2CID 152198969.
- Colgate, William (1943). Canadian Art: Its Origin and Development. Toronto: Ryerson Press.
- Davis, Ann (1992). The Logic of Ecstasy: Canadian Mystical Painting, 1920-1940. Toronto: University of Toronto Press.
- Dawn, Leslie (2006). National Visions, National Blindness: Canadian Art and Identities in the 1920s. Vancouver: UBC Press.
- Dejardin, Ian, ed. (2011). Painting Canada: Tom Thomson and the Group of Seven. London: Dulwich Picture Gallery.
- Duvall, Paul (1972). Four Decades: The Canadian Group of Painters and Their Contemporaries, 1930-1970. Toronto: Clarke Irwin.
- Grace, Sherrill E. (2004). Canada and the Idea of North. Montreal: McGill-Queen's University Press.
- Harper, J. Russell (1966). Painting in Canada: A History. Toronto: University of Toronto Press.
- Hill, Charles C. (1995). The Group of Seven: Art for a Nation. Ottawa: National Gallery of Canada.
- Housser, F. B. (1926). A Canadian Art Movement: The Story of the Group of Seven. Toronto: Macmillan.
- Hubbard, R.H. (1963). The Development of Canadian Art. Ottawa: National Gallery of Canada.
- Jackson, A.Y. (1958). A Painter's Country. Toronto: Clarke Irwin.
- King, Ross (2010). Defiant Spirits: The Modernist Revolution of the Group of Seven. D & M Publishers. ISBN 978-1553658078.
- MacDonald, Thoreau (1944). The Group of Seven. Toronto: Ryerson Press.
- MacTavish, Newton (1925). The Fine Arts in Canada. Toronto: Macmillan.
- McInnis, Graham C. (1950). Canadian Art. Toronto: Macmillan.
- McKay, Marylin J. (2011). Picturing the Land: Narrating Territories in Canadian Landscape Art, 1500-1950. Montreal: McGill-Queen's University Press.
- Mellen, Peter (1970). The Group of Seven. Toronto: McClelland and Stewart. ISBN 9780771058158.
- Murray, Joan (1994). Northern lights: masterpieces of Tom Thomson and the Group of Seven. Toronto: Key Porter.
- Murray, Joan (1993), The Best of the Group of Seven, McClelland & Stewart, ISBN 0-7710-6674-0
- O'Brian, John; White, Peter, eds. (2007). Beyond Wilderness: The Group of Seven, Canadian Identity, and Contemporary Art. Montreal: McGill-Queen's University Press.
- Orford, Emily-Jane Hills (2008). The Creative Spirit: Stories of 20th Century Artists. Ottawa: Baico Publishing. ISBN 978-1-897449-18-9.
- Reid, Dennis (1970). The Group of Seven. Ottawa: The National Gallery of Canada.
- Robson, Albert H. (1932). Canadian Landscape Painters. Toronto: Ryerson Press.
- Rosenblum, Robert (1975). Modern Painting and the Northern Romantic Tradition: Friedrich to Rothko. New York: Harper & Row.
- Silcox, David P. (2011). The Group of Seven and Tom Thomson. Richmond Hill: Firefly Books. ISBN 978-1554078851.
