= Miners' Houses, Glace Bay =

1925 painting by Lawren Harris

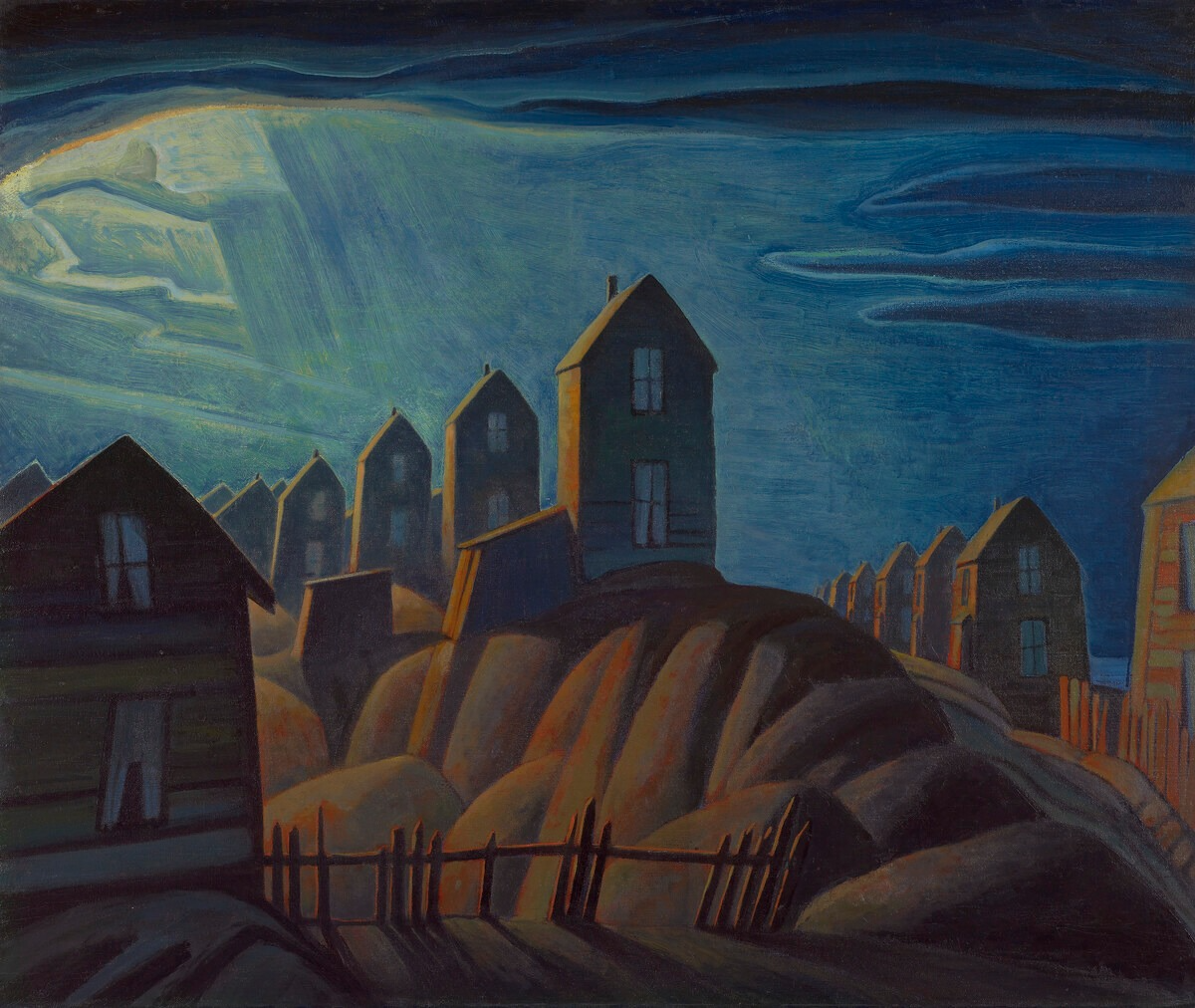
- Artist: Lawren Harris
- Year: c. 1925
- Medium: Oil on canvas
- Subject: Glace Bay, Nova Scotia
- Dimensions: 107.3 cm × 127 cm (42.25 in × 50 in)
- Location: Art Gallery of Ontario, Toronto

Miners' Houses, Glace Bay is a 1925 painting by Lawren Harris. The painting depicts the houses of working-class miners in Glace Bay, Nova Scotia, reflecting the struggles of the people of industrial Cape Breton. The painting is in the collection of the Art Gallery of Ontario.

== Description ==
Miners' Houses, Glace Bay depicts an urban industrial landscape, featuring the working-class housing of miners in the community of Glace Bay, Nova Scotia. There are no humans visible in the painting, and it has been variously described as "bleak" or "eerie". The painting is intended to reflect the struggles of the people of industrial Cape Breton.

== History ==
Lawren Harris was a Canadian painter best known as one of the founding members of the Group of Seven. In 1925, Harris was in Cape Breton, Nova Scotia reporting on ongoing labour disputes in the coal mining industry for the Toronto Star. Inspired by the ordeal, he started painting Miners' Houses, Glace Bay while still in Cape Breton. He finished the painting when he returned to his studio in Toronto. It was his final painting depicting an urban industrial setting before he moved on to painting northern landscapes.

The painting was featured on a postage stamp by Canada Post in 2020, as part of a set of seven stamps commemorating the centennial of the Group of Seven's first public exhibition.

The painting is in the collection of the Art Gallery of Ontario. In 2025, the gallery loaned the painting to the Eltuek Arts Centre in Sydney, where it was put on public exhibition.

== See also ==
- The Indian Church, a painting by Emily Carr purchased by Harris
