= Heffel Gallery =

Canadian auctioneers company (1879)

Heffel Fine Arts Auction Group Inc.
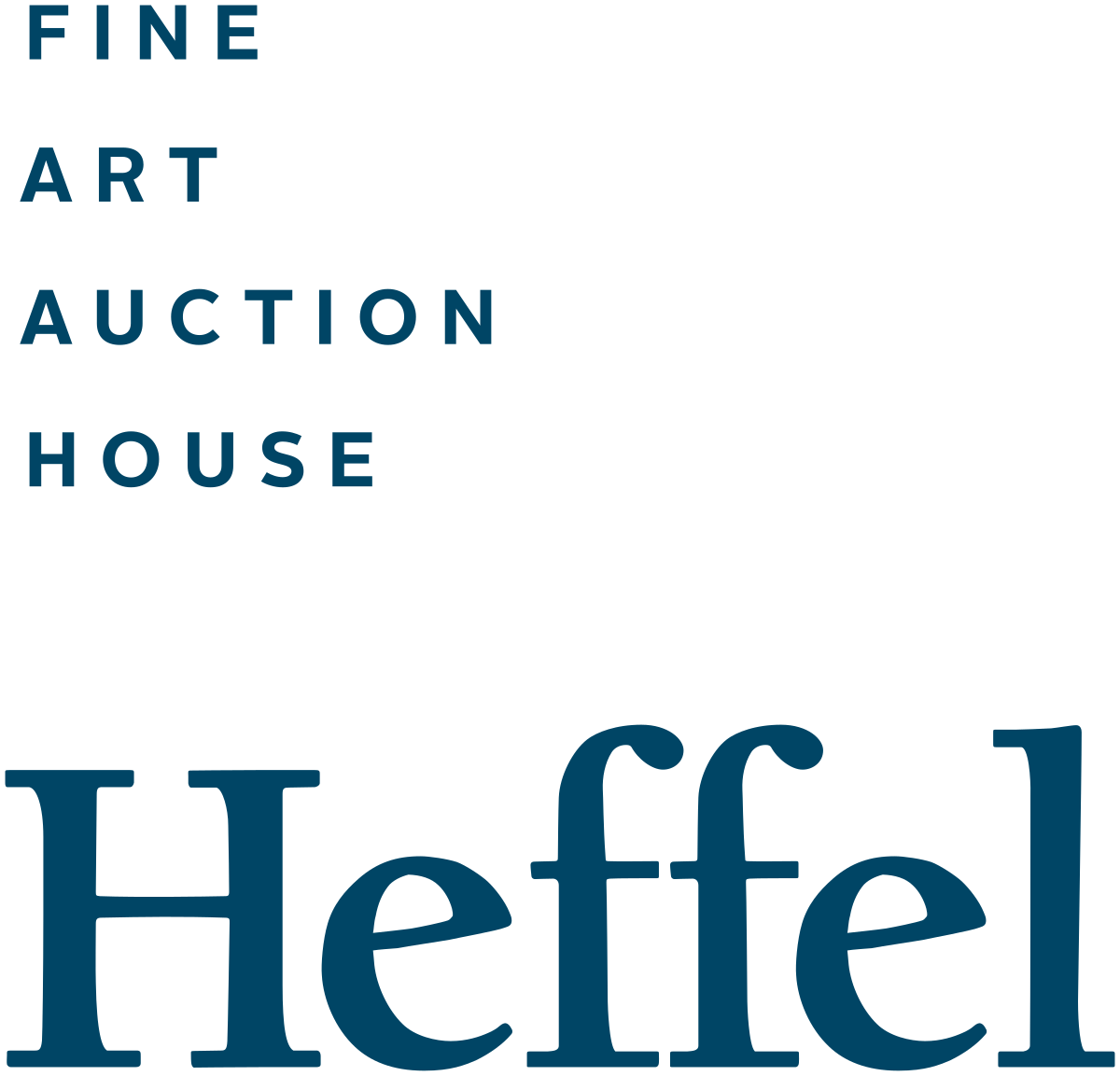
- Type: Public
- Industry: Art Auctions
- Founder: Kenneth G. Heffel
- Headquarters: Canada
- Number of locations: 4
- Key people: David Heffel and Robert Heffel (President & Vice President)
- Revenue: ▲ C$50 million (2025) (2025)
- Operating income: ▲ C$6,25 million (2024) (2025)
- Net income: C$2,5 millions $ (2025)
- Number of employees: 82 (2025)
- Website: www.heffel.com

Heffel Fine Art Auction House logo

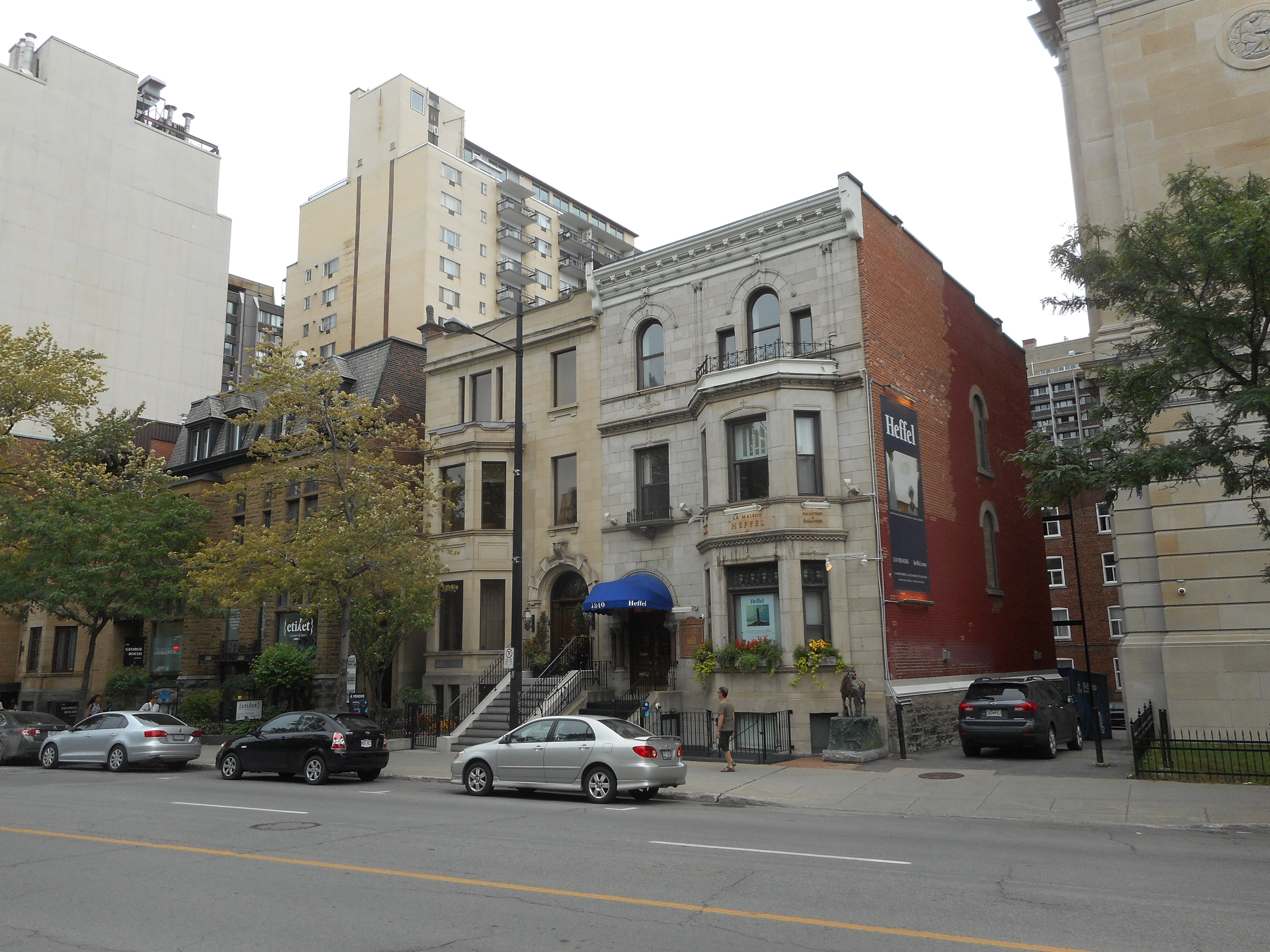
Heffel Gallery, 1840, Sherbrooke Street West, Montreal

Heffel Fine Art Auction House (or Heffel) is a division of Heffel Gallery Limited. Heffel maintains offices in Vancouver, Calgary, Toronto, Ottawa and Montreal.

== History ==
In 1978 art collector Kenneth Grant Heffel (1935–1987) established Kenneth G. Heffel Fine Art Inc. in the former Royal Bank of Canada building on South Granville Street in Vancouver. In 1980, the former industrialist purchased the Fannin Hall Collection of 145 works by Canada’s Group of Seven artists and their contemporaries for $6 million. In February, an exhibition of this collection established his reputation as a dealer of important Canadian art.

On his death in 1987, his sons David Heffel (born 1962) and Robert Heffel (born 1964), both educated in art history, took over the business. Renamed Heffel Gallery Limited, the company continued to show work by well-known Canadian artists such as Alex Colville, Guido Molinari, Emily Carr and Lawren Harris. In 1995, the two brothers established the division of Heffel Fine Art Auction House. The inaugural auction held in Vancouver was the first in Western Canada to record sales over $1 million.

Heffel was the first in Canada to adapt the traditional auction format to the Internet. In 1999, Heffel held its first online auction in September. In that same year, Heffel established the tradition of semi-annual live auctions and, in 2003, began to alternate between a spring auction held in Vancouver and a fall auction in Toronto. The auction house was also the first in Canada to broadcast sales live on the Internet using a multi-camera webcast.

In 2002, Heffel opened an Ottawa office and established Heffel Gallery in Toronto, at 13 Hazelton Avenue in Yorkville. In 2005, Heffel established Galerie Heffel in Montreal at 1840 Sherbrooke Street West and, in 2007, employed a Calgary representative. With offices across Canada, the company is described as a "globally significant, yet surprisingly local, institution."

The fall, 2004 live auction established Heffel as the leader in Canada’s fine art resale market. Since then Heffel has maintained an approximate 60% share of the market. In spring 2007, Heffel set the record for the highest grossing live auction of Canadian art. By June 2013, with more than $325 million in total art auction sales, Heffel had sold more Canadian art than any other auctioneer in the world.

Since about 2016, Heffel Fine Art's business model has shifted toward private and online sales.

== Auctions of note ==
- 2000-fall: War Canoes, Alert Bay by Emily Carr sold for $1,018,750 CDN, set a new record for the artist, and was the most valuable work sold at live auction in Canada in 2000.
- 2004-fall: Fishboats, Rivers Inlet by E. J. Hughes sold for $920,000 CDN, a new record for the artist. The total auction results of $8.5 million set a new record for a single-session live auction of Canadian art.
- 2006-fall: Il était une fois une ville by Jean-Paul Riopelle sold for $1,667,500 CDN, a new auction record for a Riopelle in Canada.
- 2007-spring: Pine Tree and Red House, Winter, City Painting II by Lawren Harris sold for $2,875,000 CDN, a new record for the artist. Spring Woods and Summer Clouds by Tom Thomson sold for over $1 million each also set a new record for the artist. The total sales of $22.8 million CDN set a record for the highest grossing live auction.
- 2009-spring: Wind in the Tree Tops by Emily Carr sold for a record $2,164,500 CDN.
- 2009-fall: The Old Stump, Lake Superior by Lawren Harris sold for a record $3,510,000 CDN.
- 2010-fall: Man on Verandah by Alex Colville sold for $1,287,000 CDN, the highest auction result for a living Canadian artist on record.
- 2011-fall: Nineteen Ten Remembered by Jean Paul Lemieux sold for $2.34 million CDN.
- 2013-spring: Composition by Jean-Paul Riopelle sold for $1.228 million CDN, while A Quebec Village (Winter, Saint-Fidèle) by A. Y. Jackson sold for $585,000 CDN. Total auction sales were $11.5 million CDN.
- 2015-fall: Mountain and Glacier by Lawren Harris sold for an artist's record $3.9 million CDN, while another Harris work Winter Landscape sold for a hammer price of $3.1 million CDN, Alex Colville's Harbour sold for $1.6 million CDN, and After the Storm by Tom Thomson, believed to be the artist's final completed painting, sold for $1.1 million CDN
