= Frank Johnston (artist) =

Canadian artist (1888–1949)

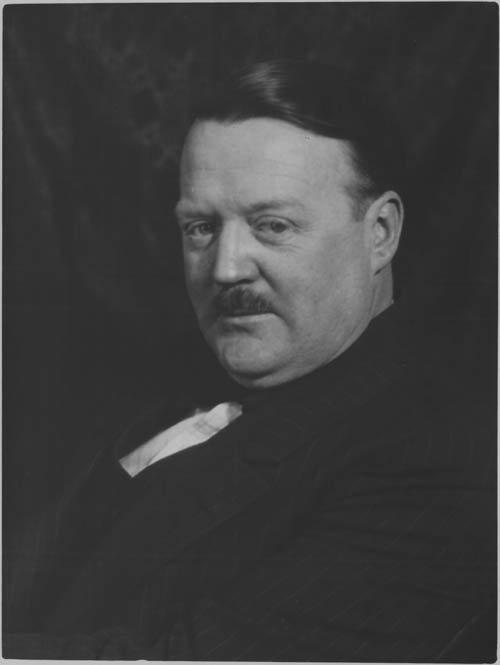
- Frank Johnston, 1930
- Born: Francis Hans Johnston; June 19, 1888; Toronto, Ontario
- Died: July 9, 1949 (aged 61); Toronto, Ontario
- Known for: painter

Francis Hans Johnston (also known as Frank H. Johnston and as Franz Johnston) (June 19, 1888 – July 9, 1949) was a member of the Group of Seven. He most commonly worked as a landscape painter though in a more conservative mode than other members of the Group. He also used tempera rather than oil paint in his Algoma landscapes, a fast-drying material that was more often associated with commercial art of his day.

== Life and career ==
Frank Johnston was born on June 19, 1888, in Toronto, the son of Hugh Hans and Mary Elizabeth (Roderick) Johnston. He was educated at Central Technical School in Toronto, studying with Gustav Hahn, and the Central Ontario School of Art with William Cruikshank and George Agnew Reid. In 1908, he joined Grip Ltd. as a commercial artist. In 1910, he left for the United States where he studied art in Philadelphia and worked in commercial design in New York. Upon his return to Toronto in 1915, he used his spare time from commercial art to pursue landscape painting, through sketching trips around Toronto. In 1918, he was commissioned by the Canadian War Memorials to record Canadian flying personnel training for overseas duty.

In 1916, encouraged by Dr. James MacCallum, he travelled to Hearst, Ontario, to paint. From 1918 on, he joined Lawren Harris and J.E.H. MacDonald on their journeys to Algoma. His paintings from those years express a strong decorative interpretation of the landscape, but he often employed fast-drying tempera rather than oil paint. Johnston's rate of production was such that in the 1919 Algoma show at the Art Gallery of Toronto he contributed sixty works - more than any other artist.

In 1920, he was invited to join the Group of Seven, but his association with it was brief. He did take part in the Group's first exhibition of 1920, but in the fall of 1920 he left Toronto to become Principal at the Winnipeg School of Art and taught at the city's art school. He asserted his independence even more, having a large solo show of 200 paintings at the T. Eaton Company Galleries in December 1920, of which the Mail and Empire said:

The position of Frank H. Johnston, A.R.C.A. among local artists is unique. Mr. Johnston is always classed as one of the much discussed 'Group of Seven,' but he has never got out of touch with the picture lovers who cannot quite get the viewpoint of his ultra-radical companions....He has the secret of the living, vivid colouring of the Northland, and catches the feeling of the wild spaces.

In January 1922, he held an exhibition at the Winnipeg Art Gallery that included 326 works. He claimed that he had no disagreement with the group, only that he wanted to go his own way with regard to exhibition.

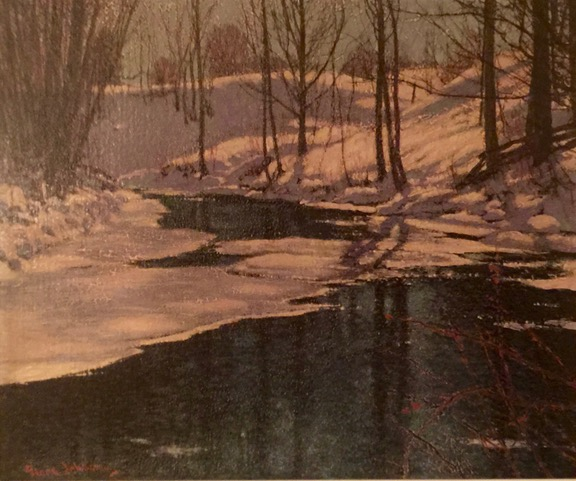
Pools of Sapphire Frank Johnston 1941

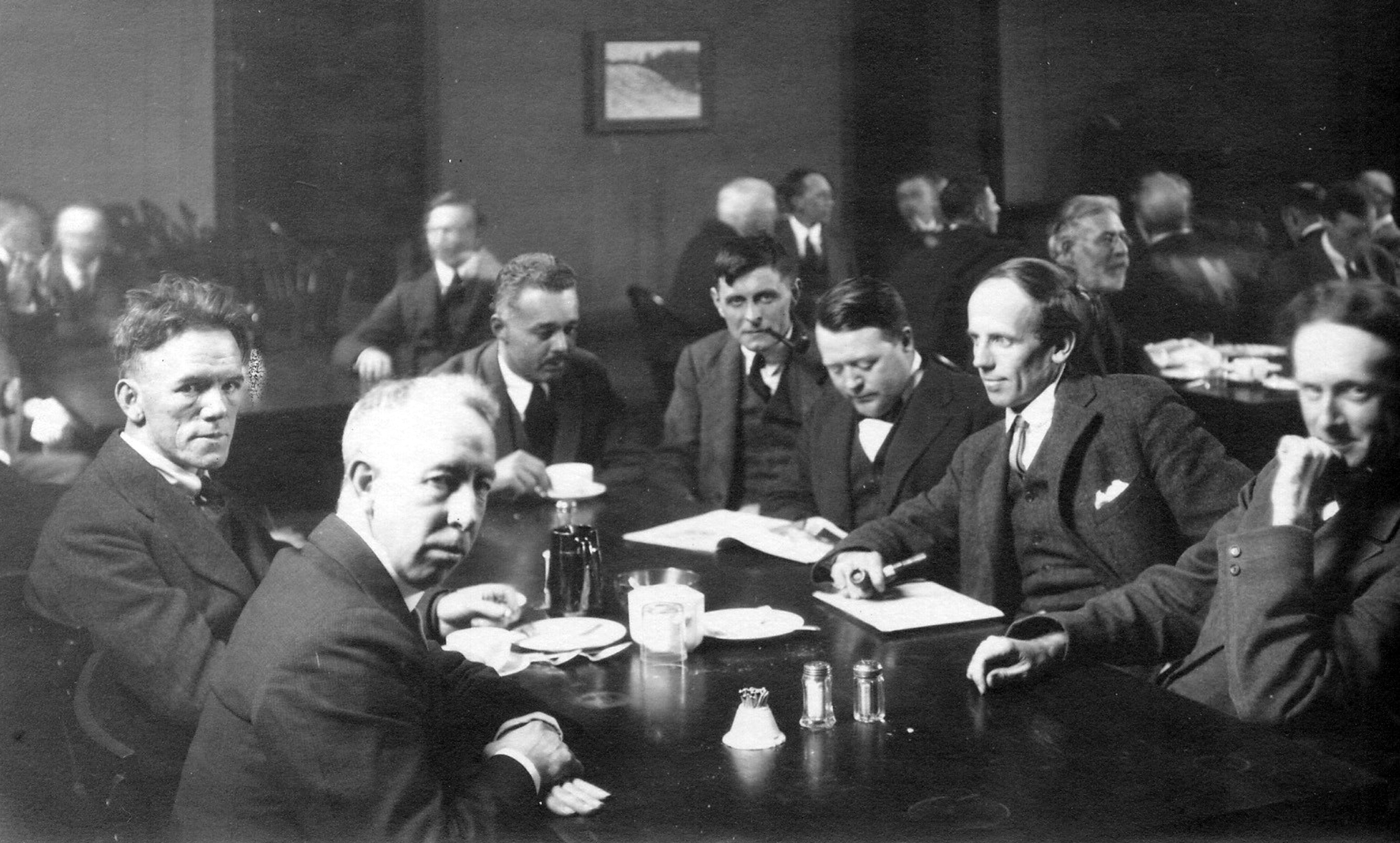
Group of seven artists: Frederick Varley, A. Y. Jackson, Lawren Harris, Fairley, Frank Johnston (artist), Arthur Lismer, and J. E. H. MacDonald

In 1925, Johnston changed his name to the more exotic first name of 'Franz' Johnston. By 1927, he was back in Toronto, working as the principal at the Ontario College of Art. In later years, the artist's work demonstrated a return to a more classical style of landscape painting and revealed a strong fascination with the qualities of light, especially light on snow. This theme recurred in later works, in large narrative paintings of the 1930s and 1940s as well as more intimate examinations of a river valley, the bright blue of the water contrasting with snow-laden banks. His subjects range from the pastoral countryside of the Wyebridge area, to northern Quebec, and the Northwest Territories. He had begun to hold regular solo exhibitions in the 1920s and his paintings found a great following among the public. Unlike many Canadian artists, Johnston was able to achieve considerable financial success in his own lifetime.

He was made an associate member of the Royal Canadian Academy of Arts. He was also a member of the Ontario Society of Artists. His work is in many public collections such as the National Gallery of Canada.

He died in Toronto in 1949 and buried with fellow members of the Group of Seven at the McMichael Canadian Art Collection museum grounds in Kleinburg, Ontario. In 1969, he was given a Medal by the Royal Canadian Academy of Arts for being a member of the Group of Seven.

Of his four children, two were artists: Frances-Anne Johnston and Paul Roderick. A retrospective of his work was organized at the Rothmans Art Gallery, Stratford (today called Gallery Stratford) in 1970.

== Record sale prices ==
At the Cowley Abbott Auction, Select Important Collections, May 30, 2024, Sun Song of Algoma (1920), tempera on paper board, 40 x 30 in ( 101.6 x 76.2 cm ), Auction Estimate: $70,000.00 – $90,000.00, realized a price of $168,000.00.
