= Alexandra Biriukova =

Canadian architect and nurse

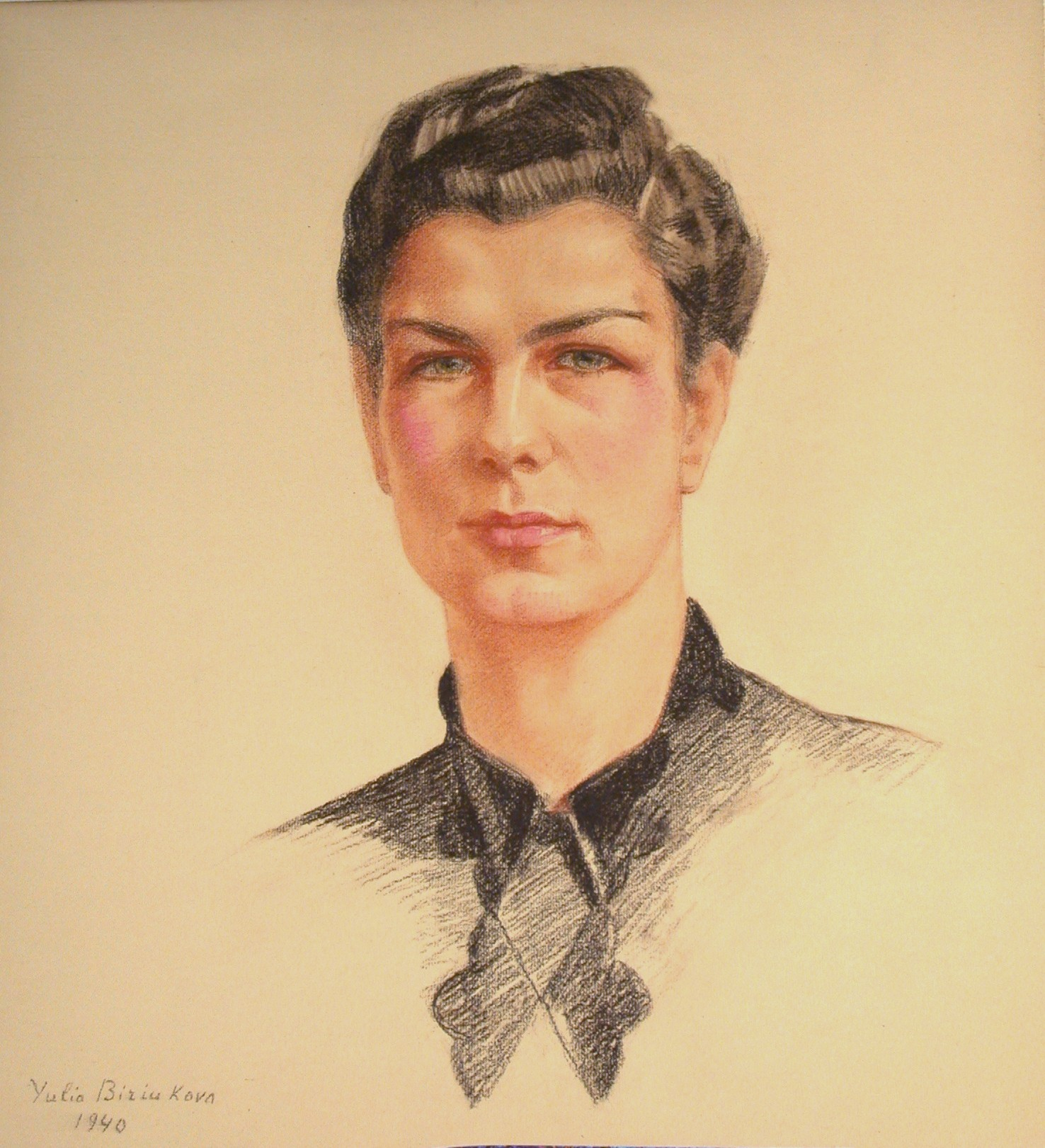
- Born: July 10, 1895; Vladivostok
- Died: February 10, 1967 (aged 71); Toronto
- Education: School of Architecture in Saint Petersburg
- Occupation: Architect
- Buildings: Lawren Harris residence

Alexandra Biriukova (July 10, 1895 – February 10, 1967) was a Canadian architect and nurse. She is known for being the first woman in the Ontario Association of Architects and for her design of Lawren Harris's residence. She was the second woman to register as an architect in Canada.

== Biography ==
Biriukova was born in Vladivostok, Russia. Her father was Dmitry Biriukoff (1864 Russian Empire-1928 Rome, Italy), Russian nobleman, who was the chief civil engineer on the Trans-Siberian Railway. Her mother Julia Biriukova (1867 Russian Empire-1925 Rome, Italy), maiden name Glass, was raised in the family of State Councillor Wladyslaw Wojciechowski (Vladislav Voicehovsky) in Sankt-Petersburg.

In 1911, Biriukova studied architecture and received a degree from the School of Architecture in Petrograd.

During the Russian Revolution, she and her family left the country and moved to Rome. In 1925, in Rome, she received a post-graduate degree in architecture from the Royal Superior School of Architecture. Between 1924 and 1929, she worked in Rome for architect Arnoldo Foschini. In 1929 she moved again to Toronto where her sister, Yulia Biriukova, an artist, lived. She registered with the Ontario Association of Architects (OAA) in 1931.

== Work ==
In Toronto, her first commission is believed to be an interior design for a Russian Orthodox Church. However, Biriukova's most recognized work is the Lawren Harris residence, which was designed in the Art Deco style and is one of the few homes to be built in Toronto along avant garde lines. Construction on the home, located at 2 Ava Crescent in Forest Hill, began in 1931. The house is symmetrical, smooth and made up of "almost austere two- and three-storey masses." While the designs for the house had initially been prepared by Douglas Kertland, she reworked the designs at Harris's request and she is credited for all of the final design work. Biriukova's design was considered "radical" for the time. At first, the Harris home received a negative critical reception from contemporaries. However, today, the building continues to be recognized: the OAA named it one of the top ten Art Deco Buildings in Toronto.

Biriukova has not been well recognized in art history due to architectural historians "who have tried to diminish the role she played in the design of Harris's well-known house." Even though she was named as architect on the contract drawings, some historians "have questioned how much credit Biriukova should receive for this elegant and iconic house." Geoffrey Simmins, an art historian from the University of Calgary, asserted, with little evidence, that Harris instead may have influenced most of the home's design, saying, "Certainly the house's geometric plan and clear, axial sequence of spaces...accord with Harris's own interests." Cynthia Hammond calls such readings of Biriukova's work "troubling narratives" which are loaded with gendered assumptions.

It seems likely that Biriukova, coming from Europe, would have already been aware of the "avant-garde, pre-revolution Russian architects and the modernist designs coming from the Bauhaus School," and her design reflected "the emerging early international style emanating from Europe. Harris had been to Europe prior to building his house and had "consciously sought European precedents for the design of his home."

After her work on Harris's house, she received no further commissions. Other architectural historians, like Ayla Lepine, have wondered if Modernism was "too much for conservative Canadians," or if the Depression dried up opportunities for architects, or if it was because she was a Russian woman. The Depression most likely created a "dearth of work."

== Later life and death ==
In 1934, Biriukova registered as a nurse and never practiced as an architect again. Instead, she worked at the Toronto Free Hospital for the Consumptive Poor until she retired in the 1960s. Biriukova died in Toronto in 1967.

== See also ==
- Nikolai Vladimirovich Voitsekhovsky (in Russian) – Alexandra Biriukova's half-brother
