= Fine Weather, Georgian Bay =

Painting by J.E.H. MacDonald

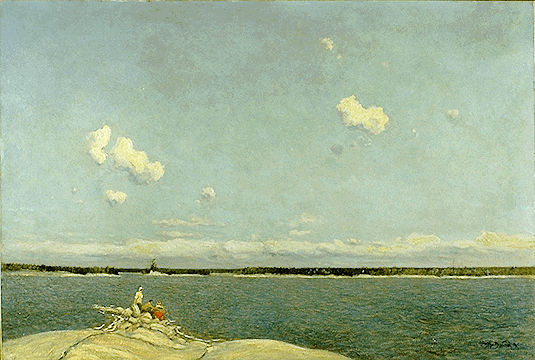
- Artist: J. E. H. MacDonald
- Year: 1913
- Medium: Oil on canvas
- Dimensions: 96.5 cm × 142.2 cm (38.0 in × 56.0 in)
- Location: Art Gallery of Ontario; Toronto

Fine Weather, Georgian Bay is a 1913 oil painting by J.E.H. MacDonald. It is in the collection of the Art Gallery of Ontario located in Toronto, Ontario, Canada.

== Description ==
Fine Weather, Georgian Bay is an oil painting by the Canadian painter J.E.H. MacDonald, a member of one of the most well known Canadian group of painters, the Group of Seven. The painting was first exhibited at the Ontario Society of Artists in 1913. The peaceful Sunday afternoon excursion painting was quite different from MacDonald's previous works of industry and machinery. The work is vast and full of light, an uninhabited, untouched landscape, the only intrusion being the two small figures—MacDonald's fellow Canadian painters A. Y. Jackson on the left and Tom Thomson on the right—tying up their canoe, silhouetted against the clear, still waters. The painting exudes an air of the easy life.

It is clear the emphasis of the composition is the sky, which covers more than three-quarters of the canvas. The low-lying cloud cover reflects the tree line below and the cumulus masses gently floating upwards draw the viewer's eye from the lower left to the upper right corner of the painting. The sky is reflected in the light, dancing across the calm waters. MacDonald has achieved this effect through strong strokes parallel to the distant shoreline. Even in this piece, with its muted colours and pastel tones, MacDonald shows his skilled command over colour. The water is composed of dark and light blues and greens, showing its varied depth and hinting at its crystal clarity, but MacDonald has also painted creamy pinks and soft purples reflecting the multi-coloured sky above. The small strip of beach in the foreground is also rich in colour, giving it life and movement.

=== Acquisition ===
This piece was part of the 2002 gift to the Art Gallery of Ontario from the businessman and art collector Kenneth Thomson, 2nd Baron Thomson of Fleet (no relation to the painting's subject Tom Thomson).

== See also ==
- Group of Seven
