= Albert Angus Turbayne =

American book designer and bookbinding artist

- Born: Albert Angus Turbayne; May 3, 1866; Boston, Massachusetts, United States
- Died: April 29, 1940 (aged 73–74); London, United Kingdom
- Occupations: book designer, illustrator
- Known for: book design

Albert Angus Turbayne (May 3, 1866 – April 29, 1940) was an American book designer and bookbinding artist.

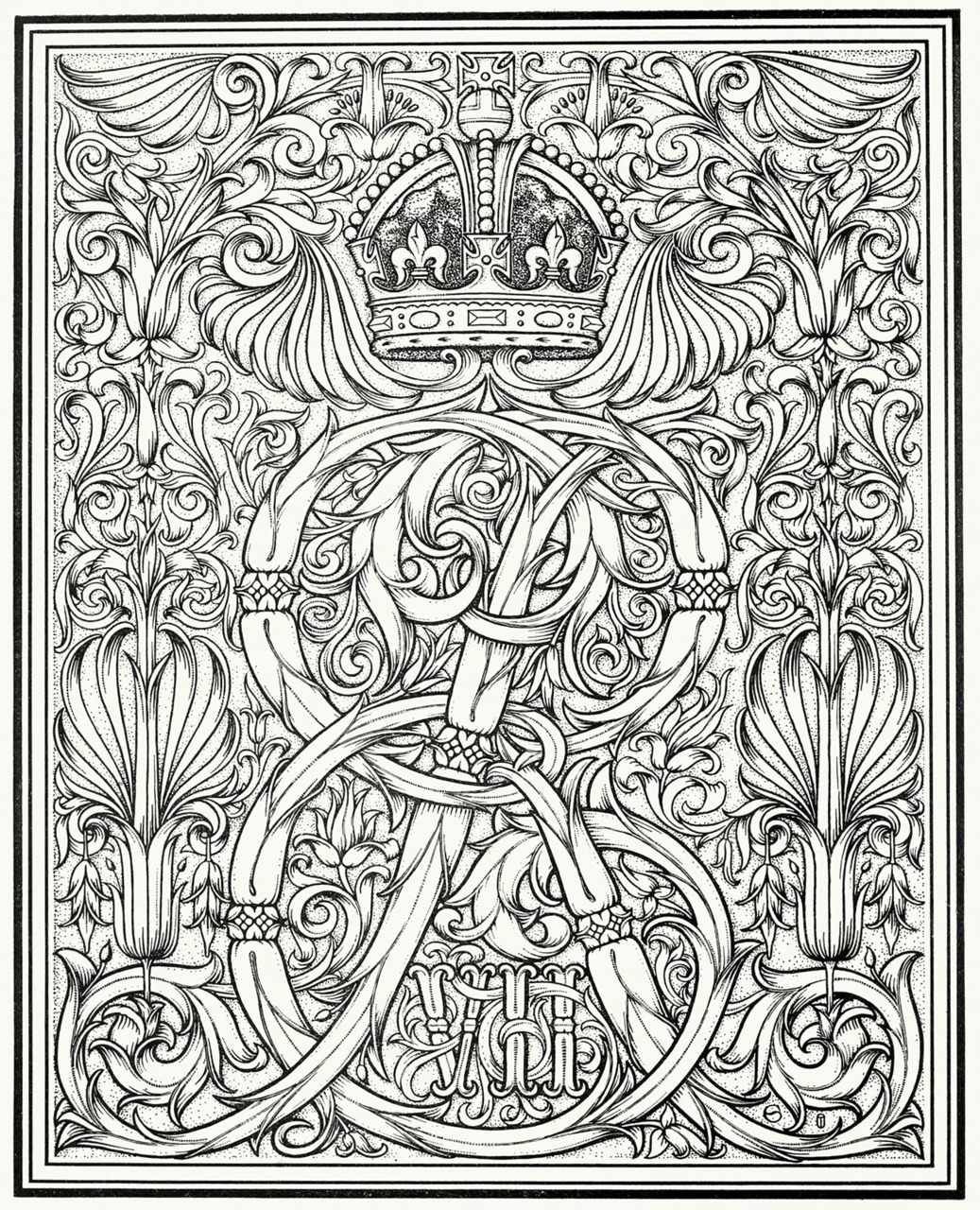
An example of Turbayne's work

Turbayne was born in Boston, Massachusetts. He worked in London for the London County Council School of Photoengraving and Lithography and also for Carlton Studio. Whilst at Carlton, he worked closely with fellow North American émigrés William Tracy Wallace and Norman Mills Price. His principal artistic work was the design of books and bindings. He won a bronze medal (third place) for book binding design at the Exposition Universelle (1900) in Paris.

Turbayne married in London on two occasions. The first in 1906, to Christine Owens and the second, to Millicent Tavener (b. 1884), in 1921. Turbayne and Owens had two sons, William Turbayne (later name change to William Seymour) and John Turbayne, born in 1914, who changed his name to John Seymour.

Turbayne died in London in 1940.

== Works ==
- Turbayne, Albert Angus (1906). Monograms and Ciphers. Library of Alexandria. ISBN 978-1-4655-4359-2.
