= Norman Mills Price =

Canadian American illustrator

Norman Mills Price (1877–1951) was a Canadian American illustrator known for his work in historical subjects.

Born in Brampton, Ontario, Canada, he studied at the Ontario School of Art, then in London at the Westminster School of Art and the Goldsmith’s Institute. After founding Carlton Studios with William Tracy Wallace, Price left London to study at the Académie Julian in Paris.

By 1912 Price had moved to the United States, where he worked as an illustrator in New York City. His art was characterized by detailed documentary research that served the dramatic qualities of his subjects. Price worked in color and black-and-white and was recognized for his richly textured use of pen and ink.

Among the literary works he illustrated were the novels of Robert Louis Stevenson, Alexandre Dumas, Robert W. Chambers, and Rebecca West, and the plays of William Shakespeare. His art was also published by American Magazine, Cosmopolitan, Liberty, St. Nicholas, and Woman’s Home Companion.

At the time of his death, Price was honorary president of the Society of Illustrators in New York.
