= Muriel Guilbault =

Canadian actress and comedian

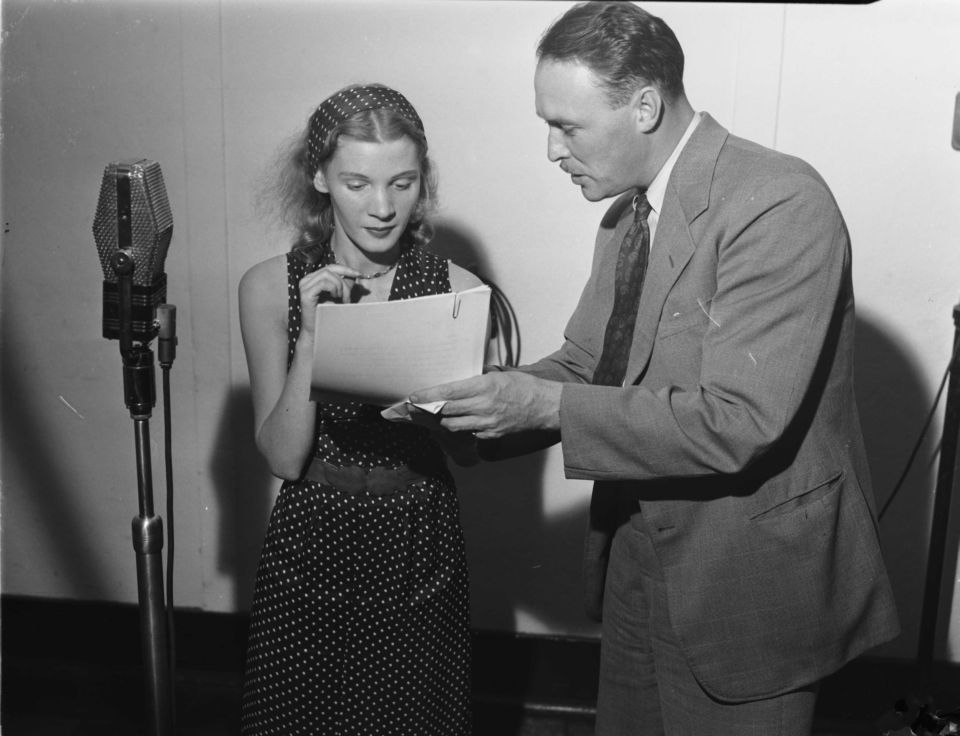
- Muriel Guilbault and director Jacques DesBaillets in 1945.
- Born: February 18, 1922
- Died: January 3, 1952 (aged 29); Montreal, Quebec, Canada
- Occupation: Actress

Muriel Guilbault (February 18, 1922 – January 3, 1952) was a Canadian actress and comedian. She was also a cosigner of the Refus Global, an artistic manifesto published in 1948, with the support of fifteen co-signers including painters Jean-Paul Riopelle, Claude Gauvreau, Pierre Gauvreau, Marcel Barbeau and Marcelle Ferron. She was the sister of actress Dyne Mousso.
