= Adam Seelig =

Canadian-American poet and playwright (born 1975)

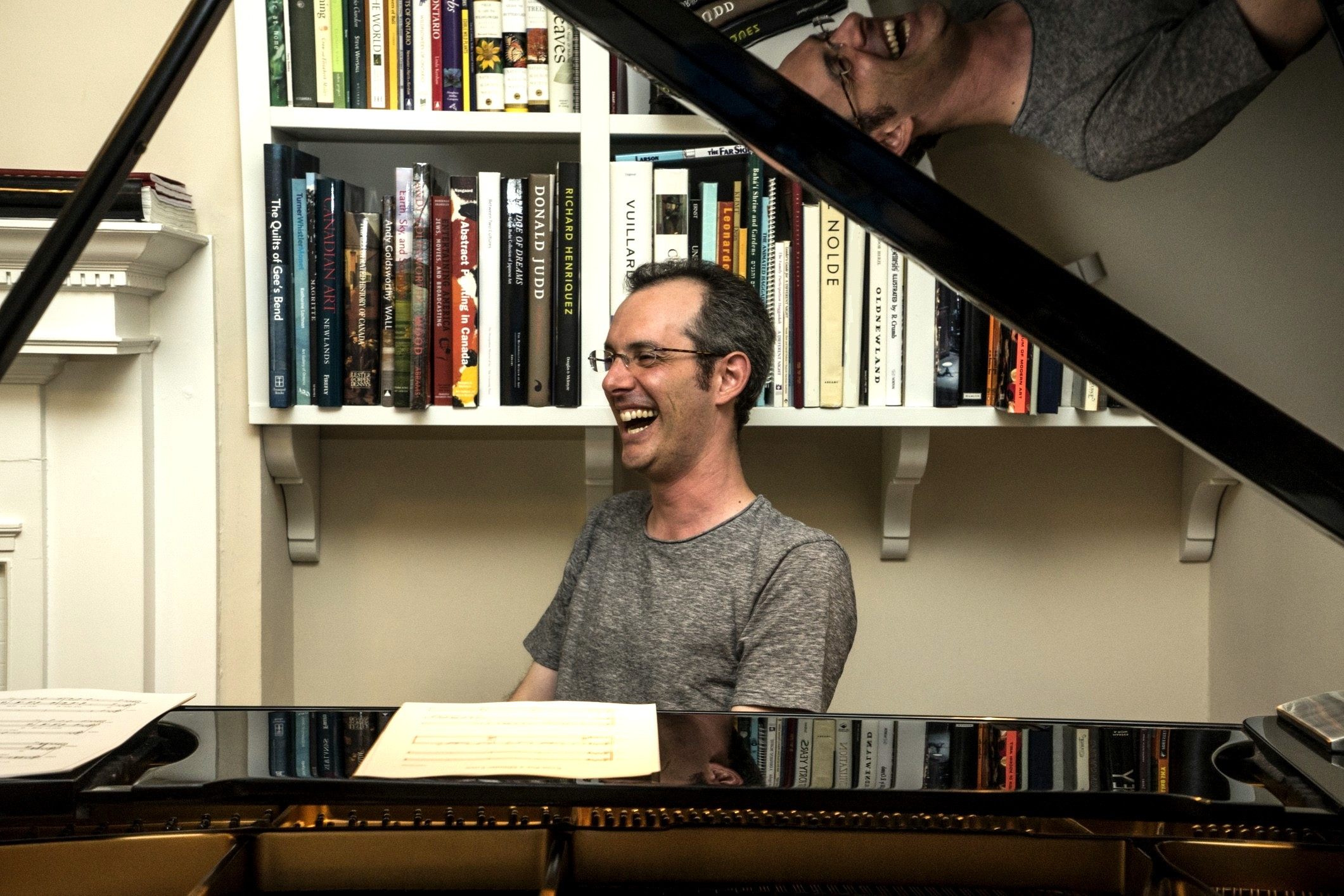
- Adam Seelig in August 2014 at a piano, smiling while surrounded by books in his home library
- Born: 1975 (age 50–51); Vancouver, British Columbia, Canada
- Education: Stanford University (BA)
- Occupations: Poet, playwright, theatre director

Adam Seelig (born 1975) is a Canadian-American poet, playwright, theatre director, composer, and artistic director of the One Little Goat Theatre Company in Toronto.

== Background and Education ==
Adam Seelig was born in Vancouver, BC, Canada, to an Israeli father and an American mother.

Seelig's early theatre experiences included directorial apprenticeships at the Arts Club Theatre Company in Vancouver and the Tarragon Theatre in Toronto. One of his early poems was published in Saul Bellow and Keith Botsford's The Republic of Letters.

As an undergraduate at Stanford University, Seelig studied English literature with John Felstiner, Marjorie Perloff, and Gilbert Sorrentino. He studied theatre with Carl Weber, completing a BA in 1998 with a thesis on Samuel Beckett's original manuscripts. During his undergraduate studies, he wrote and directed a play entitled Inside the Whale (named after an essay by George Orwell). Seelig also founded an organization known as the "Silly Society of Stanford."

== Directing ==
In 2002, Seelig founded the One Little Goat Theatre Company, in New York City and Toronto. With the company, he directed works by poet-playwrights Yehuda Amichai, Thomas Bernhard, Jon Fosse, Claude Gauvreau, Luigi Pirandello, as well as his own plays, which include reinterpretations of classic material.

Seelig's work focuses on developing poetic theatre. This includes the concept of "charactor," which entails the combination of an actor's onstage persona with their offstage nature. He also addresses the "prism/gap" between actor and audience, as well as the ambiguity that exists between them. His direction avoids naturalism.

In 2017, Seelig's direction of Smyth/Williams, a dramatic recounting of a verbatim confession of Russell Williams, was criticized by the victims' families.

== Writing ==
Beginning with the 2010 publication of Every Day in the Morning (slow), Seelig's writing combines poetic lyricism with concrete poetry. Written largely in the second person, the work uses punctuation to form what has been described as a "continuous concrete-lyric-drop-poem novella".

Since 2010, Seelig's plays employ the same drop-poem technique where "words often align vertically, configured spatially." The format has been described by critics as "a musical score," a "poetry trick," and "eye hockey." This format allows actors to "pace and emphasize the text" as they see fit.

== Music ==
Music is a central element in Seelig’s work rather than a background feature. This approach appears across both stage and prose projects.

For Ubu Mayor, described as “a play with music,” Seelig wrote eight songs and played piano in the band at the production’s premiere. The work has been characterized as an “anti-musical.”

For Music Music Life Death Music: An Absurdical, Seelig wrote seven songs and played a Fender Rhodes electric piano at the premiere. Sheet music for both productions is included in their print and digital editions.

Music also plays a significant role in Seelig’s drop-poem novella Every Day in the Morning (slow), with particular emphasis on minimalist composers such as Steve Reich.

== Essays ==
- "Beckett's Dying Remains: The Process of Playwriting in the 'Ohio Impromptu' Manuscripts."
- “The Anonlinear Aesthetic."
- "Transcending Hyperspecificity."
- "EMERGENSEE: GET HEAD OUT OF ASS: 'Charactor' and Poetic Theatre."
- Contemporary Canadian poets Seelig has reviewed or interviewed include Gregory Betts, Sylvia Legris, Donato Mancini, Lisa Robertson, Jordan Scott, and playwright-novelist Sean Dixon.

== Translation ==
Seelig has translated Hebrew works by modern Israeli poets Yehuda Amichai and Dan Pagis, as well as contemporary poets Navit Barel and Tehila Hakimi. With Harry Lane, he translated Someone is Going to Come by Norwegian playwright Jon Fosse.
