= Françoise Riopelle =

Canadian choreographer (1927–2022)

- Born: Françoise Lespérance; 18 June 1927; Montreal, Quebec, Canada
- Died: 18 July 2022 (aged 95); Montreal, Quebec, Canada
- Occupation(s): Dancer, choreographer
- Spouses: Jean-Paul Riopelle (m. 1946; div. 1953): Pierre Mercure; Neil Chotem
- Children: 3

Françoise Riopelle (née Lespérance; 18 June 1927 – 18 July 2022) was a Canadian dancer and choreographer from Montreal. She is considered one of the pioneers of modern dance in Quebec. Riopelle was also a dedicated activist, associated with the Automatistes, and was one of sixteen signatories to the Refus Global in 1948.

== Life and work ==
Riopelle was born in Montreal, Quebec in 1927. In 1946, at the age of 20, she married the painter Jean-Paul Riopelle and moved with him to Paris. While in Paris, Riopelle studied modern dance and choreography before returning to Montreal in 1958.

Riopelle is credited, along with Françoise Sullivan and Jeanne Renaud, as being the pioneers of modern dance in Quebec.

In 1959, she founded the École moderne de danse de Montréal, the first school in Canada dedicated to contemporary dance. The two artists also founded the dance company Groupe de danse moderne de Montréal which performed from 1961 to 1965. The school participated in the first International Week of Today's Music/Semaine internationale de musique actuelle, a festival of contemporary music and dance that was held in Montreal in 1961.

In 1978, she founded with Dena Davida the choreographer's collective "Qui danse?".

== Activism ==
Riopelle was one of two youngest signatories (with Thérèse Leduc) to the Refus Global, an anti-establishment manifesto published in 1948 by a group of Québécois artists and intellectuals closely associated with Les Automatistes.

== Personal life ==
She had two daughters with Jean-Paul Riopelle: Yseult-Mia in 1948 and Sylvie in 1949. The couple separated in 1953. She later married Pierre Mercure; the couple had a son. Mercure died in 1966 and Riopelle married Neil Chotem who died in 2008. She died at the Jewish General Hospital in Montreal on 18 July 2022, aged 95.
