= Madeleine Arbour =

Canadian painter (1923–2024)

Madeleine Arbour CM CQ RCA
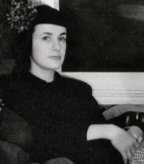
- Arbour in 1947
- Born: Madeleine Marie Gertrude Arbour; 3 March 1923; Granby, Quebec, Canada
- Died: 10 December 2024 (aged 101); L'Île-Perrot, Quebec, Canada
- Occupations: Designer; painter; journalist
- Spouse: Pierre Gauvreau (1949–1970s)
- Children: 2
- Awards: Member of the Order of Canada (CM, 1986); National Order of Quebec (Chevalière, 1999)

Madeleine Marie Gertrude Arbour CM CQ RCA (3 March 1923 – 10 December 2024) was a Canadian designer, painter and journalist in Quebec. She was the first woman to preside over the Conseil des arts de Montréal. Arbour was recognized as a pioneer in interior design, communication and visual arts.

== Biography ==
Madeleine Marie Gertrude Arbour was born in Granby, Quebec on 3 March 1923. Arbour worked in Québécois television as a journalist and as a set designer. She also worked in theatre, designing costumes and sets, including the Théâtre du Rideau Vert and the Compagnie Jean-Duceppe. During the 1940s, she was associated with Les Automatistes and signed the Refus Global manifesto in 1948. In addition, she taught at the Institute of Applied Arts in Montreal and the Collège du Vieux-Montréal.

In 1965, she established an interior design company. Among her major works are the design of Via Rail coaches, Air Canada aircraft, the interior of the former studio of painter Jean-Paul Riopelle, a room at the Citadelle of Quebec and public spaces at the residence of the Governor General of Canada. In 1974, she animated the title card to Patof for CFTM-DT.

Arbour received significant recognition for her contributions to the Canadian visual arts and design scene; in 1986, she was appointed Member of the Order of Canada (CM). In 1998, she was further awarded the Prix Condorcet. She was appointed a Chevalière (Knight) of the National Order of Quebec (CQ) in 1999. In 2001, she was named to the Royal Canadian Academy of Arts (RCA).

In 1984, Arbour was recognized by the Conseil national du design for her contributions to the development of Canadian design. She was also the subject of an exhibition at the Musée national des beaux-arts du Québec: "Madeleine Arbour: espace de bonheur".

Arbour was married to Pierre Gauvreau from 1949 until the 1970s, and had two children with him. In 2012, she received the Queen Elizabeth II Diamond Jubilee Medal.

She died in L'Île-Perrot, on 10 December 2024, at the age of 101.
