= Louise Renaud =

Canadian painter (1922–2020)

- Born: 3 August 1922; Montreal, Quebec, Canada
- Died: 19 October 2020 (aged 98); Berkeley, California, U.S.
- Movement: Les Automatistes

Louise Renaud (3 August 1922 – 19 October 2020) was a Canadian painter and dancer associated with Les Automatistes.

== Career ==
Renaud was born in Montreal, Quebec, and studied at the École des beaux-arts de Montréal from 1938 to 1942. She attended Erwin Piscator's Dramatic Workshop and Studio in New York City from 1943 to 1945. While in New York City, Renaud was also a governess for the children of art dealer Pierre Matisse, the son of Henri Matisse. Renaud had also trained as a dancer; her friend Françoise Sullivan stayed with her while studying dance in New York City. She was one of the signatories on Paul-Émile Borduas's Refus Global.

The choreographer Jeanne Renaud and the writer Thérèse Renaud were her sisters.

== Death ==
Renaud died on 19 October 2020 at the age of 98 at her residence in Berkeley.
