= Gauvreau =

Gauvreau is a surname. Notable people with the surname include:

- Charles Arthur Gauvreau (1860–1924), Canadian author and politician
- Claude Gauvreau (1925–1971), Quebec playwright, poet and polemicist
- Louis Gauvreau (1761–1822), businessman and politician in Lower Canada
- Louis-Honoré Gauvreau (1812–1858), physician and politician in Canada East
- Marcelle Gauvreau (1907–1968), Canadian botanist and science educator
- Pierre Gauvreau (1922–2011), Quebec painter
- René Gauvreau (born 1954), Quebec politician
- Robert Gauvreau, Ontario businessman and philanthropist

== See also ==
- Gauvreau, New Brunswick, community in Canada
