= Jeanne Renaud =

Canadian dancer (1928–2022)

Jeanne Renaud CM
- Born: August 27, 1928; Montreal, Canada
- Died: September 15, 2022 (aged 94)
- Education: École de musique Vincent-d'Indy
- Occupations: Dancer; choreographer
- Relatives: Louise Renaud (sister); Thérèse Renaud (sister)
- Awards: Prix Denise-Pelletier (1989); Governor General's Performing Arts Awards (1995); Order of Canada (1998)

Jeanne Renaud CM (August 27, 1928 – September 15, 2022) was a Canadian dancer, choreographer, and artistic director, considered to be one of the founders of modern dance in Quebec. Born in Montreal, Renaud studied music at the École de musique Vincent-d'Indy. She trained in classical ballet with Elizabeth Leese and in modern dance with Gérald Crevier in Montreal. She went on to study with Merce Cunningham, Hanya Holm and Mary Anthony in New York City. In 1948, she gave a recital with Françoise Sullivan in Montreal. She taught dance in Paris from 1949 to 1954. In 1952, she joined with Les Automatistes who had left Quebec for Paris to present a performance at the American Club there. From 1959 to 1965, she was associated with Françoise Riopelle at the École de Danse Moderne de Montréal as dancer, teacher and choreographer. In 1966, she founded Le Groupe de la Place Royale, the first official modern dance company in Quebec, with Peter Boneham; she was dancer, choreographer, artistic director and administrator for Le Groupe until 1972.

After leaving Le Groupe, from 1971 to 1975, with Ed Kostiner, she operated Galerie III, a space for contemporary visual art, theatre, music and dance. She next worked for the Canada Council, then the Quebec Ministère des affaires culturelles and then was head of the Conservatoire d'art dramatique du Québec for both Montreal and Quebec City. From 1985 to 1987, she was artistic director with Linda Stearns for Les Grands Ballets Canadiens. From 1987 to 1989, she taught in the dance department of the Université du Québec à Montréal, retiring in the latter year.

She was awarded the Prix Denise-Pelletier in 1989 and, in 1995, the Governor General's Award for the Performing Arts. In 1998, she was named to the Order of Canada.

Renaud married Jean-Pierre Labrecque around 1948; the couple had a daughter and a son. They separated in the early 1970s.

The writer Thérèse Renaud and the artist Louise Renaud were her sisters.
