= Fauteux (surname) =

Fauteux is a French surname. It may refer to:

- Aegidius Fauteux (1876–1941), Canadian journalist, librarian, and historian
- André Fauteux (born 1947), Canadian sculptor
- Claire Fauteux (1890–1988), Canadian painter, illustrator, and author
- Gaspard Fauteux (1898–1963), Canadian politician; brother of Gérald
- Gérald Fauteux (1900–1980), Canadian Chief Justice and university chancellor; brother of Gaspard
- Guillaume-André Fauteux (1874–1940), Canadian politician
- Henriette Fauteux-Massé (1924–2005), Canadian painter
- Jacques Fauteux (1933–2009), Canadian radio and television announcer and presenter
- Roger Fauteux (1923–2021), Canadian artist
