= Marcel Barbeau =

Canadian artist

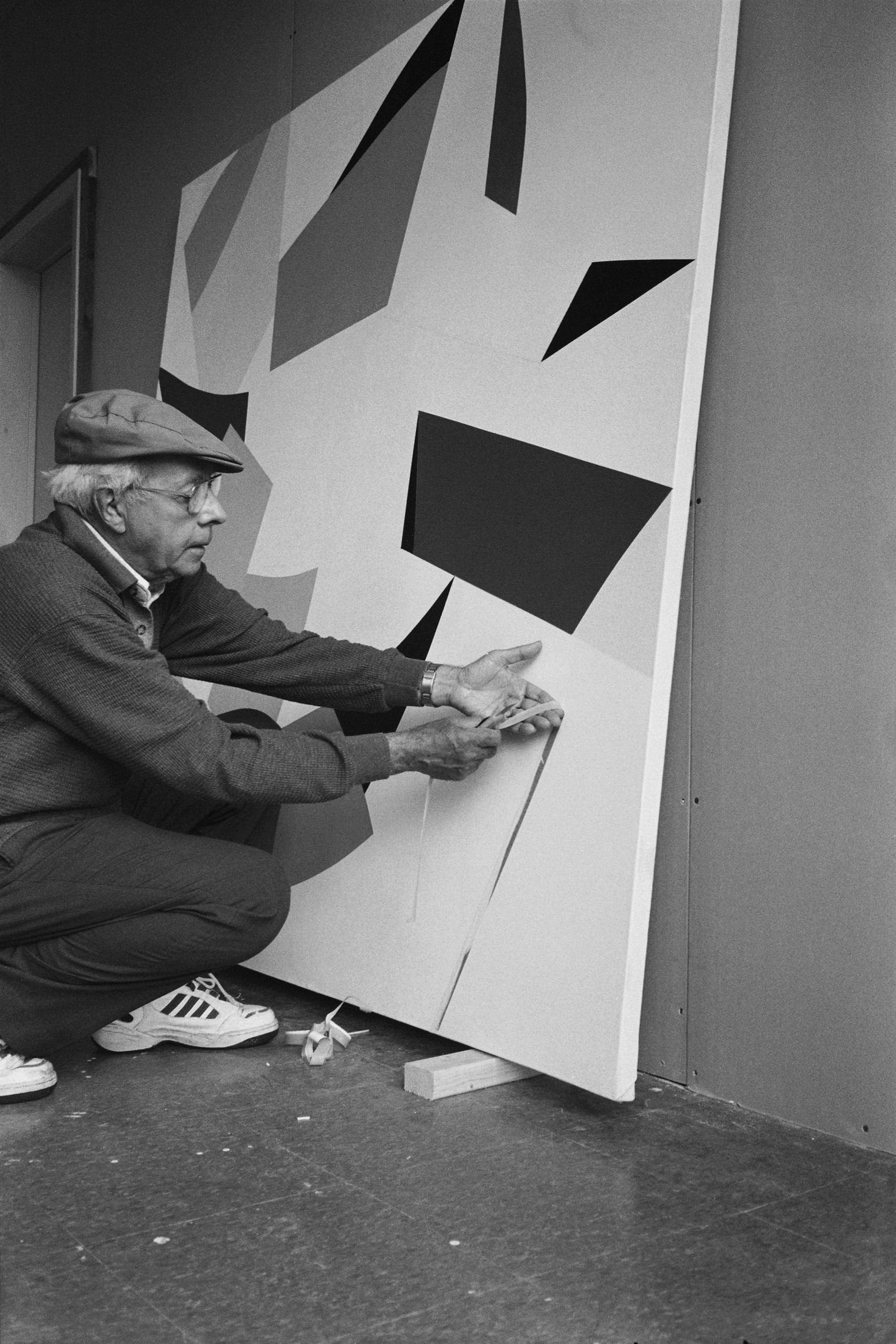
- Marcel Barbeau at his atelier in Estrie, Sutton, Quebec in 2001
- Born: Christian Marcel Barbeau; February 18, 1925; Montreal, Quebec, Canada
- Died: January 2, 2016 (aged 90); Montreal, Quebec, Canada
- Known for: Multidisiplinary artist
- Spouses: Suzanne Meloche (m. 1948) Ninon Gauthier (m. 1975)

Marcel Barbeau, OC OQ RCA (February 18, 1925 – January 2, 2016) was a Canadian painter, sculptor, and graphic and performance artist who used different forms of abstraction and art techniques and technology to express himself.

== Career ==
Born in Montreal, he studied with Paul-Émile Borduas at l'École du Meuble in Montreal and later shared a studio with classmate Jean-Paul Riopelle. At the Ecole Barbeau associated with other students of Borduas. Together, they formed a group which became known as the Automatistes. Barbeau, like the others, was specially interested in psychoanalysis and the use of the unconscious and this interest influenced his work from 1946 to 1957. With them, he signed the Refus Global in 1948 because he and the other signatories wanted to be free of formal structures - a movement which extended far beyond painting.

When Riopelle and Borduas left Montreal for Paris and New York respectively and the other signatories formed the Plasticians, he began to investigate his own form of abstraction. He exhibited small ink non-objective paintings in NYC (1952) and also exhibited in Montreal, Ottawa and Quebec City. In 1957 he returned to drawing from live models and experimented with calligraphy, then focused on drawing and collage which continued to be his main interest until 1961. From 1964 to 1968 he researched Op Art and film techniques. He lived in Paris from 1962-1964 where he next exhibited his work. He then moved to NYC where he lived and worked for the next four years (1964-1968), exhibiting his work and in Montreal showing his work at Galerie du Siècle while taking part in group shows in both cities. In 1969, the Winnipeg Art Gallery in collaboration with the Musée d'art contemporain de Montréal, held a retrospective exhibition of his work.

As a painter and sculptor, Barbeau addressed most of the fields in the visual arts. As a multidisciplinary artist, he tried to change the plastic language by transgressing disciplinary boundaries. His collages became paintings (1959-1963 and 1986-2005), art prints (1969) and sculptures (1984-1988). His drawings of poems, made of words and letters, sometimes have borrowed their medium and relief from painting (1957). His sculptures resemble drawings thrown in space (1971-1977) or look like small shelters, almost architectural (1985-1992). His performances, real stagings of the act of creation, materialized through paintings, drawings and, under his directive with the complicity of photographers or film directors, through photographs, films and videos, giving some permanence to otherwise ephemeral artistic gestures (1972-1980).

Curiosity led Barbeau to study the main contemporary artistic trends originating from other disciplinary fields. His interest in those art forms encouraged him to draw on their structures in order to find some convergences, connivances, anchor points or to confirm aesthetic intuitions. He used poetry, music, dance and architecture to renew his art, as for example, his phonic calligraphies (1957-1960) inspired by his friend Claude Gauvreau's poetry or his interdisciplinary events from the seventies and the eighties. He even created works that fall under these disciplines such as his phonic chants from the mid-eighties, which appear in the portrait film by Manon Barbeau entitled "Barbeau, Libre comme l'art"; his dance-action paintings from the seventies; the choreography he created for the opening dance part of his exhibit at Domaine Cataraqui (1999). Despite its diversity and profusion, his work reveals a unity. Economy of means and aesthetic perfection was of great concern for him.

In 2010, Barbeau said in an interview about his work:

"When I paint I never look for an emotion. But the forms in the painting will get together and nearly make love; the forms want to live together."

== Public collections ==
Barbeau is represented in well over fifty public and corporate collections including the National Gallery of Canada; the Art Gallery of Ontario; and the Stedelijk Museum, Amsterdam.

== Honours ==
- 1972 Canada Council’s Victor Martyn Lynch-Staunton Award
- 1995 Officer of the Order of Canada
- 1998 Barbeau`s work is used as a stamp by Canada Post as a part of the collection on the Automatistes
- 2003 member, Royal Canadian Academy of Arts
- 2013 Governor General's Awards in Visual and Media Arts
- 2013 Paul-Émile Borduas Award, prix du Québec
- 2015 Ordre National of Québec

== Legacy ==
Barbeau`s fonds is available at the Archives de l'UQAM - Fonds Marcel Barbeau (University of Quebec Archives), Montreal, QC and the Archives nationale du Québec- Archives de l’audio visuel (Quebec National Archives, audio-visual Archives), Quebec City, QC

== Bibliography ==
- Gagnon, Carolle; Gauthier, Ninon (1990). Marcel Barbeau: Le Regard en Fugue/Marcel Barbeau: Fugato. Montreal: CECA Inc.
