= The Noble Savage (magazine) =

Literary magazine in the USA (1960–1962)

- Editor: Saul Bellow; Keith Botsford; Jack Ludwig
- Categories: Literary magazine
- Publisher: Meridian Books
- Founder: Saul Bellow; Jack Ludwig
- Founded: 1960
- First issue: Spring 1960
- Final issue: 1962
- Country: United States
- Based in: Cleveland, Ohio
- Language: English
- OCLC: 1607395

The Noble Savage was an American literary magazine which existed between 1960 and 1962. The magazine was founded by Saul Bellow and Jack Ludwig. They also edited the magazine of which the publisher was Meridian Books based in Cleveland, Ohio. Later Keith Botsford joined the magazine as the editor.

The first issue which was published in Spring 1960 contained works by Harold Rosenberg, John Berryman, Ralph Ellison, and Josephine Herbst. Later issues included the work by Thomas Pynchon, Robert Coover and Arthur Miller. The fourth issue presented work from different countries, including G. V. Desani, Dan Jacobson, Elemire Zolla, Louis Guilloux and Antoni Slonimski. Edward Hoagland and Lucia Berlin also published their early works in the magazine. The fifth and last issue of the Noble Savage was published in 1962.
