= Guilbault =

Guilbault is a surname. Notable people with the surname include:

- Édouard Guilbault (1834–1903), Canadian manufacturer, merchant and politician from Quebec
- Élise Guilbault (born 1961), Canadian film and television actress
- Geneviève Guilbault (born 1982), Canadian politician
- Jacques Guilbault (born 1936), Canadian politician
- Jean-Guy Guilbault (1931–2022), Canadian businessman and politician
- Jocelyne Guilbault, Canadian ethnomusicologist
- Muriel Guilbault (1922–1952), Canadian actress and comedian
- Roland Guilbault (1934–2012), American Navy rear admiral
