= Noam Gagnon =

Canadian dancer (born 1963)

- Born: 1963 (age 61–62); Montreal, Quebec, Canada
- Education: Concordia University
- Occupation(s): Dancer, choreographer, artistic director, pilates teacher
- Career
- Current group: Vision Impure
- Former groups: The Holy Body Tattoo, Le Groupe Dance Lab
- Website: visionimpure.org

Noam Gagnon (born 1963 in Montreal) is a Canadian dancer. Outside of his work in dance, Gagnon is a certified teacher in pilates and the Franklin method. He is currently an associate dance artist with the National Arts Center in Ottawa and artistic director of Vancouver-based dance company, Vision Impure.

== Early life and career ==
Coming from a family of artists and musicians, Gagnon was introduced to the arts at an early age. His first experience with dance was performing a solo in a peers' piece during a visual arts training program. Following this, he decided to further explore dance as a form taking classes in dance and choreography at Concordia University. Eventually, he graduated from Concordia in 1987 with a degree in Dance and Choreography. After completion of his degree Gagnon moved to Vancouver where he joined EDAM (Experimental Dance and Music) and later to Ottawa, dancing for Le Groupe Dance Lab. in 1993 he formed the company Holy Body Tattoo with co-artistic director Dana Gringas where he choreographed, directed, and performed for 16 years. As a performer, Gagnon is said to be, "known for holding nothing back, physically or emotionally, in his full-throttle performances."

== Holy Body Tattoo ==
Gagnon served as co-artistic director, alongside Dana Gringas, and choreographer of the Holy Body Tattoo. He first met Gringas at EDAM (Experimental Dance and Music) in Vancouver. They also danced together with a company in Ottawa, Le Groupe Dance Lab. Returning to Vancouver, they co-founded the dance company in 1993, becoming artist in residence at The Vancouver East Cultural Center in 1998. The name, Holy Body Tattoo, references the permanence of life experience that becomes part of the body. With the company they created both live performances and several dance films. Their film, Poetry and Apocalypse (1994), has been screened at 16 film festivals internationally. Holy Body Tattoo has produced inter-disciplinary collaborative works with several musical, literary, and visual artists. Their piece Circa (2000) had live accompaniment from British band, The Tiger Lillies. With this work, the company was invited to perform at Ein Festival by acclaimed choreographer Pina Bausch. The National Arts Center commissioned a piece through the CGI Youth Commission for 9 dancers called Monumental in 2005 as part of a partnership with the Canada Council of the Arts. In 2016, Monumental was remounted by the PuSh International Performing Arts Festival with live accompaniment from Montreal based band, Godspeed You! Black Emperor. The remounted work also incorporated visual elements by William Morrison and projected text written by Jenny Holzer. The company has performed around the world including at the Sydney Opera House, the Barbican Centre in London, the New Moves Across Europe Festival in Glasgow, the Marator de L'Espectacle in Barcelona, and the Pride Arts Festival in London. Holy Body Tattoo is credited with helping to pioneer the distribution of dance across many platforms including using its online presence to sell merchandise, marketing in music and film, and appearances in international club circuits.

== Vision Impure ==
Gagnon and Gringas both chose to pursue solo ventures after their 2005 creation, Monumental. Gagnon created his own satellite company of the Holy Body Tattoo called Vision Impure in 2006. With Vision Impure, he has created several full-length works; Thank You, You're Not Welcome, This Crazy Show, Pathways and The Vision Impure. The Vision Impure was the first work produced by his new company and received an Isadora Award for Excellence in Performance in 2008. Gagnon continued to use film as an accompaniment to live performance as he had with Holy Body Tattoo. In his work with Vision Impure, Gagnon explores themes of relationships, intimacy, perception, identity, and self reflection. Gagnon produced an evening length solo on himself called This Crazy Show in 2016. In this work he dons heels, wigs, and a suit at certain points - moving through a set with randomly placed furniture and props that was created through inspiration from Salvador Dalí and M. C. Escher. Vision Impure's work has been presented throughout Canada, with Gagnon's most recent work Pathways being presented at the Vancouver International Dance Festival and Dancing on the Edge.

== Pilates ==
Gagnon began training in pilates in 1987. He received his first certification in 2003 from The Pilates Center of Boulder, Colorado. He opened Beyond Pilates, a studio in Vancouver, in 2005. At his studio, he teaches students and runs a pilates teacher training program. Gagnon is quoted in The Georgia Straight as saying, "One thing that is clear is that you don’t bring the dance into Pilates, you use Pilates for the dance, when you need it."

== Awards ==
1997 : Dora Mavor Moore Award for Outstanding Performance (Our Brief Eternity with Holy Body Tattoo)

2000 : Inaugural Alcan Performing Arts Award, Presented by the Vancouver East Cultural Center (Circa with Holy Body Tattoo)

2008 : Isadora Award for Excellence in Performance to Noam Gagnon (The Vision Impure with Company Vision Impure)
