= Holy Body Tattoo =

Canadian contemporary dance company

- Founded: 1993
- Founders: Noam Gagnon; Dana Gingras; Jean-Yves Theriault
- Type: Contemporary dance company
- Location: Vancouver, British Columbia, Canada

The Holy Body Tattoo is a Canadian contemporary dance company based in Vancouver, British Columbia.

Formed in 1993 by co-artistic directors and choreographers Noam Gagnon and Dana Gingras, who had performed together since 1987, and also Jean-Yves Thériault composer-musician and co-founder of Voivod, initially as a multi-media dance company, they have performed throughout Canada, Europe, Asia, and the United States, and received international critical acclaim as well.

The company has been Artist in Residence at the Vancouver East Cultural Centre since 1998.

Their performances have included collaborations with musical, visual, and literary artists including author William Gibson, UK bands Tindersticks and The Tiger Lillies, visual artist Jenny Holzer and Bill Pechet.

Their repertoire includes the works White Riot and Poetry & Apocalypse (1994); our brief eternity (1996); Circa (2000), a tango-influenced pas de deux; Running Wild (2004); and Monumental (2005), which explored modern anxiety in urban corporate culture.

Poetry & Apocalypse was adapted into a film in 1997 by William Morrison (director).
