= Rodrigue Tremblay =

Canadian politician (born 1939)

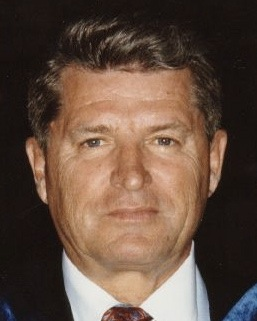
- Born: October 13, 1939 (age 86); Matane, Quebec
- Education: Laval University; University of Montreal; Stanford University
- Known for: Economist; Quebec government
- Scientific career
- Fields: Economics; Geopolitics
- Workplaces: Stanford University; University of Montreal

Rodrigue Tremblay (born October 13, 1939) is a Canadian economist, humanist and political figure. He is an emeritus professor of economics at the Université de Montréal. He specializes in macroeconomics, international trade and finance, and public finance. He is the author of books in economics and politics. Tremblay's documents and archives are kept at the Center of Archives of the Quebec National Library and Archives, in Montreal, Quebec.

== Biography ==
Rodrigue Tremblay was born in Matane, Quebec, on October 13, 1939, the son of George Tremblay (fils), a contractor, and Germaine St-Louis. Tremblay is a graduate of the College of Matane (1st promotion of 1961), (now CÉGEP de Matane), where he received a Université Laval (1961), of Université de Montréal (B.Sc. in Economics 1963), and of Stanford University (M.A. 1965 and Ph.D. 1968). At Stanford, he worked with Paul A. Baran, Lorie Tarshis, Emile Despres and Ronald McKinnon. He is married to Carole Howard Tremblay, an author, and the couple has three children (Jean-Paul, Alain and Joanne) as well as seven grandchildren including Canadian musician, broadcaster and former Ski Cross athlete Phil Tremblay. He has been a professor of economics at the Université de Montréal since 1967. He has been professor emeritus since 2002.

Tremblay was president of the Société canadienne de science économique (1974–75) and of the North American Economics and Finance Association (1986–87). He was chairman of the Department of Economics of the Université de Montréal (1973–76), member of the Committee of Dispute Settlements of the North American Free Trade Agreement (NAFTA) (1989–93) and vice-president of the Association internationale des économistes de langue française (AIELF), from 1999 to 2005.

He was invited scholar and economic consultant at the Bank of Canada, the Economic Council of Canada, the Quebec Commission of Inquiry on the Quebec Liquor Trade, the West African Monetary Union, the Royal Commission on the Economic Union and Development Prospects for Canada (MacDonald Commission) and the United Nations. Tremblay presided at the foundation of the North American Review of Economics and Finance and was associate editor of the Review L'Action nationale and the financial weekly Les Affaires.

Tremblay was elected a member of the National Assembly of Quebec for the Montreal riding of Gouin in the 1976 Quebec election as candidate of the Parti Québécois. He served as Minister of Industry and Trade in the Government of Quebec, from 1976 to 1979. He sponsored the sale of wine in Quebec's 12,000 private grocery stores. He resigned from the Lévesque Cabinet on September 19, 1979. He resumed his academic career on April 15, 1981.

== Economics ==
Tremblay was a proponent of the creation of a North American Free Trade Area. He is also a Quebec nationalist who attempted to reconcile the need for economic integration, economies of scale, increased productivity, an active industrial policy, and political and cultural sovereignty for small nations. As early as 1970, he outlined that vision in a book.(1) In 1986, when Prime Minister Brian Mulroney, a politician from Quebec, announced that his Progressive Conservative government would formally propose a Free Trade Agreement with the United States, Tremblay became president of a committee of Canadian economists to support the measure. The committee rallied a large number of Canadian economists behind the policy, and it met with Prime Minister Mulroney on April 25, 1988.(2)

Tremblay for one had some misgivings about the finalized free trade agreement because it included a chapter that allowed for acquisitions of Canadian companies by larger American firms without sufficient Canadian protection from predatory U.S. industrial and commercial practices, thus making it difficult for the Canadian government to implement an effective industrial policy. Later, Tremblay opposed the creation of a North American Union, (NAU) which would have further deepened the economic integration of Canada to the United States, and could have placed Canadian independence at risk.(3)

Tremblay made contributions in other fields of economics and economic policy, especially in vulgarisation, international economics, international trade, and has authored several textbooks on economics and macroeconomics. He is the author of textbooks on economics and macroeconomics in French.(4)

Tremblay has published in the Canadian Journal of Economics,(5) the Review of North American Economics and Finance,(6) the Atlantic Economic Journal,(7) the Journal of Economic Literature,(8) the Canadian Journal of Regional Science,(9) The India Economy Review,(10) Global Research,(11) Policy Options,(12) L'Action Nationale,(13) l'Actualité Économique,(14) Vigile,(15) and in the financial journal Les Affaires.(16)

== Politics ==
Tremblay is a public intellectual who is known for his contributions to the understanding of international, Canadian and Quebec politics. His political analyses have been published in The New York Times, The Wall Street Journal, The Globe and Mail, in French-language newspapers such as Le Devoir, La Presse, Le Soleil, and several other publications. He writes an international blog about economics, finance, politics and geopolitics, in many languages.(17)

Tremblay has served as an arbiter on the Committee of Dispute Settlements of NAFTA, from 1989 to 1993. Previously, he had served as Minister of Industry and Commerce in the Government of Quebec, from 1976 to 1979.(18) Also in 1979, he published a manifest for the reform of Canadian federalism entitled La 3e option (The 3rd Option) which envisaged a greater degree of political autonomy for the French-speaking province of Quebec. In 1987, when the federal government under Prime Minister Brian Mulroney introduced the Meech Lake Accord, it included some of Tremblay's ideas about political decentralization.(19)

From 1999 to 2004, Tremblay published four books about politics and geopolitics. The first, in 1999, (Les grands enjeux politiques et économiques du Québec) reproduced a series of articles published in the financial weekly Les Affaires. In 2002, Rodrigue Tremblay published a book of political philosophy entitled L’Heure Juste (The Way It Is). In 2003, his book entitled Pourquoi Bush veut la guerre, Religion, politique et pétrole dans les conflits internationaux, published more than one month before the event, dealt with the March 20, 2003 American-led invasion of Iraq. That latter book was later published in English, in French and in Turkish, under the title The New American Empire.(20)

Tremblay has previously stated his support for the Campaign for the Establishment of a United Nations Parliamentary Assembly, an organisation which campaigns for democratic reform in the United Nations, and the creation of a more accountable international political system.

== Ethics ==
In 2009 (in French) and in 2009 and in 2010 (in English), Tremblay published The Code for Global Ethics, with a preface by Dr. Paul Kurtz.(21)

The book codifies in a pedagogical way the most fundamental humanist principles of rational ethics with the objective of reconciling private and general interests in human interactions. The Code for Global Ethics proposes a progressive and modern code of global ethics that is summarized under 10 general and simple humanist rules or principles. The themes range from human dignity, human life, tolerance, the need to share, and the requirement to avoid domination and superstition, to the preservation of the Earth's natural environment, the issue of violence and wars, the question of political and economic democracy, the separation of Church and State, and the central role of education and knowledge as gateways to personal happiness, independence, and individual freedom. The book is also a critique of many religion-based ethical rules and raises the issue of moral dilemmas.

Critiques of Tremblay's book about ethics have hailed it as either a "solid, historical argument and proposals for integrating humanist philosophy into both our everyday lives, and our social institutions" (David Koepsell) and as "a rational jumping-off point toward a new society" (Victor J. Stenger), or rather, as being a "too ambitious" project (Jan Czekajewski) or as "worthy ideals grounded in the very theories that were called upon, historically, to justify atrocities and undermine peace" (Wendy C. Hamblet).

In 2003 he was one of the signers of the manifesto Humanism and Its Aspirations.

== Tremblay's ten principles for global humanism ==
The ten personal and social rules of rational humanism for a more harmonious and just world:

1. Dignity: Proclaim the natural dignity and inherent worth of human beings.
2. Respect: Respect the life and property of others.
3. Tolerance: Be tolerant of others' beliefs and lifestyles.
4. Sharing: Share with those who are less fortunate.
5. No domination: Do not dominate through lies or otherwise.
6. No superstition: Rely on reason, logic and science to understand the Universe and to solve life's problems.
7. Conservation: Conserve and improve the earth's natural environment.
8. No war: Resolve differences and conflicts without resorting to war or violence.
9. Democracy: Rely on political and economic democracy to organize human affairs.
10. Education: Develop one's intelligence and talents through education and effort.

== Honours ==
- Fellow, Université de Montréal, 1961
- Woodrow Wilson Fellow, 1963
- Ford International Fellow, Stanford University, 1964
- Prize for excellence in teaching, Université de Montréal, 1998
- Emeritus professor, 2002
- Prix Condorcet, 2004
- Prix Richard Arès, 2018

== Academic positions ==
- 2002–Present, professor emeritus of Economics, Faculty of Arts and Sciences, Université de Montréal, Montreal, Quebec;
- 1975–2001, Professor of Economics, Department of Economics, Université de Montréal;
- 1973–1976, chairman, Department of Economics, Université de Montréal;
- 1970–1975, Associate Professor, Université de Montréal;
- 1967–1970, Assistant Professor, Université de Montréal;
- 1968, Research Fellow, Bank of Canada, Ottawa, Ont.;
- 1965–67, Research Fellow, Center for Economic Growth, Stanford University, Stanford, California.

== Non-academic positions ==
- 1999–2005, Vice president, International Association of French Economists;
- 1989–1993, Member of the Arbitration Panel, North American Free Trade Agreement, Chap.18;
- 1986–1987, President, North American Economics and Finance Association;
- 1976–1981, Member of the Quebec National Assembly, Quebec;
- 1976–1979, Minister of Industry and Commerce, Government of Quebec, Quebec;
- 1974–1975, President, Canadian Economic Society;
- 1970–1975, Advisor, West African Monetary Union;
- 1969–1971, Economist, Quebec Commission of Inquiry on the Quebec Liquor Trade.

== See also ==
- Université Laval
