= Thérèse Renaud =

Canadian poet (1927–2022)

Thérèse Renaud (July 3, 1927 – December 12, 2005) was a Canadian actress and writer associated with Les Automatistes. She was also known as Thérèse Leduc.

She was born in Montreal. Renaud went to Paris in 1946 to study theatre. On her return to Montreal, she worked as a comedian and singer, appearing on radio and television. She returned to Paris in 1959 to work on her literary work. While there, she conducted interviews with people from the arts for Radio Canada. She worked as a professional astrologer for several years.

In 1946, she published Les Sables du rêve, considered to be the first Automatist work. Renaud was a signatory to the Refus Global in 1948.

Renaud died in Paris at the age of 78.

== Personal life ==
She married the artist Fernand Leduc.

Renaud came from a talent family. The choreographer Jeanne Renaud and the artist Louise Renaud were her sisters. As well, her cousin, Estelle Mauffette, was a Quebec actress.

== Works ==
- Les Sables du rêve, poetry (1946)
- Une mémoire déchirée, memoir (1978)
- Plaisirs immobiles, prose and poetry (1981)
- Subterfuge et sortilège, prose (1988)
- Le choc d'un murmure, novel (1988)
- Jardins d'éclats, poetry (1990)
- N'être, poetry (1998)
- Un passé recomposé. Deux automatistes à Paris. Témoignages 1946-1953, memoir (2004)
