= Françoise Sullivan =

Canadian artist (born 1923)

Françoise Sullivan CM GOQ
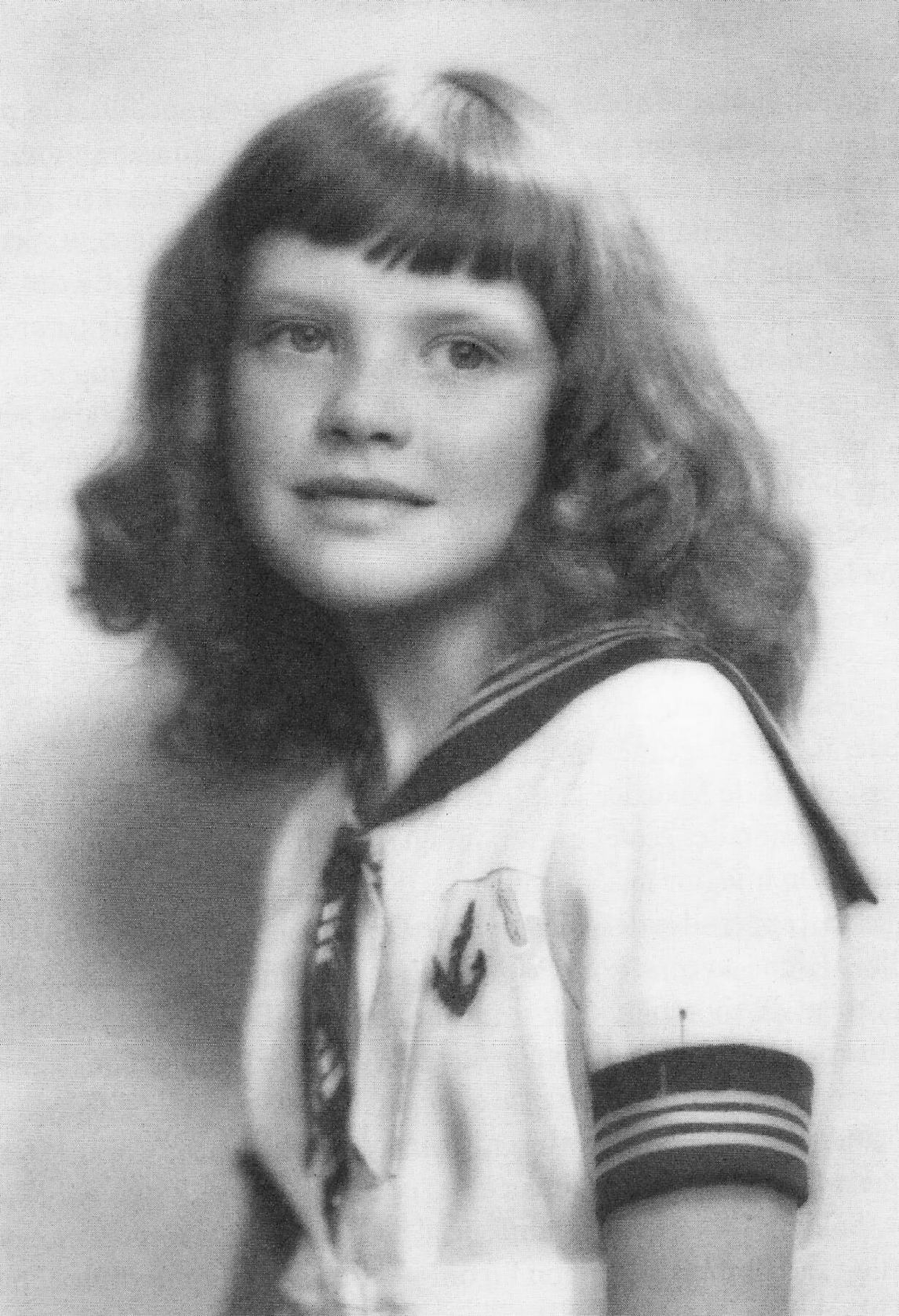
- Sullivan in 1936
- Born: 10 June 1923 (age 102); Montreal, Quebec, Canada
- Education: Hochelaga Convent
- Alma mater: École des beaux-arts de Montréal
- Style: modern dance
- Movement: Les Automatistes
- Spouse: Paterson Ewen (m. 1949–1965)

Françoise Sullivan OC GOQ LL.D (born 10 June 1923) is a Canadian painter, sculptor, dancer, choreographer and photographer whose work is marked by her ability to switch from one discipline to another.

== Biography ==
=== Early life ===
Françoise Sullivan grew up in Montreal, Quebec, the youngest child and only girl in a middle-class family with four boys. Her father was a lawyer who worked as the Deputy Minister of the Federal Post Office Department. Her father enjoyed poetry and both he and her mother encouraged her early interest in the arts by enrolling her in dance, theatre, and painting lessons.

=== Education ===
Sullivan studied classical dance with Gérald Crevier from 1934 to 1945. She also took courses in visual arts, studying at Hochelaga Convent in 1939 and, at sixteen, began attending the École des beaux-arts de Montréal from 1940 to 1944. Her early paintings were influenced by Fauvism and Cubism. In 1941, she came into contact with the Québecois painter Paul-Émile Borduas and members of the group Les Automatistes. Her friendship with Bourduas and the group influenced her paintings and performances in the following years. In 1948, Sullivan signed Les Automatistes' Refus Global manifesto, which included her essay La danse et l'espoir (Dance and Hope).

From 1945 to 1947, Sullivan lived in New York where she studied modern dance with Franziska Boas, the daughter of anthropologist Franz Boas. She also studied briefly with Martha Graham and Louis Horst. In 1949, Sullivan married painter Paterson Ewen. Between 1952 and 1956, she worked as a dancer and choreographer for CBC television. In 1959, she studied metal welding with Armand Vaillancourt. She then returned to the École des Beaux-Arts de Montréal in 1960 to study with Louis Archambault. In 1961, she studied at the École des arts et métiers in Lachine.

== Career ==
Sullivan returned to Montreal in 1947 and continued choreographing modern dance. In 1948, accompanied by Jean-Paul Riopelle and Maurice Perron, Sullivan performed Danse dans la neige (Dance in the Snow) outside in Otterburn Park, Quebec. Perron and Riopelle both documented the performance, however, only Perron's photographs remain as Riopelle's film footage was later lost. Like other members of Les Automatistes Sullivan was interested in 'psychic automatism' and Danse dans la neige was the second in a series of performances in which Sullivan improvised gestural movements to explore the seasons. Danse dans la neige is considered one of the most significant pieces of performance art in Canadian art history. The only score was the crunching of her own footsteps in the thickly crusted snow; her small audience consisted of Riopelle, Perron, their cameras, and the landscape itself. In 2007, Sullivan reworked her first two performances Summer and Danse dans la neige and completed two more choreographed dances which were filmed by Mario Côté to create Les Saisons Sullivan.

On 3 April 1948 Sullivan performed with her dance partner, Jeanne Renaud, at Ross House on the McGill University campus in Montreal. Their collaborative performance featured choreographed and improvised movements, accompanied by a poetry reading by Claude Gauvreau. This event is considered a significant moment in the history of modern dance in Quebec.

In the late 1950s, Sullivan turned to sculpture under the guidance of Armand Vaillancourt and learned welding at École des arts et métiers in Lachine, Québec. Her work was soon recognized as some of the most important modern sculpture in Quebec. In 1960, she took a three-month course in sculpture with Louis Archambault at the École des beaux-arts de Montréal where she learned how to work with wood, iron, and plaster. In 1967, Sullivan received multiple commissions for monumental public sculpture. One, Callooh Callay, was installed on the fairgrounds of Expo 67, and the other, Aeris Ludus, was exhibited as part of Sculpture '67 at Nathan Phillips Square. In the late 1960s, Sullivan and Ewen experimented with plexiglass. In 1976, the couple collaborated with the sculptor David Moore on a work for the infamous Corridart exhibit. The work, Legend of Artists, used a series of vitrines and didactic panels to illuminate the rich history of art and artists' lives in the city. When Jean Drapeau ordered Corridart dismantled, Sullivan was one of the twelve artists who sued the city, a case that took twelve years to win.

During the 1980s, Sullivan returned to painting. Between 1982 and 1994, she produced several series, which are regarded as the culmination of her work in this medium. These series include the Cretan Cycle (1983–85), the Hommages (2002-03), and the Tondos (1980s). In 1997, she completed Montagnes (Mountains), a granite wall located in the main lobby of President Kennedy Pavilion of Université du Québec à Montréal. Montagnes is the only permanently installed Sullivan sculpture. In 2000, UQAM awarded her an honorary doctorate. Since 1997, Sullivan has taught painting at Concordia University. In 2001, she was appointed a Member of the Order of Canada and the Musée d'art contemporain de Montréal held a retrospective of her work.

In 2023, the Montreal Museum of Fine Arts celebrated her 100th birthday with a show of recent work. The exhibition also will draw attention to the important representation of Sullivan’s work – close to 50 artworks – in the Museum collection. She celebrated her centenary on 10 June.

== Honours ==
- 1943 – Prix Maurice Cullen from École des beaux-arts de Montréal
- 1963 – Prix du Québec, Sculpture
- 1981 – Second prize- Segal Centre for Performing Arts Biennial
- 1983 – Victor Martyn Lynch-Staunton Award from the Canada Council
- 1987 – Prix Paul-Émile-Borduas
- 1990 – Member of the Royal Canadian Academy of Arts
- 1998 – Honorary doctorate from York University
- 2000 – Honorary doctorate from Université du Québec à Montréal
- 2001 – Member of Order of Canada
- 2002 – Knight of the National Order of Quebec
- 2005 – Governor General of Canada in Visual and Media Arts
- 2023 – Honorary doctorate from McGill University
- 2025 – Grand Officer of the National Order of Quebec (promotion)
