= Estelle Mauffette =

Canadian actress and comedian

Estelle Mauffette (October 6, 1904 – March 12, 1984) was a Canadian actress and comedian. She was the first actress to portray the role of Donalda in the show Un homme et son péché by Claude-Henri Grignon. She was the sister of the radio host Guy Mauffette.

== Early life ==
Mauffette was born in Montreal in 1904 to parents Léontine Lavigne Mauffette. She came from a talented family. Her cousin Thérèse Renaud became a famous Canadian actress and her brother, Guy Mauffette, was a radio host. She encouraged her brother to join the Conservatoire d'art dramatique.

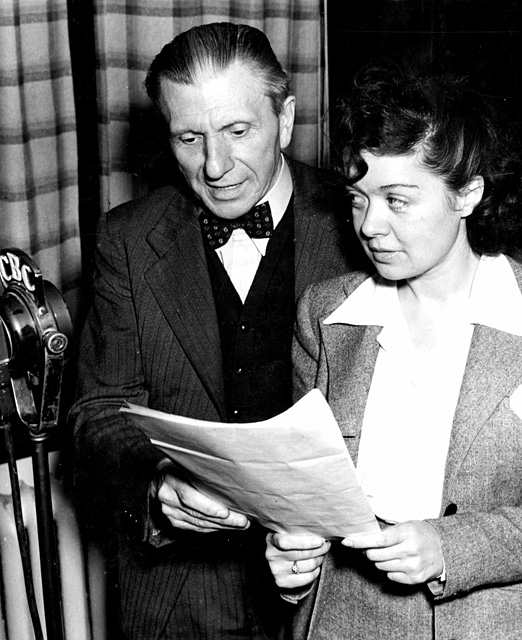
Hector Charland and Estelle Mauffette

== Career ==
Mauffette began to study drama with Jeanne Maubourg before attempting a career in radio broadcasting. Mauffette's radio career began at the radio program "Pour vous plaire" in 1931. From 1932 to 1933, Mauffette, her brother, and Hector Charland appeared in The Old Storyteller. As she was well liked, she became the first actress to portray the role of Donalda in the show Un homme et son péché by Claude-Henri Grignon. The first episode was aired on September 11, 1939 and ran on Radio-Canada from 1939 to 1962. In 1942, she was named Miss Radio. She was also part of the television series La Famille Plouffe.

Following a paralytic attack in October 1956, she decided to retire. She eventually died in 1984. After her death, Notre-Dame-de-l'Île-Perrot, a municipality in Quebec, named a street in her honour.
