= Marcelle Ferron =

Canadian artist (1924–2001)

Marcelle Ferron GOQ RCA
- Born: January 29, 1924; Louiseville, Quebec, Canada
- Died: November 19, 2001 (aged 77); Montreal, Quebec, Canada
- Resting place: Mount Royal Cemetery
- Known for: Stained glass artist, painter
- Movement: Automatistes
- Spouse: René Hamelin

Marcelle Ferron (January 29, 1924 – November 19, 2001) was a Canadian painter and stained glass artist, was one of the original 16 signatories of Paul-Émile Borduas's Refus global manifesto, and a major figure in the Quebec contemporary art scene, associated with the Automatistes.

== Early years ==
Ferron was born in Louiseville, Quebec on January 29, 1924. Her brother Jacques Ferron and her sister Madeleine Ferron were both writers. She studied at the École des beaux-arts de Québec before dropping out, unsatisfied with the way the school's instructors addressed modern art.

Ferron was an early member of Paul-Émile Borduas's Automatistes art movement. She signed the manifesto Refus global, a watershed event in the Quebec cultural scene, in 1948.

== Work ==
In 1953, she moved to Paris, where she worked for 13 years in drawing and painting and was introduced to the art of stained glass, for which she would become best known. She was particularly inspired by the work of French glass artist, Michel Blum and his innovations. Ferron returned in 1966 to Quebec, where she worked exclusively with stained glass for the next two decades.

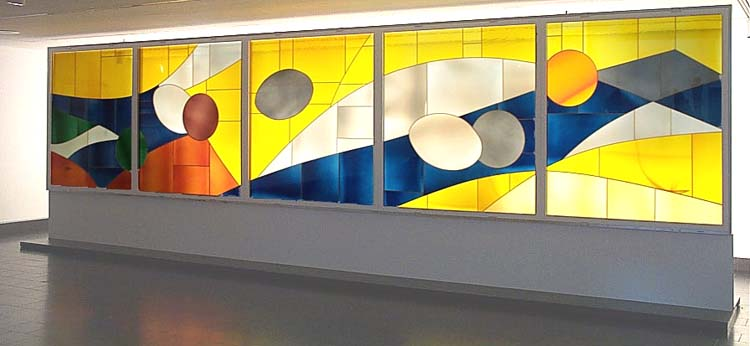
Marcelle Ferron, Untitled (1972). Stained glass. Montreal Museum of Fine Arts.

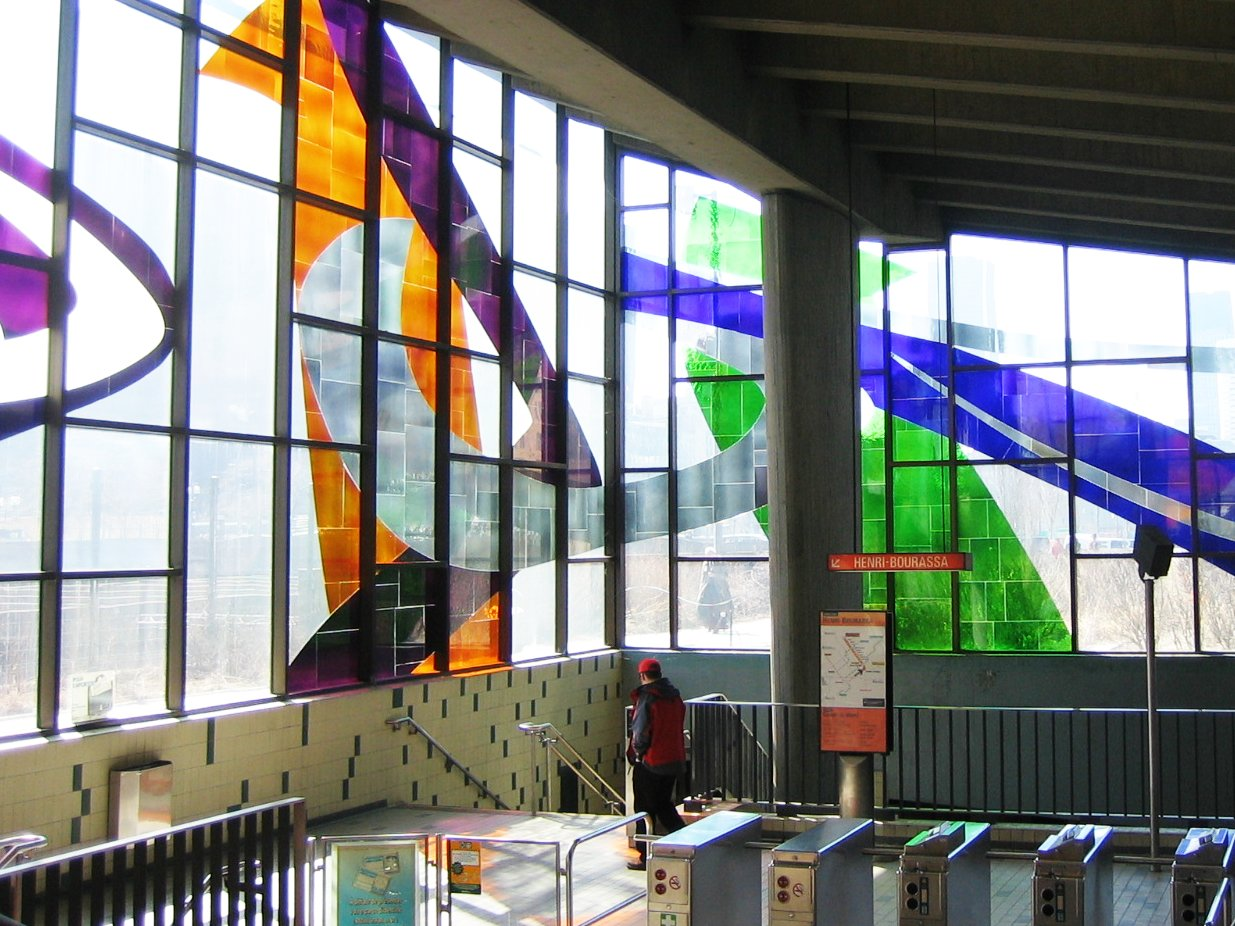
Stained-glass window by Marcelle Ferron, at Champ-de-Mars metro station in Montreal

One of her stained-glass windows is at Champ-de-Mars metro station in Montreal, Quebec. It was one of the first non-figurative works to be installed in the metro, in defiance of the didactic style present in other works of the period, and signalled a major shift in public art in Montreal between the policies of then art director Robert Lapalme and future art director and fellow automatiste Jean-Paul Mousseau. Other examples of her works can be seen at Vendôme metro station, Centre hospitalier universitaire Sainte-Justine, and the ICAO headquarters, in Montreal; the Place du Portage in Gatineau, Quebec; and the Granby, Quebec courthouse.

== Awards and honours ==
At the VI Bienal (1961) in São Paulo, Brazil, she represented Canada along with Ron Bloore, Alex Colville, Gordon Smith and Harold Town and won the silver medal, making her the first Québécoise to receive such an international recognition. In 1983, she was awarded the Paul-Émile-Borduas prize for the visual arts by the government of Quebec. In 1985, she was made a Knight of the National Order of Quebec and was promoted to Grand Officer in 2000. She also was a member of the Royal Canadian Academy of Arts.

== Death ==
She died in Montreal, Quebec, on November 19, 2001.

== Legacy ==
A nursing home in Brossard, Quebec, the Centre d'Accueil Marcelle-Ferron, is named after her. On 7 September 2019, Google honoured Ferron with a "google doodle" to mark the anniversary of the unveiling of her installation in Montreal's Vendôme station.

== Record sale prices ==
At the Heffel Auction, Post-War & Contemporary Art, November 24, 2022, lot 17, Sans titre, oil on canvas, 63 3/4 x 51 in, 161.9 x 129.5 cm, Auction Estimate: $200,000 - $300,000 CAD, realized a price of $1,801,250 (including Buyer's Premium).

At the Cowley Abbott Auction, Important Canadian Art (Sale 1), December 1, 2022, lot #43 Sans titre (1960), oil on canvas, 74.75 x 98.5 ins ( 189.9 x 250.2 cms ), Auction Estimate: $550,000.00 - $750,000.00, realized a price of $1,260,000.00.
