= One Little Goat Theatre Company =

American-Canadian "poetic theatre" company

One Little Goat Theatre Company is a theatre company devoted to modern and contemporary "poetic theatre". Founded by poet, playwright and director Adam Seelig in New York City in 2002, and based in Toronto since 2005, the company performs provocative takes on international plays. The company takes its name from the ancient Aramaic folk song that traditionally concludes the Passover Seder.

== Poetic theatre ==
Producing, developing, and defining "poetic theatre" has been One Little Goat's mandate since the company's inception. One Little Goat's Artistic Director, Adam Seelig, outlines key elements of the company's aesthetic in an essay for the Capilano Review. These elements include "charactor" (Seelig's term for combining an actor's onstage persona with their offstage nature), the "prism/gap" between actor and audience, and ambiguity. In the essay, Seelig also traces the influences of Sophocles, Zeami, Luigi Pirandello, Bertolt Brecht, Samuel Beckett, Thomas Bernhard, and others on One Little Goat's dramatic approach.

“Poetic theatre attempts to find clarity through ambiguity. It's not verse theatre or prose theatre or journalistic theatre. It's theatre that treats the text as a score [...] and treats the gap between actor and audience not as an obstacle to bypass, but as a medium through which multiple meanings can emerge. There's a difference between shining a light directly into the audience's eyes, and having it pass through a prism."

== Production history ==
Antigone : Insurgency premiered November 9–25, 2007 at the Walmer Centre Theatre in Toronto. It is a post-9/11 reworking of Sophocles' tragedy from the fifth-century BC. The production explored the socio-political repercussions of combating insurgency by drawing parallels between the original Greek tragedy and current global politics, the production explores the socio-political repercussions of combating insurgency.

Someone is Going to Come premiered March 13–29, 2009 at the Walmer Centre Theatre in Toronto. It was written by Jon Fosse, directed by Seelig, and translated from the Norwegian by Harry Lane and Adam Seelig. The three-person play centred around feelings of jealousy involves a man and a woman who move to the middle of nowhere to be alone together, but grow anxious that "someone is going to come".

Talking Masks (Oedipussy) premiered from November 13–28, 2009, at the Walmer Centre Theatre in Toronto. It was written and directed by Seelig. Talking Masks is published by BookThug (Toronto 2009).

Ritter, Dene, Voss premiered from September 23 – October 10, 2010 at La MaMa Experimental Theatre Club in New York. It was written by Thomas Bernhard, directed by Seelig, and translated from the German by Kenneth Northcott and Peter Jansen

Like the First Time premiered from October 28 – November 13, 2011 at the Walmer Centre Theatre in Toronto. It was written and directed by Seelig. It is modeled on Luigi Pirandello’s 1920 play, Come Prima Meglio di Prima, and written without punctuation. Like the First Time is published by BookThug (Toronto 2011).

The Charge of the Expormidable Moose premiered from May 10–26, 2013 at the Tarragon Theatre Extra Space in Toronto. It was written by Claude Gauvreau, directed by Seelig, and translated from the French by Ray Ellenwood. The Charge of the Expormidable Moose (La Charge de l'orignal épormyable, 1956) revolves around a poet who is envied, plagiarized, mocked and ultimately sacrificed by his fellow housemates. The Charge of the Expormidable Moose is published by Exile Editions (Toronto 1996).

Ubu Mayor premiered from September 12 – 21, 2014 at the Wychwood Theatre in Toronto. It was written, composed and directed by Seelig. It combines Ubu Roi by Alfred Jarry with the antics of Toronto mayor Rob Ford and his brother Doug. It was One Little Goat's first play to feature live music. Ubu Mayor: A Harmful Bit of Fun is published by BookThug (Toronto 2014).

Since 2016, PLAY: A (Mini) History of Theatre for Kids has been performed in Toronto elementary schools. It introduces elementary school students (grades 1–6) to the theatrical "games" known as "plays". Performed by two actors, PLAY guides young audiences through four periods of drama: Prehistoric Theatre (games around the fire); Ancient Greek Theatre (Antigone by Sophocles); Japanese Noh (Sekidera Komachi by Zeami); and Modern Theatre (Gertrude Stein, Alfred Jarry, Samuel Beckett). PLAY: A (Mini) History of Theatre for Kids is published by One Little Goat (Toronto 2019)

Smyth/Williams: An All-Female Staging of the Police Transcript premiered March 3–12, 2017 at the Theatre Passe Muraille Backspace in Toronto. On February 7, 2010, Detective Sergeant Jim Smyth of the Ontario Provincial Police interviewed Colonel Russell Williams about his possible connection to multiple crimes, including two rape murders. A mostly verbatim adaptation of the police transcript, performed by two female actors and a drummer, Smyth/Williams confronts the attitudes and norms that enable violence against women, while also challenging the conditions that support war. Smyth/Williams elicited controversy. An online petition, claiming that One Little Goat Theatre Company was sensationalizing violence against women, eventually garnered over two thousand signatures calling for the show's cancellation, and the National Post published an Op-ed denouncing the production ten days before opening. One Little Goat issued a statement clarifying the company's empathic approach to the material. Protesters appeared in the theatre lobby on opening night. Theatre critics concluded that Smyth/Williams was performed with respect and sensitivity and did not resort to sensationalism.

Music Music Life Death Music: An Absurdical premiered 25 May – June 10, 2018 at the Tarragon Theatre Extra Space in Toronto. It was written, composed and directed by Seelig. The "absurdical" explored the unexpected dynamics between three generations of family: a grandmother, her daughter, son-in-law and teenage grandson. Music Music Life Death Music is published by One Little Goat (Toronto 2018)

=== Radio Plays by Yehuda Amichai ===
English Language World Premieres, 2003–2006, various venues including the 92nd Street Y and Museum of Jewish Heritage in New York, Miles Nadal JCC in Toronto, and in a podcast for Poetry magazine.
