= Fleurette Beauchamp-Huppé =

Canadian pianist, teacher and soprano (1907–2007)

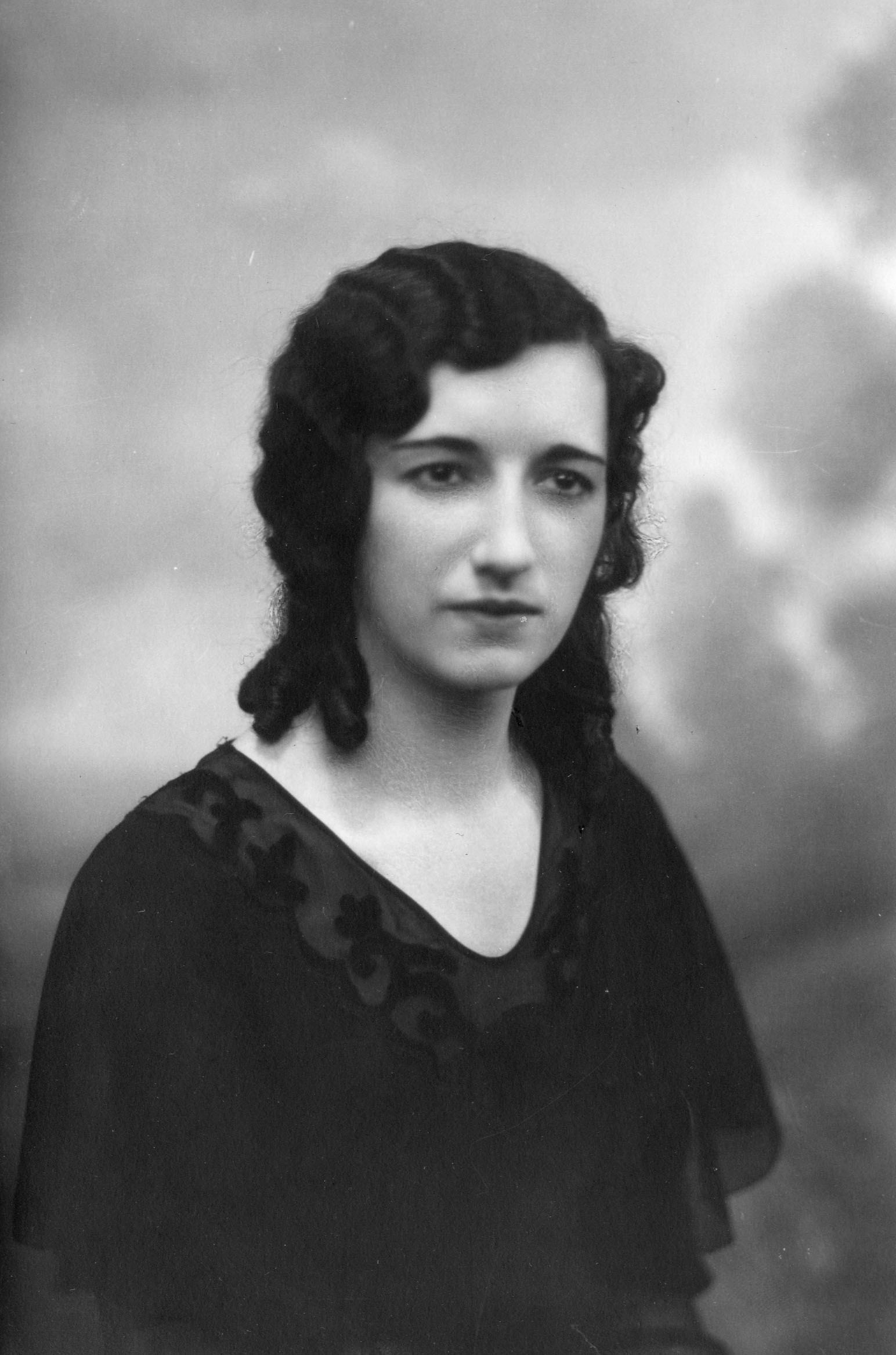
- Born: Fleurette Beauchamp; December 12, 1907; Montreal, Quebec, Canada
- Died: March 10, 2007 (aged 99); Montreal, Quebec, Canada
- Occupations: Pianist; Teacher; Soprano
- Years active: 1922–2007

Fleurette Beauchamp-Huppé (December 12, 1907 – March 10, 2007) was a Canadian pianist, teacher and soprano. She was the winner of a prize awarded by the Canadian Institute of Music each year from 1930 to 1932 and earned the Prix de Paris in 1933. Beauchamp-Huppé gave recitals, and performed the works of various pianists on CBC Radio and CKAC. She was also a teacher, mainly at the Conservatoire de musique du Québec à Montréal. There were two accompaniment studios inaugurated by the Conservatiore de musique du Québec à Montréal to recognize Beauchamp-Huppé and the conservatory named a student grant after her.

== Early life and education ==
On December 12, 1907, Fleurette Beauchamp was born in Montreal, Quebec. From 1915 to 1922, she studied piano with Alice McCaughan and later with Romain-Octave Pelletier I, Arthur Letondal and Romain Pelletier between 1922 and 1932. She also studied harmony with Rodolphe Mathieu and Henri Miro, singing with Albert Roberval and stage deportment with Jeanne Maubourg. In 1933, Beauchamp-Huppé won a scholarship at a competition at Plateau Academy from the Canadian Institute of Music to study for a year in Europe. She went on to study piano with José Estrada, Edith Lang-Laszlo and Victor Staub in Paris from 1933 to 1934.

== Career ==
Beauchamp-Huppé won a prize from the Canadian Institute of Music each year between 1930 and 1932 and earned the Prix de Paris in 1933. She was a soloist at a lecture-concert held at the Ritz-Carlton Montreal with the Canadian institute of Music's assistance and support in December 1932. The following year, Beauchamp-Huppé performed in a pianoforte recital at the Ritz-Carlton Montreal in her final Canadian appearance before leaving for Europe. When she returned to Canada, she gave recitals and performed the works of François Brassard, Alexis Contant, Mathieu, Miro and Georges Savaria among other Canadians as a soloist with orchestra on CBC Radio and CKAC. One such recital was Beauchamp-Huppé performing a programme of five Canadian pieces on the piano at the Montreal Tudor Hall in March 1936. She was the MSO's soloist in Les Djinns by César Franck in 1945 and accompanied Adrienne Roy-Vilandré in recording Popular Songs of French Canada. Beauchamp-Huppé also took up teaching, primarily at the Conservatoire de musique du Québec à Montréal.

== Personal life ==
She was married to Henri Huppé and she died in Montreal on March 10, 2007. On the morning of March 17, a funeral service was held for Beauchamp-Huppé at the Eglise St-Alphonse.

== Legacy ==
The Conservatoire de musique de Québec à Montréal inaugurated two accompaniment studios called the Studios Fleurette-Beauchamp-Huppé in Montreal and the other in Rimouski in recognition of Beauchamp-Huppé. In late 2008, her niece expressed a wish to make a substantial donation to the Conservatoire de musique du Québec à Montréal to establish the Bourse d'excellence Fleurette-Beauchamp-Huppé grant for a student aged 17 or over who had achieved "exceptional results in his studies at the Conservatory." The Archives Passe-Mémoire acquired the Fleurette Beauchamp-Huppé collection in 2011, which include her personal papers and objects connected to her private life and music career from 1924 to 2007.
