= Jeanne Maubourg =

Belgian opera singer

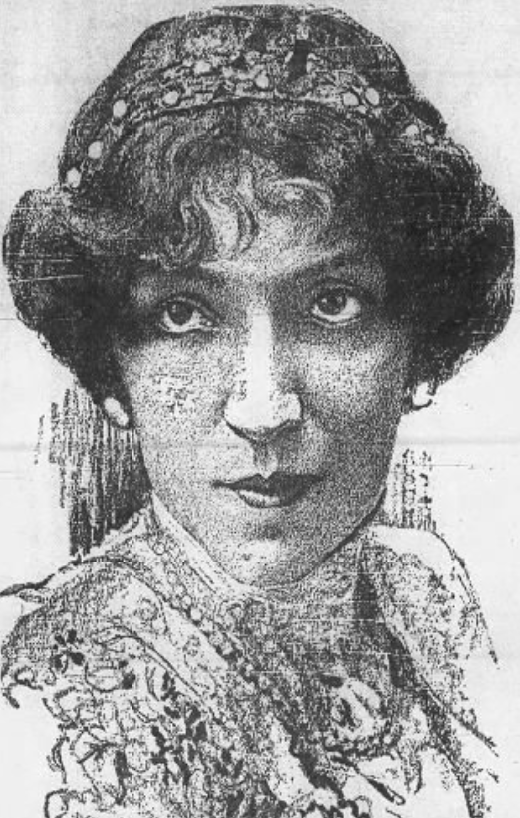
- Jeanne Maubourg, from a 1913 newspaper
- Born: Jeanne Elisabeth Goffaux; 10 November 1873; Namur, Belgium
- Died: 9 May 1953 (aged 79); Montreal, Quebec, Canada
- Occupations: Actress, singer, educator
- Spouse(s): Claude Bede Benedict; Albert Roberval; Auguste Aramini

Jeanne Maubourg (November 10, 1873 – 9 May 1953) was a Belgian operatic mezzo-soprano. She sang with the Metropolitan Opera in New York from 1909 to 1914, taught voice in Montreal, and was heard in Canadian radio dramas in the 1930s and 1940s.

== Early life ==
Jeanne Maubourg was born Jeanne Elisabeth Goffaux in Namur, the daughter of Alexis Hippolyte Goffaux, a musical conductor, and Marie Anne Nottet. (Her birth record gives 1873 as the date; most secondary sources give 1875 as the year.)

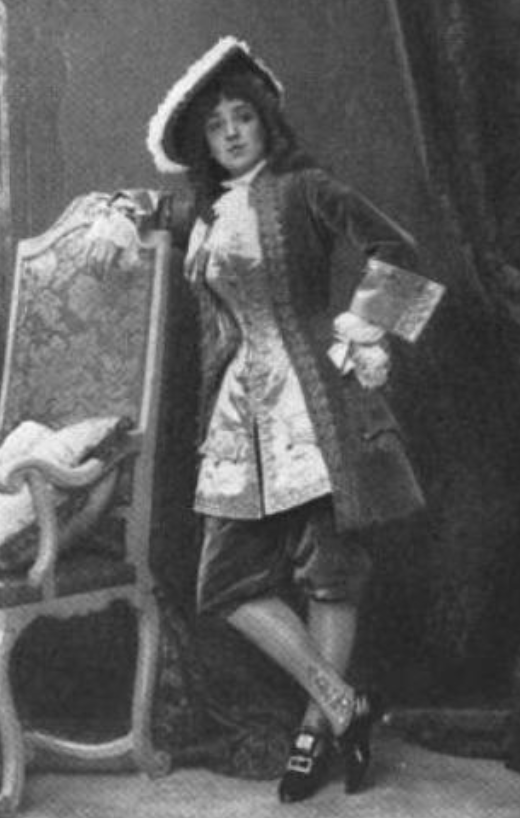
Jeanne Maubourg in costume, from a 1900 publication

== Career ==
Maubourg, a mezzo-soprano, began her opera career at the Théâtre de la Monnaie in 1897. She performed at London's Covent Garden for four seasons beginning in 1900. She was a member of the Metropolitan Opera from 1909 to 1914. She was in the cast when Arturo Toscanini conducted the American premiere of Gluck's Armide in 1910, sharing the stage with Enrico Caruso, Olive Fremstad, Louise Homer and Alma Gluck. She was also in the American premieres of Le donne curiose in 1912 and Boris Gudonov in 1913, both under Toscanini's baton. Her "large repertoire" also included roles in La Périchole, La bohème, Cavalleria rusticana, Carmen, Hansel and Gretel. Faust, Tales of Hoffmann, Coppélia, Falstaff, Manon Lescaut, Otello, La traviata, and Rigoletto. She sang in an operetta on Broadway, The Lilac Domino (1914–1915). She had a reputation for being an intelligent and good-natured performer.

In 1915 she joined the Chicago Opera for a year, and in 1916 she performed in Montreal, in Gillette de Narbonne. She stayed in Montreal, and she was a member of the Canadian Operetta Society from 1923. Maubourg taught voice students in Montreal, counting among her students Pierrette Alarie, Fleurette Beauchamp-Huppé, Estelle Mauffette, and Monique Leyrac. Film appearances by Maubourg included a role in Le Pére Chopin (1945). She hosted a program on Radio Canada, and acted in the longrunning radio dramas La Pension Velder (1938–1942) and Métropole (1943–1956).

== Personal life ==
Maubourg married three times. She married her first husband, French opera singer Claude Marie Bede Benedict, in 1911. They divorced in 1915. She married Canadian conductor Albert Roberval in 1918. She married French actor Auguste Aramini in 1947. She died in 1953, in Montreal, in her late seventies. There is a street named for her in her adopted city. Several recordings by Maubourg, from about 1917 and 1924, survive.
