= The New American Empire =

2004 book by Rodrigue Tremblay

- Author: Rodrigue Tremblay
- Language: English
- Genre: Non-fiction
- Publication date: 2004
- ISBN: 0-7414-1887-8

The New American Empire (2004; ISBN 0-7414-1887-8) is a geopolitical book by economist Rodrigue Tremblay that analyses the causes and consequences of the political shift taking place in U.S. foreign policy at the beginning of the 21st century.

The author discusses, from an international viewpoint, the reasons for the U.S.-led war in Iraq and why the United States now feels compelled to repudiate fifty years of multilateral cooperation in favor of a supremacist and unilateral approach to world affairs.

The book considers such topics as "Religion and politics";- "The ideological foundation of the new U.S. imperial doctrine";- Parallels between "Iraq and Kosovo";- "The Just War Theory";- "Bush and international law";- "The Project for the New American Century" and the neo-conservative agenda;- "Parallel between the Bush Doctrine and the (1968) Brezhnev Doctrine; - "Leaders against war";- "The 600-year megacycle of empires"; and, "Religion and Western civilization".

The New American Empire is divided into four parts, analyzing the strategic causes behind the 2003 Iraq War and its consequences: first, the role played by politics and religion; second, the role played by oil and military strategy; third, how the Bush Doctrine as a blueprint for U. S. world hegemony conflicts with international law; and, how the very long cycle of empires may be getting close to the end for the Western world.

There exist versions in English, French and Turkish of this book.
