= Auguste Aramini =

Canadian opera singer

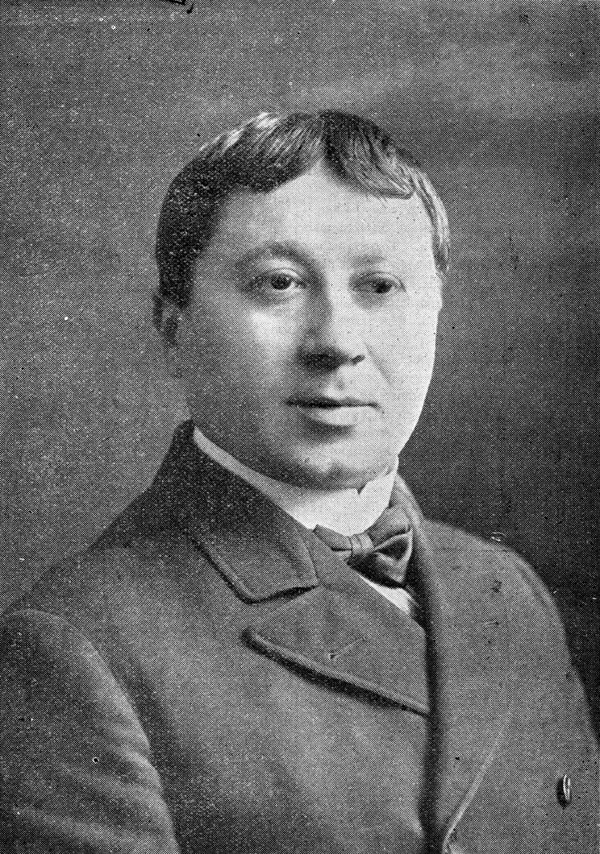
Auguste Aramini

Auguste Aramini (14 May 1875 – 27 May 1950) was a French-born Canadian singer.

Aramini was born in Agen, France. He is thought to have emigrated to Canada as a singer in the theatre performance company of René Harmant (fl. 1897–1912), who arrived in Canada in 1897. While in Montreal, he made several recordings for the Berliner label, including Faut te faire vacciner and Adieux d'amants. In 1905, the Ligues de Vertu à Montréal applied pressure to the theatre industry of Montreal to stop the display of questionable morality, they say, in the current theatre. Harmant's company departed for New York that year, and Aramini accompanied them.

In 1947, he married Belgian opera singer and radio actress Jeanne Maubourg in Montreal.
