= Refus Global =

1948 Québécois manifesto

Le Refus global (English: Total Refusal) was an anti-establishment and anti-religious manifesto released on August 9, 1948, in Montreal by a group of sixteen young Québécois artists and intellectuals that included Paul-Émile Borduas, Jean-Paul Riopelle and Françoise Sullivan.

Le Refus Global originated from a group called Les Automatistes, led by Paul-Émile Borduas. This group created abstract paintings inspired by French surrealists of the time and scorned all academic teaching available at the time in Quebec. The signatories were also highly influenced by French poet André Breton's stream-of-consciousness style and extolled the creative force of the subconscious.

Le Refus Global was a manifesto that completely rejected the social, artistic and psychological norms and values of Québécois society at the time. Calling for "an untamed need for liberation," the manifesto cried out for "resplendent anarchy" and criticized the "cassocks that have remained the sole repositories of faith, knowledge, truth, and national wealth." Pierre Gauvreau, one of the signatories, said that the main message of the manifesto is that "God does not exist." Jean Paul Riopelle, who also signed the document, interviewed later, said it was "written by Borduas...to reject those conditions, both material and intellectual, that had been our lot up to that point". Of the 400 published copies of Le Refus Global, selling for a dollar apiece, only about half of them were sold. Notwithstanding, this manifesto caused an uproar, and as a result of this manifesto, Borduas lost his job at the École du Meuble de Montréal. Later, the manifesto was translated into different languages and was read in America and Europe.

It has been said by commentators that from the publication of this manifesto, "modern French Canada began", while CBC calls it "one of the most important and controversial artistic and social documents in modern Quebec society". Along with the publication of Les insolences du Frère Untel (the Insolences of Brother So-and-so), the asbestos miners' strike of 1949, and the Maurice Richard Riot of 1955, Le Refus Global is widely seen to have been one of the precursors to the Quiet Revolution.

== The document ==
The publication contained a series of texts in addition to the manifesto, as well as illustrations and photographs. Four hundred copies were published.

Table of contents of the collection
Cover: text by Claude Gauvreau, drawing by Jean-Paul Riopelle
1. Paul-Émile Borduas	"Refus global"
2. Paul-Émile Borduas	"En regard du surréalisme actuel"
3. Paul-Émile Borduas	"Commentaires sur des mots courants"
4. Claude Gauvreau	"Au cœur des quenouilles"
5. Claude Gauvreau	"Bien-être"
6. Claude Gauvreau	"L'ombre sur le cerceau"
7. Bruno Cormier	"L'œuvre picturale est une expérience"
8. Françoise Sullivan	"La danse et l'espoir"
9. Fernand Leduc	"Qu'on le veuille ou non..."

== Signatories ==
- Paul-Émile Borduas
- Madeleine Arbour
- Marcel Barbeau
- Bruno Cormier
- Claude Gauvreau
- Pierre Gauvreau
- Muriel Guilbault
- Marcelle Ferron
- Fernand Leduc
- Thérèse Leduc
- Jean-Paul Mousseau
- Maurice Perron
- Louise Renaud
- Françoise Riopelle
- Jean Paul Riopelle
- Françoise Sullivan

It was signed by 15 artists, including eight men and seven women, an unusually high proportion of women for the time period.

However, not all signatories had the same perspective on the Automatist ideology. Some, such as Pierre Gauvreau and Riopelle, wanted to catch up to Europe artistically, while others, such as Borduas and Claude Gauvreau, wanted to push the project even farther, for Quebec to rid itself of the image of a "poor little population" in the process of decolonization." They were calling not only for a radical artistic movement but for a radical social movement as well. Claude Gauvreau was particularly influenced by the precursors of surrealists and pre-surrealists. He also wrote his first poetry collection, Étal mixte, just after his discovery of Vingt-Cinq poèmes by Tzara. In Quebec, unlike Europe, automatism was better understood by everyday people while being snubbed by the elite, making it more of a movement for the democratization of art.

== Context and follow-up ==
In the late 1940s, Automatism in Quebec quietly established itself, influenced by the works of Nietzsche and Freud. Borduas, however, did not associate with any party, and was considered an anarchist, with Refus Global being a comment on the decadence of Christian civilization.

Refus Global scandalized authorities and the press, who condemned and censored a large part of the manifesto. Borduas lost his job as a professor at the École du Meuble de Montréal, a position that he had occupied since 1937, and he went into exile in the United States. Besides this, however, the manifesto did not cause much immediate disruption due to the near total absence of mass media such as television.

Marcel Barbeau, in the documentary Les Enfants de Refus global, would go on to explain that Refus Global was not a well-delineated social movement, but rather a manifesto against a very closed social structure. Only later would Refus Global come to be associated with the social-democratic and nationalist movements. In the 1980s, a period where Quebec was striving to clarify its identity and political autonomy, Borduas was perceived as a hero, saving the cultural integrity of the French Canadian population. Since then, Refus Global has become a reference for the idea that the Grande Noirceur had not drowned out all innovative intellectual life in Quebec; as a result, it is seen as a precursor to the Quiet Revolution.

Fifty years later, the interpretation of Refus Global in the intellectual history of Quebec continues to be the subject of reflections. In 1998, the Condorcet Prize was given to all the signatories of Refus Global. That same year, Manon Barbeau released the film Les Enfants de Refus Global.

== See also ==
- Les Automatistes
- Marcelle Ferron
- Canadian Art
