= News from the Republic of Letters =

Literary magazine

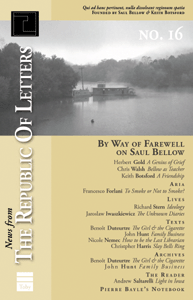
- Editor: Keith Botsford
- Categories: Literary magazine
- Frequency: Quarterly
- Founder: Saul Bellow, Keith Botsford
- First issue: 1997
- Company: Republic of Letters
- Country: Costa Rica
- Based in: Cahuita
- Language: English
- Website: mag.trolbooks.com
- ISSN: 1095-1644

News from the Republic of Letters is the third magazine collaboration between Saul Bellow and Keith Botsford, following Noble Savage and ANON. The journal, originally based in Boston and later operated from the editor's home in Costa Rica, publishes new and newly discovered writings from American and international writers. The magazine appears twice a year. Readers can purchase one issue at a time or a subscription of four issues. It first appeared in 1997 in newsprint form. Issues between 2003 and 2008 were published as bound editions. The publication of No. 19 was printed by the London-based publisher Sylph Editions. The journal has returned to broadsheet format.

The contents of TRoL fall into several categories. TEXTS are works of fiction or non-fiction of varying lengths. Articles are written in English or translated into English from any other language. LIVES are memoirs, correspondence, biography and autobiography. ARIAS, a unique category, are personal statements and brief essays without restriction of subject. MUSIC, ART, BOOKS comprise intelligent work on any aspect of the arts. Works in the ARCHIVES are selected by the editor to introduce readers to undeservedly lesser-known writers from previous generations. POETRY includes both original verses and work from translations. Reviews and critical essays appear under NEW FICTION and as a part of P.B.'s NOTEBOOK, a column written by Mr. Botsford in the spirit of enlightenment philosopher and writer Pierre Bayle. In 1684 Bayle began the publication of his Nouvelles de la république des lettres, after which TRoL takes its name.

Another unique feature has been the inclusion in newsprint issues of French-style pamphlets, which readers tear from the other pages and fold and cut themselves into small booklets. "Salido" by Louis Guilloux appears in this form in No.2, as does "O Brother!" by Mr. Botsford in No.3.

TRoL is distinguished by its international character and the publication of unknown authors alongside those of accomplished authors. The name of the magazine references the network of literary and political correspondence which united prominent thinkers across Europe during the Enlightenment:

The Republic of Letters is of very ancient origin ... It embraces the whole world and is composed of all nationalities, all social classes, all ages and both sexes ... All languages, ancient as well as modern, are spoken. The arts are joined to letters, and artisans have their place in it; but its religion is not uniform, and its manners (as in all republics) are a mixture of good and bad. Piety and licentiousness are both to be found ... Praise and honor are awarded by popular acclaim. (M. de Vigneul-Marville, 1699)

In a 1999 interview with The New York Times Mr. Bellow explained his motivation for the magazine:

One early reader wrote that our paper, "with its contents so fresh, person-to-person", was "real, non-synthetic, undistracting." Noting that there were no ads, she asked, "Is it possible, can it last?" and called it "an antidote to the shrinking of the human being in every one of us." And toward the end of her letter our correspondent added, "It behooves the elder generation to come up with reminders of who we used to be and need to be." This is what Keith Botsford and I had hoped that our "tabloid for literates" would be. And for two years it has been just that. We are a pair of utopian codgers who feel we have a duty to literature.,

== See also ==
- List of literary magazines
