= Le Groupe Dance Lab =

Former contemporary dance research centre

Le Groupe Dance Lab (formerly Le Groupe de la Place Royale) was a contemporary dance research centre formed in Montreal in 1966 as a dance company. It re-located to Ottawa in 1977 and changed its name and artistic mission in 1988. It closed its doors in 2009. The Dance Lab was founded by Jeanne Renaud and the main (and original) Artistic Director was Peter Boneham.
