= Keith Botsford =

American novelist

Keith Botsford (March 29, 1928 – August 19, 2018) was an American/European writer, professor emeritus at Boston University and editor of News from the Republic of Letters.

== Biography ==
Keith Botsford was born in Brussels, Belgium of an expatriate American father and an Italian mother. His mother (1897–1994) was born Carolina Elena Rangoni-Machiavelli-Publicola-Santacroce, 2nd. daughter of the Marchesa Alda Rangoni. He grew up in a trilingual house, and was educated in English boarding schools. His father returned to the United States early in 1939, and together with his mother and brother, the Botsfords were expelled from Italy on the outbreak of World War II.

From then on, Botsford was educated in California, and, after 1941, at Portsmouth Abbey in New England. He was briefly attracted to the monastic life, but then continued his education at Yale University, leaving in 1946 to enlist in the US Army, where he served in counter-intelligence. He finished his formal university education at the University of Iowa (A.B., 1950) and at Yale with a Master's in French Literature (A.M., 1952).

Botsford then went on to study composition at the Manhattan School of Music, Japanese at Columbia University, and law at Holborn College in London. He was attracted to music and composed a number of chamber works, a ballet, choral music and part-songs. With John Houseman, he worked in film, theater and television.

Botsford's academic career, often combined with administrative tasks, began at Bard College in 1953, where he met his lifelong friend Saul Bellow. In 1958, after two years in Europe living off translation, Botsford became assistant to the Rector of the University of Puerto Rico, taught Comparative Literature, founded the Honors Program and directed the University of Puerto Rico's television program.

In 1962, Botsford was invited by his University of Iowa friend, John Hunt, to join the Congress for Cultural Freedom. He worked with the Congress for Cultural Freedom spending three years in Latin America, based in Rio de Janeiro and Mexico City.

In 1965, he moved back to England to become Deputy International Secretary of International P.E.N., where he organized the Bled Round Tables, the first to which Soviet writers were invited.

After serving at P.E.N., Botsford was invited to become the Director of the Ford Foundation's National Translation Center at the University of Texas, Austin (1965–1970), where he also was Professor of English.

In 1971, Botsford returned to England, where he began a 20-year career as a sports journalist with The Sunday Times. He also became a Feature Writer and columnist on Gastronomy for The Independent, which he joined in its first week. Botsford was also a features writer and U.S. correspondent for the Italian newspaper La Stampa and also wrote about foreign affairs for Limes.

By the late 1970s, Botsford had combined his journalism with a post as Professor of Journalism and Lecturer in History at Boston University and a position as Assistant to the President John Silber.

Botsford retired as professor emeritus at Boston University in 2006. He lived his last years in Costa Rica in a RIBA Award-winning house on the Caribbean coast, designed by his architect son, Gianni Botsford.

Botsford had eight living children and sixteen grandchildren. He enjoyed smoking cigarettes and had been a pipe smoker.

Botsford died in Battersea, England, in August 2018.

== As a novelist ==
Botsford's work as a novelist is divided into two periods: the first four novels – The Master Race [1955], The Eighth-best-dressed-Man in the World [1957], Benvenuto [1961] and The March-Man [1964] – were either semi-autobiographical or political in nature; his later books (after he returned to fiction in 1989) include three major autobiographical works: O Brother! [2000], The Mothers [2002], and Death and the Maiden [2007] form a coherent trilogy about his brother, his early wives (and mothers) and, in the last, a reprise of The March-Man, his father. During this second period he also published a series of stories and novellas, described as "imaginary biographies", collected in Out of Nowhere [2000]. At the same time he also wrote five non-fiction books on sporting figures and four crime and espionage novels under the pseudonym I.I. Magdalen.

== Awards ==
Botsford received grants from the Rockefeller Foundation and Moody Foundation, and a prize from the American Translators Association.

== Published works ==
=== Books ===
- Jozef Czapski: A Life in Translation (The Cahier Series, vol.10. Sylph Editions, June, 2009)
- Collaboration (2007)
- Death and the Maiden (2007)
- Emma H. (Toby Press, 2003)
- The Mothers (Toby Press, 2002)
- Lennie & Vance & Benji (Toby Press, 2002)
- Editors: The Best of Five Decades (Toby Press, 2001) edited by Keith Botsford and Saul Bellow
- Out of Nowhere (Toby Press, 2000)
- The Champions of Formula 1 (Arrow Books Ltd., 1989)
- Keke, (Hutchinson, May 1985)
- Ana P. (Toby Press, 1983)
- The Search for Anderson or Anderson Minor (St. Martins Press, 1982)
- Driving Ambition (Atheneum, 1981) by Keith Botsford and Alan Jones
- Dominguin: Spain's Greatest Bullfighter (Quadrangle Books, 1972)
- The March-Man (Viking, 1964)
- Benvenuto (Hutchinson, 1961)
- The Eighth-Best Dressed Man in the World (Harcourt, Brace, and Co., 1957)
- The Master Race (Wingate,1955)

=== Short stories ===
- “Francoise” (Toby Press, 2000)
- “Mister Zeiss” (Toby Press, 2000)
- “Grievances” (Toby Press, 2000)
- “The Town of Luck” (Grand Street Magazine, no. 52, p178)
- “Along the River Plate” (Toby Press, 2000)
- “Olga & Snow” (Toby Press, 2000)
- “O Brother” (Toby Press, 2000)

=== Articles ===
- "Reflexions on Kennedy," Kolokol: Grafica Panamericana(Mexico), January 25, 1964.
- "Mexico Follows a 'Solo Camino'," New York Times, April 26, 1964.
- "'There is No Censorship,' Said Poland's Censor: Report From a Surrealist Capital,"New York Times, September 11, 1966.
- "Why Students in France Go Communist; Elite Proletarians All," New York Times, November 13, 1966.
- "If Les Mao Won Their Revolution, They Would Immediately Start Another Maoist Cause Celebre,"New York Times, September 17, 1972.
- "Look Who's in Bed with Whom: Decision in France," New York Times, March 4, 1973.
- "The White Rolls-Royce: Stars Beyond the Firmament," New York Times, March 25, 1973.
- "The Music and the Man: Hindemith," New York Times, November 27, 1977.
- "A God Who Made Words," New York Times, December 27, 1981.
- "The Pollini Sound," New York Times, March 1, 1987.
- "Maverick Violinist," New York Times, October 2, 1988.
- "Symposium: Who Are the Five Most Underrated and/or Overrated Musicians, and Why?" Boulevard, Fall 2010, Vol. 25, nos. 2 and 3.

=== Translations ===
- Sixth Form 1939, by Marcella Olschki. Publisher: Toby Press, August 2002, 72 pages translated by Keith Botsford.
- Women and Faith: Catholic Religious Life in Italy from Late Antiquity to the Present, by Lucetta Scaraffia. Publisher Harvard University Press, November 1, 1999, 432 pages, translated by Keith Botsford.
- The Sacralization of Politics in Fascist Italy, by Emilio Gentile. Publisher Harvard University Press, September 1, 1996, 222 pages, translated by Keith Botsford.
- The House of Others, by Silvio D'Arzo. Publisher Marlboro Press, October 15, 1995, 125 pages, translated by Keith Botsford.
- Inevitable Illusions: How Mistakes of Reason Rule Our Minds, by Massimo Piattelli-Palmarini. Publisher: John Wiley & Sons Inc., October 20, 1994, 256 pages, translated by Keith Botsford.
- History of the French Revolution: Volume IV, Books 7–8, by Jules Michelet. Publisher: Livingston Publishing, 1972, translated by Keith Botsford
- History of the French Revolution: Volume VI, Books 11, 12 13, by Jules Michelet. Publisher: Livingston Publishing, 1983, translated by Keith Botsford
- History of the French Revolution: Volume VII, Books 14, 15 16, 17, by Jules Michelet. Publisher: Livingston Publishing, 1973, translated by Keith Botsford
- Human Relations Area Files (anthropology) 1958–1960, eight books manly on Viet Nam, translated by Keith Botsford

=== Book introduction ===
Ceremony in Lone Tree, by Wright Morris. Publisher: Bison Books, September 1, 2001, 304 pages. Introduction by Keith Botsford

== Magazines ==
Founding editor

- Delos
- Kolokol

Co-founding editors Keith Botsford & Saul Bellow

- ANON
- The Noble Savage
- News from The Republic of Letters

Editor

Bostonia, Poetry New York, Grand Prix International, Yale Poetry Review

Contributing editor

Leviathan, Stand, The Warwick Review
