= Henriette Fauteux-Massé =

Canadian painter

Henriette Fauteux-Massé (October 30, 1924 – March 5, 2005) was a Canadian painter who lived in Quebec.

She was born in Coaticook and was first interested in dance. She later began painting, being largely self-taught. She visited New York City three times between 1946 and 1948, talking to artists and visiting museums. In 1951, she received a scholarship from the Quebec government which allowed her to study in Paris with André Lhote. She was known for her abstracts, landscapes and portraits. She participated in a number of shows in Quebec and in Paris. Fauteux-Massé was a founding member of the Conseil de la peinture and a member of the Non-Figurative Artists' Association of Montreal and the Société des artistes professionels du Québec.

Scholar Sandra Paikowsky says: "Fauteux-Massé’s work has a particular elegance that derives from its sense of restraint and composure, but also from an undercurrent of whimsy that discloses the sensuousness of the impastoed surface and its rhythmic brush marks."

She received first prize at the International Painting Competition in Granby.

Fauteux-Massé died in Sainte-Adèle at the age of 80.

Her work is held in the collections of the National Gallery of Canada and the Musée national des beaux-arts du Québec.
