= Prix Condorcet =

Prix Condorcet was instituted in 1993, by the Mouvement laïque québécois to honour a public personality who had worked for the defense of secularity and freedom of thought. The name honours the Marquis de Condorcet, a philosopher of the Age of Enlightenment and one of the writers of the Declaration of the Rights of Man and of the Citizen.

- 1993: Micheline Trudel, voluntary.
- 1994: Henry Morgentaler, defender of the right to abortion in Canada.
- 1995: Centrale des syndicats du Québec, trade union of teachers.
- 1996: Louise Laurin, founder of the Coalition for the deconfessionnalisation of the school system.
- 1997: Institut canadien de Montréal, liberal and anticlerical organization (1844-1880).
- 1998: All signatories of Refus Global.
- 1999: Duplessis Orphans Association.
- 2000: Jacques Hébert, senator and humanist of secularity.
- 2001: Pierre Bourgault, founder of Rassemblement pour l'Indépendance Nationale and free-thinker.
- 2002: Jacques Godbout and Jacques Mackay, former presidents of the Mouvement laïque de langue Française (MLF).
- 2003: Janette Bertrand, playwright.
- 2004: Rodrigue Tremblay, economist, politician and humanist.
- 2005: Paul Bégin, deputy and republican partisan.
- 2006: Daniel Baril, journalist and anthropologist, founder member and former president of the MLQ.
- 2007: Yolande Geadah, essayist, public debater over immigration and religious issues.
