= Jack Ludwig =

Canadian writer (1922–2018)

- Born: Jack Barry Ludwig; 30 August 1922; Winnipeg, Manitoba
- Died: 12 February 2018 (aged 95)
- Education: University of Manitoba; University of California, Los Angeles
- Writing career
- Language: English
- Period: 1960s–1970s
- Genres: novels, short stories, non-fiction
- Notable works: Above Ground, The Great American Spectaculars: The Kentucky Derby, Mardi Gras, and Other Days of Celebration

Jack Barry Ludwig (August 30, 1922 – February 12, 2018) was a Canadian-born American-resident novelist, short story writer, and sportswriter.

Born and raised in the Jewish Canadian community of Winnipeg, Manitoba, Ludwig was educated at the University of Manitoba, graduating with a Bachelor of Arts in 1944, and the University of California, Los Angeles, earning his Ph.D. in 1953. He remained a resident of the United States for most of his adult life, holding teaching positions at institutions such as the University of Minnesota and the State University of New York at Stony Brook. He was a friend and acolyte of Saul Bellow early in his career, although this relationship was damaged by his extramarital affair with Bellow's then-wife Sondra; He was the basis of the character Valentine Gersbach in Bellow's novel Herzog.

Ludwig's novels include Confusions (1963), Above Ground (1968), and A Woman of Her Age (1973). Above Ground, a thinly veiled response to his portrayal in Herzog, was later reprinted as part of McClelland & Stewart's New Canadian Library series. He also published numerous short stories in literary magazines, although he never published a collection of his short stories in book form.

Ludwig was well regarded for his journalism, which concentrated almost exclusively on sportswriting following the publication of Hockey Night in Moscow in 1972, and the subject of a chapter in Graeme Gibson's 1973 non-fiction work Eleven Canadian Novelists.

== Works ==
- Confusions (1963)
- Above Ground (1968)
- Hockey Night in Moscow (1972)
- A Woman of Her Age (1973)
- The Great Hockey Thaw; or, The Russians Are Here! (1974)
- Five Ring Circus: The Montreal Olympics (1976)
- Games of Fear and Winning: Sports with an Inside View (1976)
- The Great American Spectaculars: The Kentucky Derby, Mardi Gras, and Other Days of Celebration (1976)
