= Roger Fauteux =

Canadian artist (1923–2021)

Roger Fauteux (13 December 1923 – 29 April 2021) was a Canadian artist, who was a member of the Quebec artistic dissident group Les Automatistes in the late 1940s. However, he was not a signatory to the group's manifesto, Refus global. Fauteux died in Granby on April 29, 2021, at the age of 97.

== See also ==
- Les Automatistes
