= Peter Boneham =

American choreographer, dance educator and artistic director

Peter Boneham (born November 7, 1934) is an American-born Canadian choreographer, dance educator and artistic director. To date, he has been the longest serving artistic director for a Canadian contemporary dance company.

He was born in Rochester, New York, trained in ballet at the Eastman School of Music and performed with various companies in New York City, including the American Ballet Theatre, the Metropolitan Opera Ballet and the William Dollar Concert Ballet Group. In 1964, he came to Montreal to join Les Grands Ballets Canadiens. In 1966, he joined Le Groupe de la Place Royale, the first professional contemporary dance company in Canada, as assistant director. In 1971, he became artistic director for the company, which moved to Ottawa in 1977. Le Groupe performed works by Boneham and other Canadian choreographers. In 1988, the company changed its name and its focus to become Le Groupe Dance Lab, a dance laboratory where new choreographers could develop. Le Groupe Dance Lab closed in 2009. Boneham had stepped down as artistic director in July the year before after naming a successor.

He received the Jean A. Chalmers Award for Creativity in Dance in 1991, the Dance Ontario Award in 1992 and the Victor Tolgyesy Award in 1996. Boneham was given a Governor General's Performing Arts Award for lifetime achievement in 2005. He was named to the Order of Canada in 2008.

In 2010, a book Peter in Process: Peter Boneham’s Sixty Years in Dance by Canadian writer Sara Porter was published by Dance Collection Danse.
