= Pierre Gauvreau =

Canadian painter and writer

- Born: Pierre Saint-Mars Gauvreau; 23 August 1922; Montreal, Quebec, Canada
- Died: 7 April 2011 (aged 88)
- Education: l'École des beaux-arts de Montréal
- Known for: Painter
- Spouse(s): Madeline Arbour, Janine Carreau

Pierre Saint-Mars Gauvreau (23 August 1922 – 7 April 2011) was a Canadian painter and writer who also worked in film and television production.

== Career ==
He was born in Montreal, and enrolled at the École des Beaux-Arts de Montréal in 1937, today part of UQAM. He became a member of the Contemporary Art Society in 1939. Gauvreau served overseas with the Canadian Army and on his return to Montreal, went back to the École des Beaux-Arts for two more years of study. He was associated with Quebec artistic dissident group Les Automatistes, showing his work in the first Automatist exhibition in Canada in 1946. The second Automatist show took place in his mother's apartment, the home he shared with his brother, Claude Gauvreau, a writer, and it was at this exhibition that the group was first referred to as the Automatistes. He became a signatory to the Refus global manifesto, which he typed and printed in his apartment. The publication contained reproductions of his recent paintings. In 1961, he helped found The Non-Figurative Artists' Association of Montreal.

Gauvreau worked in various aspects of television production during the 1950s. He was best known in French-Canada for his popular series, Temps d'une paix. During a stint at the National Film Board, he also produced Claude Jutra's 1971 classic film Mon oncle Antoine. He took a break from painting during the 1960s until 1975. In the 1990s he began experimenting with new techniques, including spray paint. He continued to paint in 2005, true to his Automatist beginnings. His work has been described as gestural and calligraphic and his later work as looking lace-like. Selected collections include the National Gallery of Canada, Ottawa; the Montreal Museum of Fine Arts; the Musée national des beaux-arts du Québec, Québec; and many other galleries, including the Robert McLaughlin Gallery, Oshawa.

Gauvreau's career was the subject of a Charles Binamé documentary, l'obligation de la liberté, and a biography. One of his works, The Bottom of the Closet, was reproduced on a 45-cent postage stamp in 1998 for a set of seven stamps for the Automatistes.

Gauvreau died on 7 April 2011 of heart failure at the age of 88.

== Awards and recognition ==
- 1990: Prix Gemeaux, Grand Prix for his film and television work
- 1995: le Prix Louis-Philippe-Hébert

== See also ==
- Claude Gauvreau
- Pierre Henry (painter)

== Bibliography ==
- Duffy, Helen (1979). Oeuvres de Pierre Gauvreau. Montreal: Musée d`art contemporain de Montreal.
