= Claude Gauvreau =

Canadian writer

- Born: 19 August 1925; Montreal, Quebec, Canada
- Died: July 7, 1971 (aged 45); Montreal, Quebec, Canada
- Known for: Literature (Poetry, Drama, Prose, Essays), Painting
- Movement: Automatist

Claude Gauvreau (August 19, 1925 in Montreal, Quebec, Canada – July 7, 1971 in Montreal) was a playwright, poet, sound poet, and polemicist. He was a member of the radical Automatist movement and a contributor to the revolutionary Refus Global Manifesto.

== Life and career ==
Gauvreau pursued classical studies at the Collège Sainte-Marie, and graduated with a B.A in Philosophy from Université de Montréal.

He discovered modern art through his brother Pierre, who attended l'École des beaux-arts, and met painter Paul-Émile Borduas, leader of Les Automatistes. He then became an unconditional advocate of the Automatist Movement of the Montreal Surrealists, and, in 1948 contributed to the Refus Global ("Total Refusal") Manifesto, which would become a key document of Quebec and Canadian cultural history.

Between 1944 and 1947, he wrote Les Entrailles, a collection of 26 short plays or "dramatic objects". In 1947, he staged one of these plays, Bien-être, with his muse, actress Muriel Guilbault.

Following Muriel Guilbault's suicide in 1952, Gauvreau's fragile emotional stability caused him to be institutionalized ten times over eight years in Montreal psychiatric hospital Saint-Jean-de-Dieu. He continued to write, though. While working for the radio, between 1952 and 1969, he wrote several of his best known works, beginning with Beauté baroque (1952), a novel depicting the life of Muriel, as well as several collections of poems, including Sur fil métamorphose (1956), Brochuges (1956), and Étal Mixte (1968). In 1958, two of Gauvreau's short plays were performed at École des beaux-arts: La jeune fille et la lune and Les grappes lucides.

In 1956, at a time he believed he would die, Gauvreau wrote his best-known work, La charge de l'orignal épormyable (The Charge of the Expormidable Moose).

Set in a vaguely institutional communal home, the play revolves around Mycroft Mixeudeim, a poet who is envied, plagiarized, mocked and ultimately sacrificed by his fellow housemates. When the play finally premiered in 1970 at Le Gésu in Montreal, the production closed after only a few performances as a result of poor planning and sheer lack of audience. But three years after Gauvreau's death, in 1974, the play received a successful production at Théâtre du Nouveau Monde, and went on to receive several more productions over time in Quebec, as well as a television adaptation for Radio-Canada Television in 1992.

On March 27, 1970, he participated to La Nuit de la poésie, the largest poetry festival in the history of Quebec. On July 7, 1971, Gauvreau fell to his death from the roof of his building. While some considered his death to be a suicide, the coroner ruled the death accidental.

Gauvreau's final full-length play, Les oranges sont vertes, premiered posthumously in 1972 at Théâtre du Nouveau Monde, and six years after his death, in 1977, Gauvreau's Complete Creative Works, containing over 1,500 pages of his poetry, prose and drama, was published in Montreal.

Gauvreau invented vocabulary through his own form of sound poetry, creating what he called explorean language. His life and work influenced a new generation of Canadian artists, including performance poets The Four Horsemen.

== Works ==
=== In English translation ===

- The Vampire and the Nymphomaniac / Le vampire et la nymphomane (1949), bilingual edition, translated by Ray Ellenwood. Toronto: One Little Goat Theatre Company, 2022. ISBN 9781775325567 The Vampire at Canadian Play Outlet
- The Charge of the Expormidable Moose (La charge de l'orignal épormyable), translated by Ray Ellenwood. Toronto: Exile Editions, 1996. ISBN 9781550961812
- Entrails (Entrailles - a collection of 26 "dramatic objects" by Claude Gauvreau, 1948), translated by Ray Ellenwood. Coach House Books, 1981, ISBN 9780889102248, Toronto: Exile Editions, 1991. ISBN 9781550960266
- The Lucid Clusters: Poetics of Claude Gauvreau, translated, and with an introduction by, Ray Ellenwood. Calgary: no press, 2011

=== In French ===
- Le vampire et la nymphomane / The Vampire and the Nymphomaniac (1949), publication bilingue. Toronto: One Little Goat Theatre Company, 2022. ISBN 9781775325567
- Les entrailles (1948), édition par Thierry Bissonnette. Bromont, Québec: Éditions de la Grenouillère, 2022. ISBN 9782924758809
- Oeuvres créatrices complètes (Complete Creative Works), Ottawa: Parti pris, 1977.
  - ISBN 9780885120703
  - Link to the 1991 edition
- List of Gauvreau's works via French Wikipedia
