= Paul-Émile Borduas =

Canadian artist (1905–1960)

- Born: November 1, 1905; Saint-Hilaire, Quebec, Canada
- Died: February 22, 1960 (aged 54); Paris, France
- Education: Ateliers d'Art Sacré
- Known for: Painter
- Movement: Les Automatistes

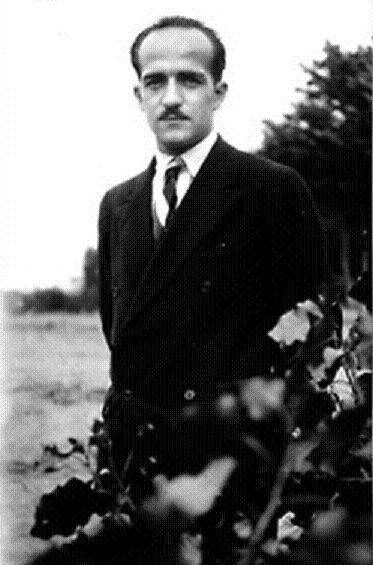
Paul-Émile Borduas

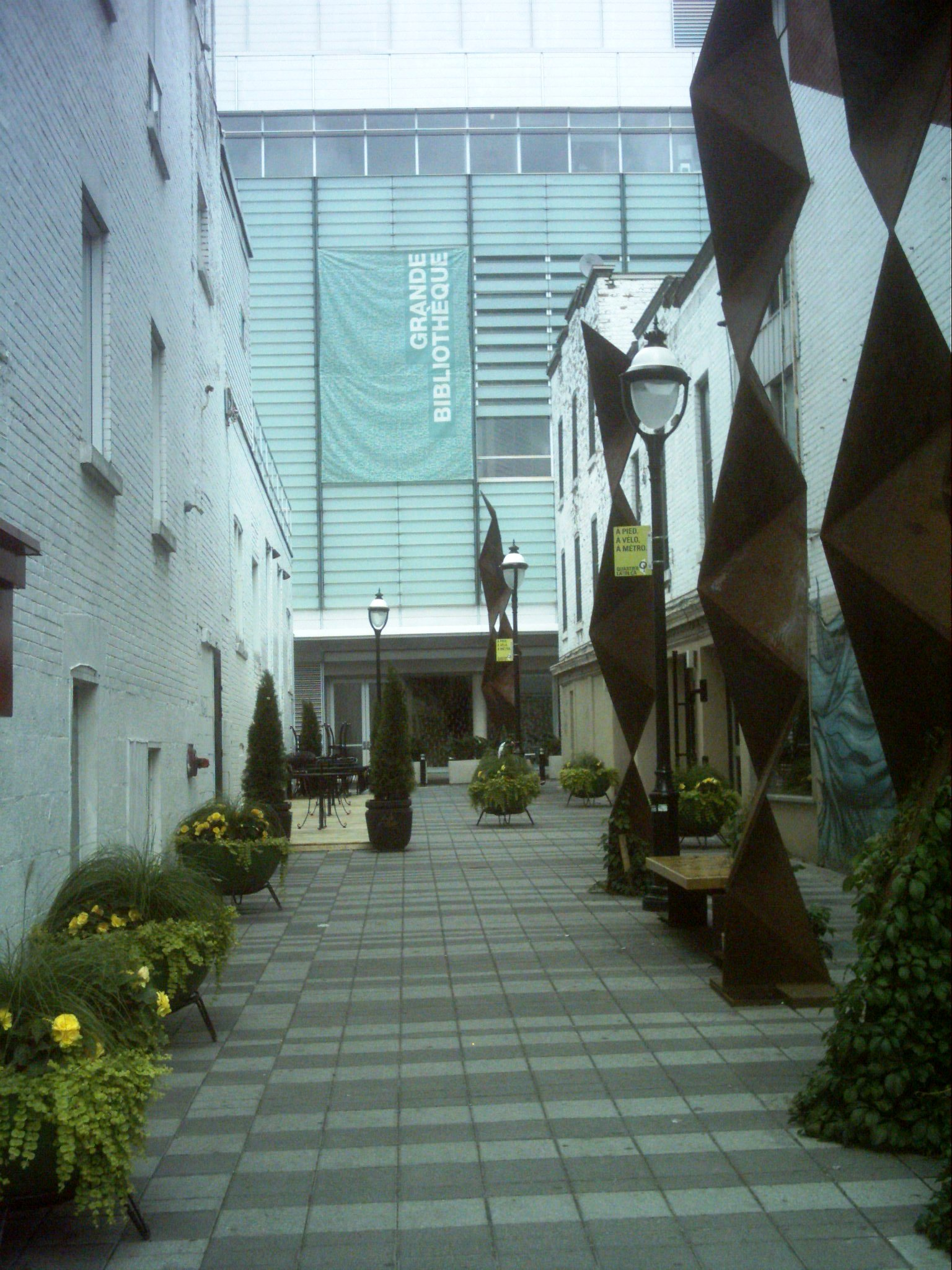
Place Paul-Émile Borduas seen from rue Saint-Denis, ending at the National Library and Archives of Quebec

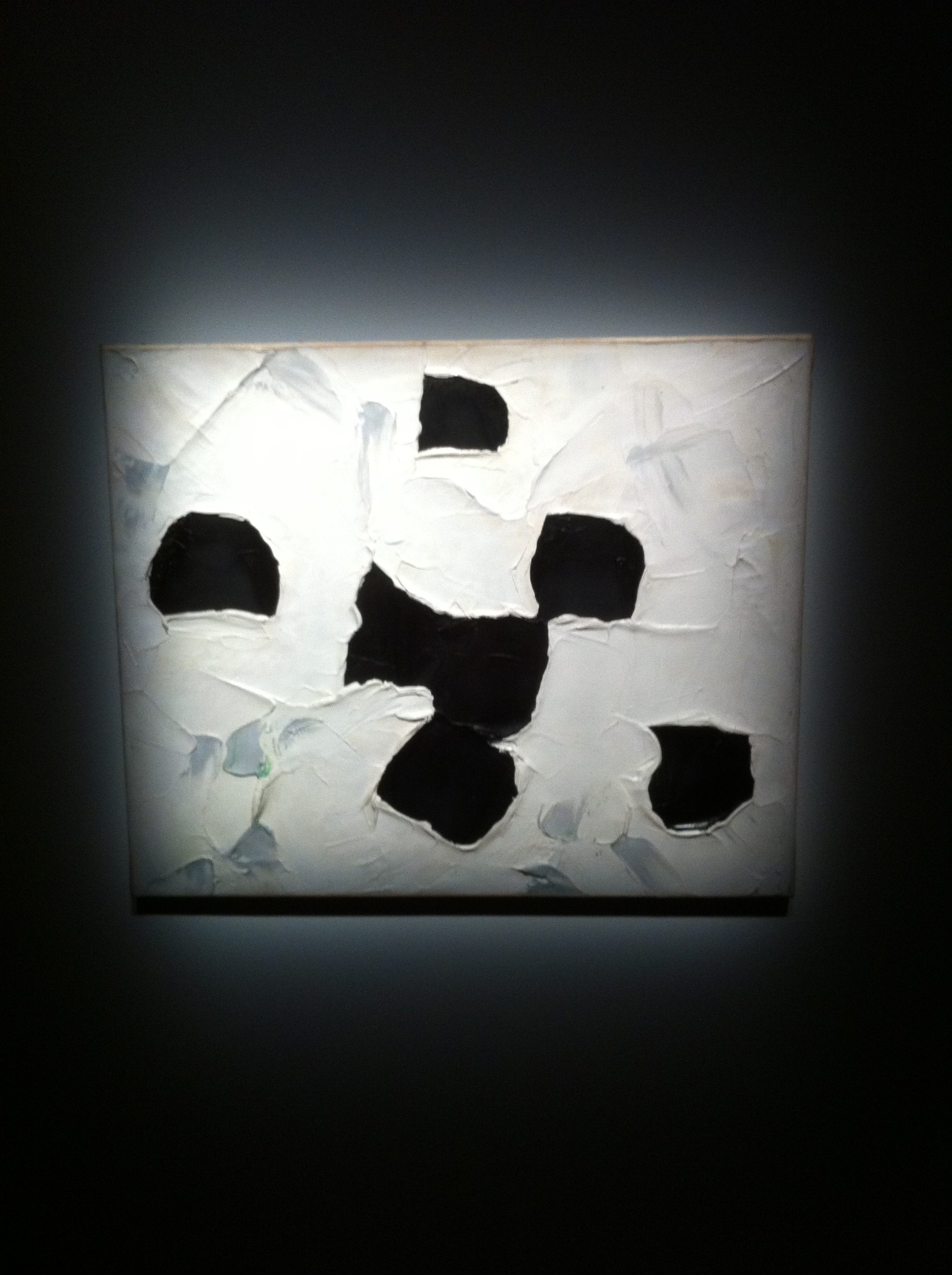
Composition 11, ca 1957. Exhibited Dec. 2011 at the Big Bang exhibition Musée des beaux-arts de Montréal

Paul-Émile Borduas (November 1, 1905 – February 22, 1960) was a Canadian artist known for his abstract paintings. He was the leader of the avant-garde Automatiste movement and the chief author of the Refus Global manifesto of 1948. Borduas had a profound impact on the development of the arts and of thought, both in the province of Quebec and in Canada.

== Biography ==
Borduas was born on November the first, 1905, in Saint-Hilaire, Quebec (a small village 50 kilometres from Montréal). He was the fourth child of Magloire Borduas and Éva Perrault. As a child, he engaged in bricolage - his first known artistic activity. He received five years of formal elementary school education, (which ended at the age of twelve) and some private lessons from a village resident. In his teens, Borduas met church painter and decorator Ozias Leduc, and Leduc agreed to take the young artist as an apprentice. Leduc provided Borduas with basic artistic training, teaching him how to restore and decorate churches. Leduc arranged for Borduas' instruction at the École Technique, in 1919, in Sherbrooke, Quebec. In 1923, assisted by a scholarship Leduc had secured for him, he enrolled in the École des Beaux-Arts de Montréal, continuing to work for Leduc at the same time. He received prizes for his paintings at both of these institutions. Despite discord between Borduas and the school administration, he continued his studies at Leduc's urgings.

Upon graduation in 1927 Borduas was hired by the Montreal Catholic School Commission as a high school art teacher. In January 1929 he began studies at the Ateliers d'Art Sacré in Paris, which he left to pursue church decoration work of Rambucourt, in the Meuse Valley, with Pierre Dubois in April. He returned to Saint-Hilaire in June 1930 (his funds being depleted), began teaching part-time, and in 1933 returned to teaching high school. In 1937, Borduas began teaching at l'École du Meuble. This was an important time in Borduas' life: "by meeting young men of his own generation with the same tastes and the same need for action, he finally discovered a stimulating intellectual and social environment."

In 1938, he encountered John Lyman, a Montreal painter and critic, at the first exhibition of one of Borduas' paintings. Lyman encouraged Borduas' involvement with the Contemporary Arts Society, and in January 1938 he was elected vice-president of this group. In 1941, he resumed painting after several years of study and teaching, during which time he and a group of students met regularly to discuss recent trends in European art. His first abstract paintings date from this year, and in April 1942 he exhibited 45 gouaches inspired by the abstract surrealism of Joan Miró. He became increasingly involved with about a dozen of his students, and they became known collectively as the Automatistes for their attempts to paint with pure psychic automatism as per the writings of André Breton. In January 1946, the first group exhibit of Borduas and his students was held in New York City, followed in April by an exhibit in Montreal. This was the first exhibit by a group of abstract painters in Canada. A second Montreal exhibit followed in February–March 1947. A critic, responding to this exhibit, coined the name "Automatists" for the group, after Borduas' painting Automatisme 1.47.

Borduas wrote Refus Global (or "Total Refusal", anglicized) in late 1947–early 1948. It was circulated in a folder that contained other Automatists' writings. This piece was originally intended to accompany an Automatist showing, but it was actually distributed alone. Refus Global served as an important manifesto that advocated the separation of church and state in Quebec, especially for the arts. In it Borduas "denounces the forces of oppression that had made of Quebec a suffocating environment, hostile to both individual and collective creativity".

We foresee a future in which man is freed from useless chains, to realize a plenitude of individual gifts, in necessary unpredictability, spontaneity and resplendent anarchy. Until then, without surrender or rest, in community of feeling with those who thirst for better life, without fear of set-backs, in encouragement or persecution, we shall pursue in joy our overwhelming need for liberation.

Four hundred copies of the manifesto went on sale August 9, 1948. Borduas was dismissed from l'École du Meuble on September 2 as a direct result of his involvement in this social critique. Even those who had tired of the repressive Duplessis régime, and advocated great social changes in Quebec, were reluctant to back Borduas' thorough condemnation of the Catholic Church—such a central influence on the French Canadian populace.

Borduas was ostracized and found himself unable to find a job, which was especially difficult as he was by now a father. He decided to take matters into his own hands. Borduas produced another piece in his defence, Projections Libérantes ("Liberating Projections"), which he completed in February 1949. Unfortunately, this more moderate composition, which clearly communicated Borduas' intentions in releasing Refus Global, was not enthusiastically received by the public or the presses. However, despite early denouncements, the manifesto marked the beginning of profound social change in Quebec and signalled the dawn of the Quiet Revolution.

In 1953, Borduas moved to New York, where he saw the works of Jackson Pollock, Franz Kline, and Mark Rothko and began to use the palette knife to apply his paint. In 1955, he moved back to Paris where he died of a heart attack in 1960.

In 1954, works by Borduas, along with those of B. C. Binning and Jean-Paul Riopelle, represented Canada at the Venice Biennale. In 1955, he represented Canada at the 3rd Bienal de São Paulo. In 1960, the Stedelijk Museum in Amsterdam gave him the posthumous exhibition, «Borduas 1905–1960» . In 1988 the Montreal Museum of Fine Arts gave him an enormous retrospective exhibition curated by François-Marc Gagnon.

In May 2012, his painting Froissement Multicolore sold for $663,750 at auction, surpassing the artist's previous auction price record by $150,000.

In May 2018, Borduas' important 1956 canvas Figures schématiques shattered the previous record for the artist's work at auction and sold for $3,601,250 at the Heffel Fine Art Auction House spring live auction.

== Recognition and honors ==
- Since 1977, the Prix du Québec in visual arts is named: Prix Paul-Émile-Borduas.
- On May 22, 1981 Canada Post issued 'Paul-Émile Borduas, Untitled No. 6' designed by Pierre Fontaine. The stamps were based on a painting "Sans titre no 6", circa 1957 by Paul-Émile Borduas, in the Musée d'art contemporain de Montréal, Montréal, Quebec. The 35¢ stamps are perforated 13.5 and were printed by British American Bank Note Company.
- 1998, Prix Condorcet to All signatories of Refus Global.
- 2024, The Government of Canada recognized Paul-Émile Borduas as a "person of national historic significance"

== Bibliography ==
- Reid, Dennis (1988). A Concise History of Canadian Painting, Second Edition. Don Mills: Oxford University Press Canada. ISBN 0-19-540663-X.
- Borduas, Paul-Émile. Paul-Émile Borduas, Écrits/Writings, 1942-1958, François-Marc Gagnon, Ed., translated by François-Marc Gagnon and Dennis Young. The Press of the Nova Scotia College of Art and Design: Halifax, 1978.
- Gagnon, François-Marc. Paul-Émile Borduas, 1905-1960 The National Gallery of Canada: Ottawa, 1976.
- Gagnon, François-Marc. Paul-Émile Borduas, Biographie critique et analyse de l'oeuvre, Fides: Montréal, 1978.
- Gagnon, François-Marc. Paul-Émile Borduas: Life & Work, Art Canada Institute, 2014.
