= Les Automatistes =

Canadian art group

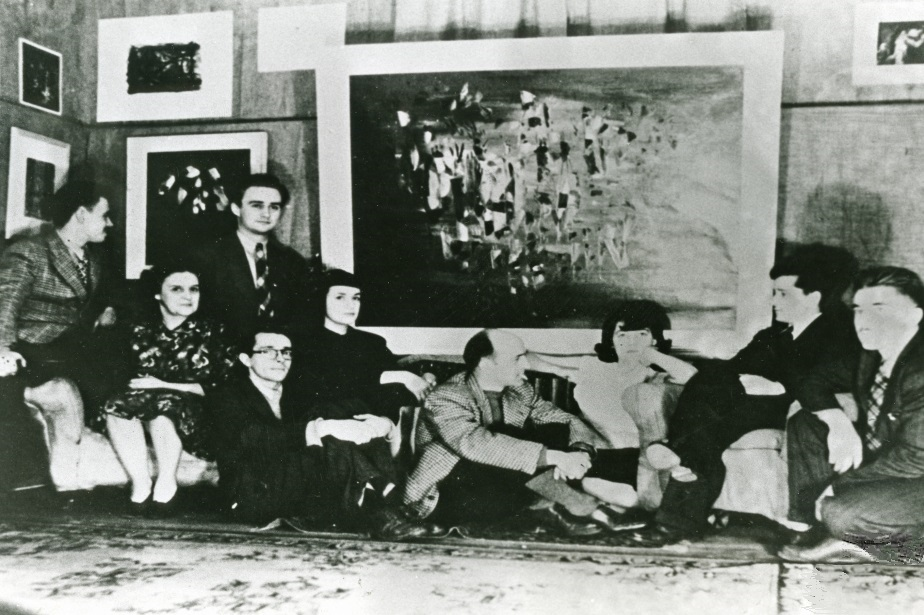
Exhibition of the Automatistes, 1947 Claude Gauvreau, Julienne Gauvreau, Pierre Gauvreau, Marcel Barbeau, Madeleine Arbour, Paul-Émile Borduas, Madeleine Lalonde, Bruno Cormier and Jean-Paul Mousseau

Les Automatistes were a group of Québécois artistic dissidents from Montreal, Quebec, Canada. The movement was founded in the early 1940s by painter Paul-Émile Borduas. Les Automatistes were so called because they were influenced by Surrealism and its theory of automatism. Members included Marcel Barbeau, Roger Fauteux, Claude Gauvreau, Jean-Paul Riopelle, Pierre Gauvreau, Fernand Leduc, Jean-Paul Mousseau, Guy Borremans, Marcelle Ferron and Françoise Sullivan.

The movement may have begun with an exhibition Borduas gave in Montreal in 1942. Held at the Ermitage, an exhibition hall owned by the Collège de Montréal, the show featured gouaches that illustrated the artist's experimentation with non-figurative painting. Initially, les Automatistes exhibited in makeshift venues, since no commercial gallery was willing to show the work of all the members. However, the group was soon being exhibited in Paris and New York also. Though it began as a visual arts group, it also spread to other forms of expression, such as drama, poetry and dance. The title "les Automatistes" came from journalist Tancrède Marcil Jr., in a review of their second exhibit in Montreal (February 15 to March 1, 1947), which appeared in Le Quartier Latin (the Université de Montréal's student journal).

In 1948, Borduas published a collective manifesto called the Refus global, an important document in the cultural history of Quebec and a declaration of artistic independence and the need for expressive freedom. The decision to write the manifesto was partly influenced by Jean Paul Riopelle, who had recently signed the Surrealist manifesto Rupture inaugurale during a visit to Paris. Refus global was published in a first edition of four hundred copies, which went on sale at the Librairie Tranquille in Montreal on August 9, 1948. The manifesto's denunciation of the Catholic Church's authority was particularly scandalous and resulted in the group's public humiliation. This ultimately led to a kind of martyrdom but was initially devastating. Borduas was dismissed from his position at the École du meuble and, unable to find work, left Quebec permanently in 1953. Although the group dispersed soon after the manifesto was published, the movement continues to have influence, and may be considered a forerunner of the Quiet Revolution.

Alongside Lyrical Abstract painters in France, the Automatistes favoured a fluid, painterly technique over the comparatively reserved, hard-edge abstraction so popular in the U.S. and Eastern Europe at the time. Much like a non-objective Group of Seven, they were looking to create a distinctively Canadian artistic identity. Heavily influenced by Surrealist manifestos and poetry, their work was largely stream-of-consciousness inspired, believing this to be a truer means of communicating subconscious emotions and sensory experiences; they wanted to be liberated from intention, reason, and any kind of structure, in order to communicate a universal human experience without bias. This resulted in increasingly crude or intuitive methods such as applying paint with palette knives and fingers and painting blindfolded, their efforts contradicting their claims of working without intention.

== Media ==
In 1954, the Automatistes were the subject of the NFB/CBC documentary series On the Spot in an episode entitled Artist in Montreal.

== See also ==
- Refus Global
- Les Plasticiens
- Painters Eleven
