= Northern River (painting) =

Painting by Tom Thomson

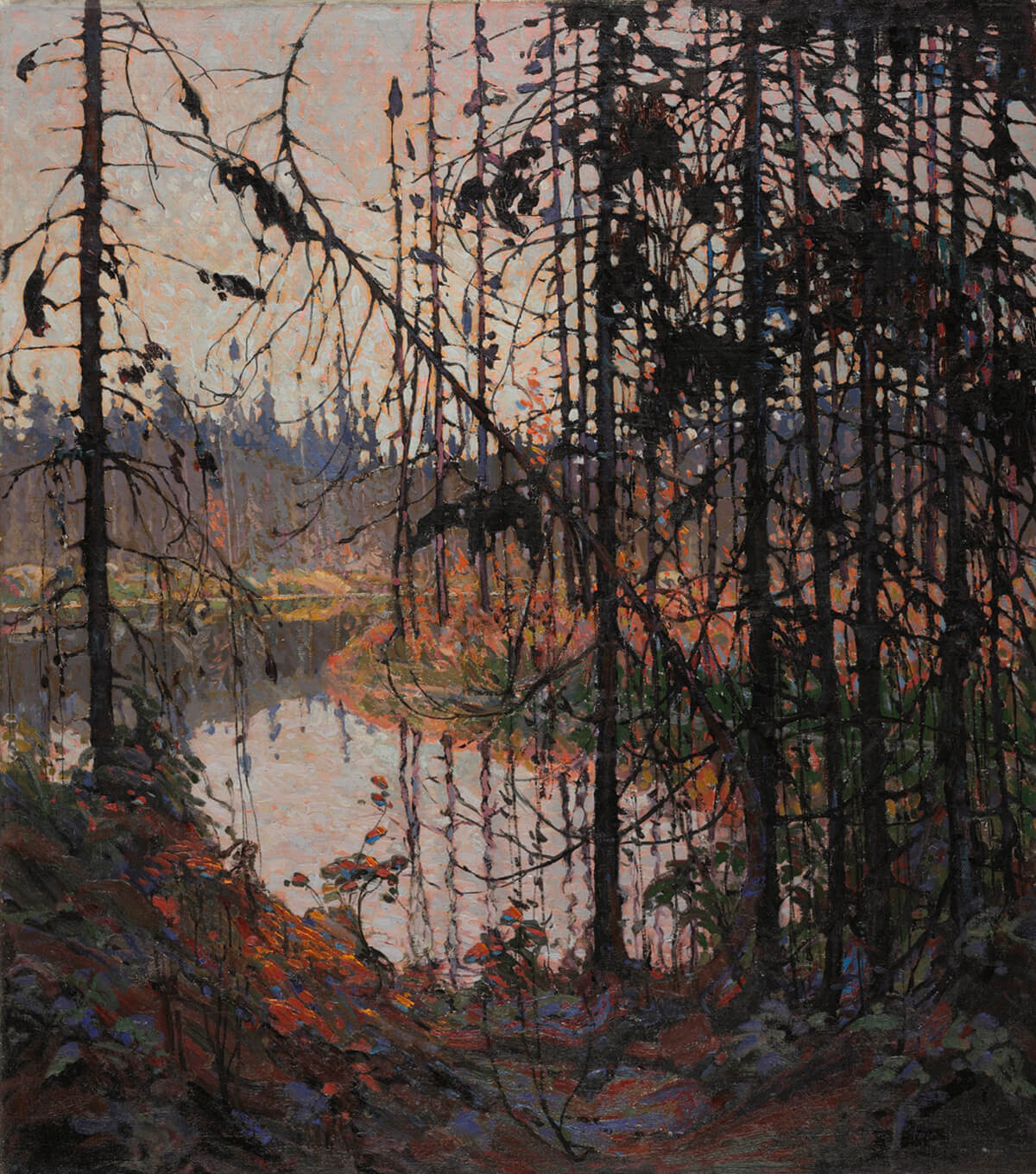
- Artist: Tom Thomson
- Year: 1914–15
- Medium: Oil on canvas
- Dimensions: 115.1 cm × 102 cm (455/16 in × 403/16 in)
- Location: National Gallery of Canada; Ottawa
- Accession: 1055

Northern River is a 1914–15 oil painting by Canadian painter Tom Thomson. The work was inspired by a sketch completed over the same winter, possibly in Algonquin Park. The completed canvas is large, measuring 115.1 × 102.0 cm (455/16 × 403/16 in). Painted over the winter of 1914–15, it was completed in Thomson's shack behind the Studio Building in Toronto. The painting was produced as he was entering the peak of his short art career and is considered one of his most notable works. In 1915 it was purchased by the National Gallery of Canada in Ottawa and has remained in the collection ever since.

== Background ==
Thomson first visited Algonquin Park in May 1912, venturing through the area on a canoe trip with his Grip colleague Ben Jackson. Thomson's transition from commercial art towards his original style of painting began to be apparent around this time. His early works, such as Northern Lake (1912–13) and Evening (1913), were not outstanding technically, yet they did illustrate an above average ability regarding composition and colour handling.

Northern River and the winter of 1914–15 stand as a point of transition in Thomson's art. In 1914 he made himself a sketch box to hold 8½ × 10½ inch (21.6 × 26.7 cm) panels, allowing him greater opportunity for sketching. A. Y. Jackson in particular taught him about the subtleties of composition, colour and technique in general, allowing the sketches that followed show a beginning desire to experiment with colour and texture rather than continue with the precision and subdued nature of his earlier works.

== Description ==
In a letter to James MacCallum, Thomson referred to Northern River as his "swamp picture." (Note: Thomson would specifically write, [...] I hear that my swamp picture is down at Ottawa on appro. Hope they keep it. Yours truly / Tom Thomson) Though Thomson was typically critical of his own work, he described the painting as being "not half bad" to a nephew. David Milne, a Canadian artist and critic, praised the painting, writing in a letter,

Just plain impossible, but he has done it, it stirs you. Any painter who has ever worked on this overlying pattern motive will realize at once that this is tackling a complication beyond reason. A great point in Thomson's favour this, and his lack of perfection. I am wary of craftsmanship. It is nothing in itself, neither emotion nor creation. [...] I rather think it would have been wiser to have taken your ten most prominent Canadians and sunk them in Canoe Lake—and saved Tom Thomson.

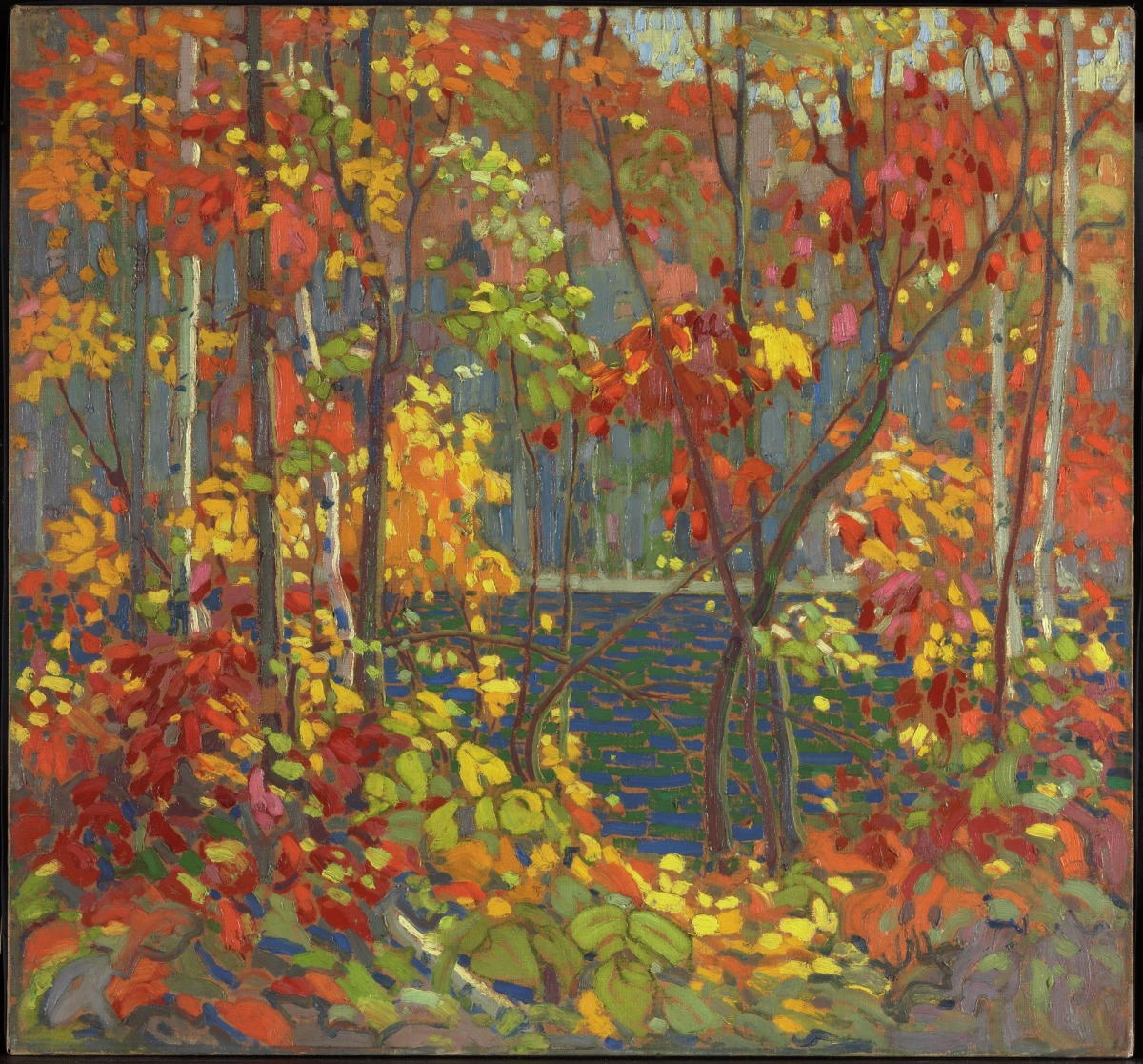
The Pool, Winter 1915–16. National Gallery of Canada, Ottawa

In an article for Canadian Magazine, MacCallumm would write about the uniqueness of the painting amongst Thomson's entire catalogue. In particular, while Thomson would normally depict trees as amalgamated masses, in this painting he gives them each an individual form:

Drawing was to [Thomson] the expression of form, and form might be expressed by any method, so long as the form is true. One would have expected that with his intimate knowledge of trees he would have loved to paint all their traceries. In the “Northern River” alone did he lavish detail on his trees and here only because it helped the pattern. In one in whom the sense of design, of decoration was so developed that is the more striking, for in his sketches and in his larger pictures he always treated trees as masses. In his painting of them he gives form structure and colour by dragging paint in bold strokes over an underlying tone. Like many other painters he felt the limitations of paint, the impossibility of expressing on a flat surface the solidity and thickness of a tree, and in some canvasses almost modeled them in paint, while in others he got the same effect by expressing them by deep grooves in the paint.

The painting recalls elements of A. Y. Jackson's 1914 canvas, A Frozen Lake, which Thomson likely saw in November 1914 before Jackson took it in December to be exhibited. Both paintings share a motif of trees and thin, sinuous branches obscuring the view to a body of water. The directional emphasis of the image is placed in the vertical direction, especially apparent when contrasted with the later canvas, The Pool.

Given Thomson's love of poetry, the title of the work may be a reference to the William Wilfred Campbell poem, A Northern River. Campbell was a Canadian poet who lived in Owen Sound, nearby to Thomson's hometown of Leith.

=== Sketch to studio painting ===
Study for "Northern River"
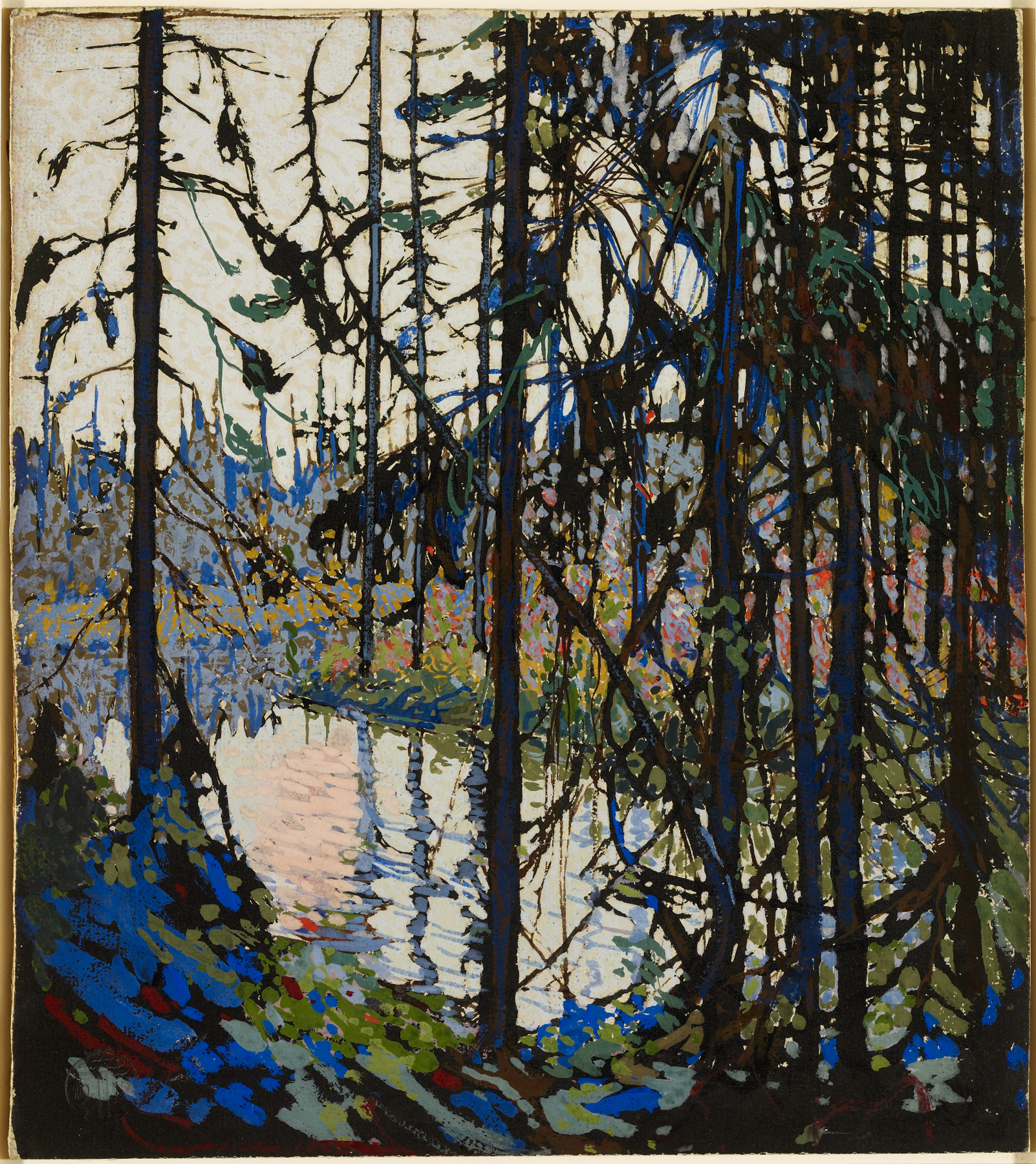
- Artist: Tom Thomson
- Year: Winter 1914–15
- Medium: Graphite, brush and ink and gouache on illustration board
- Dimensions: 30.0 cm × 26.7 cm (1113/16 in × 10½ in)
- Location: Art Gallery of Ontario; Toronto
- Accession: 82/176

It is not known where the original study was made. Though it is typically assumed to have been completed in Algonquin Park, Thomson's friend Winifred Trainor claimed that it was set outside the Park. Curator Charles C. Hill has instead suggested that the sketch was "[p]robably painted in his Toronto studio, it is most likely a memory—an amalgam of experiences rather than a specific site."

The initial sketch of the scene illustrates Thomson's adept ability to transform his small sketches into powerful studio paintings. This is apparent with other sketch-painting pairings, such as Opulent October, Spring Ice, The Jack Pine and The West Wind, amongst many other examples. Thomson's first gouache study of the work was brightly coloured partly because gouache reflects more light than oil on canvas does. To make the eventual studio painting livelier, he included reds, oranges and yellows within the foreground, though still maintaining the original gouache blends in the sky. The dominant colour of the painting is black, an oddity within Thomson's corpus. Curator and scholar Joan Murray has written that the final canvas closely follows the original study, but with key differences. For one, the canvas is devoid of the accidental brushstrokes present in the sketch. Foreground space was also added to better convey depth and the trees are simpler and more defined, with less foliage present.

=== Art Nouveau ===
In Thomson's time as a commercial artist, he became familiar with the then contemporary decorative style of Art Nouveau. Art historian David P. Silcox has described Northern River as utilizing the same sinuous forms that are to be found in the art style. Of particular note are the "S-curves" of the trees which have their origins in Thomson's work as a draughtsman. He would continue to utilize this motif in other later works, such as Decorative Landscape, Birches (1915–16) and The West Wind (1916–17). Fellow artist A. Y. Jackson would affirm the Group of Seven's tendency towards using Art Nouveau styles within their work, writing that, "We (the Group of Seven and Tom Thomson) treated our subjects with the freedom of designers. We tried to emphasize colour, line and pattern."

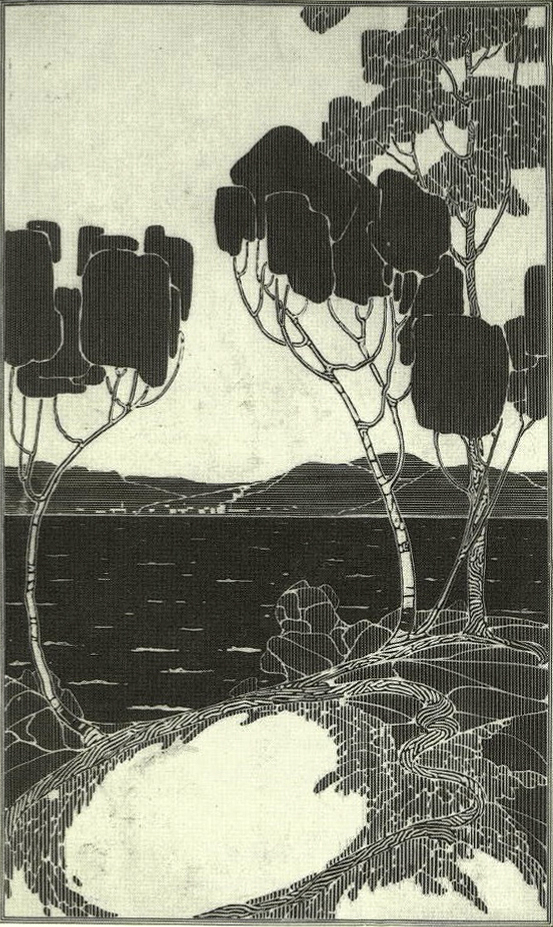
Advertising or calendar drawing, Fall-winter 1912. Location unknown

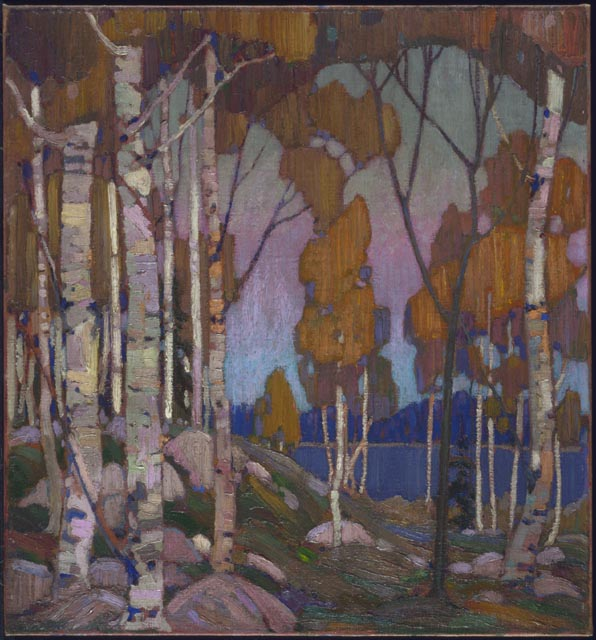
Decorative Landscape, Birches, Winter 1915–16. National Gallery of Canada, Ottawa

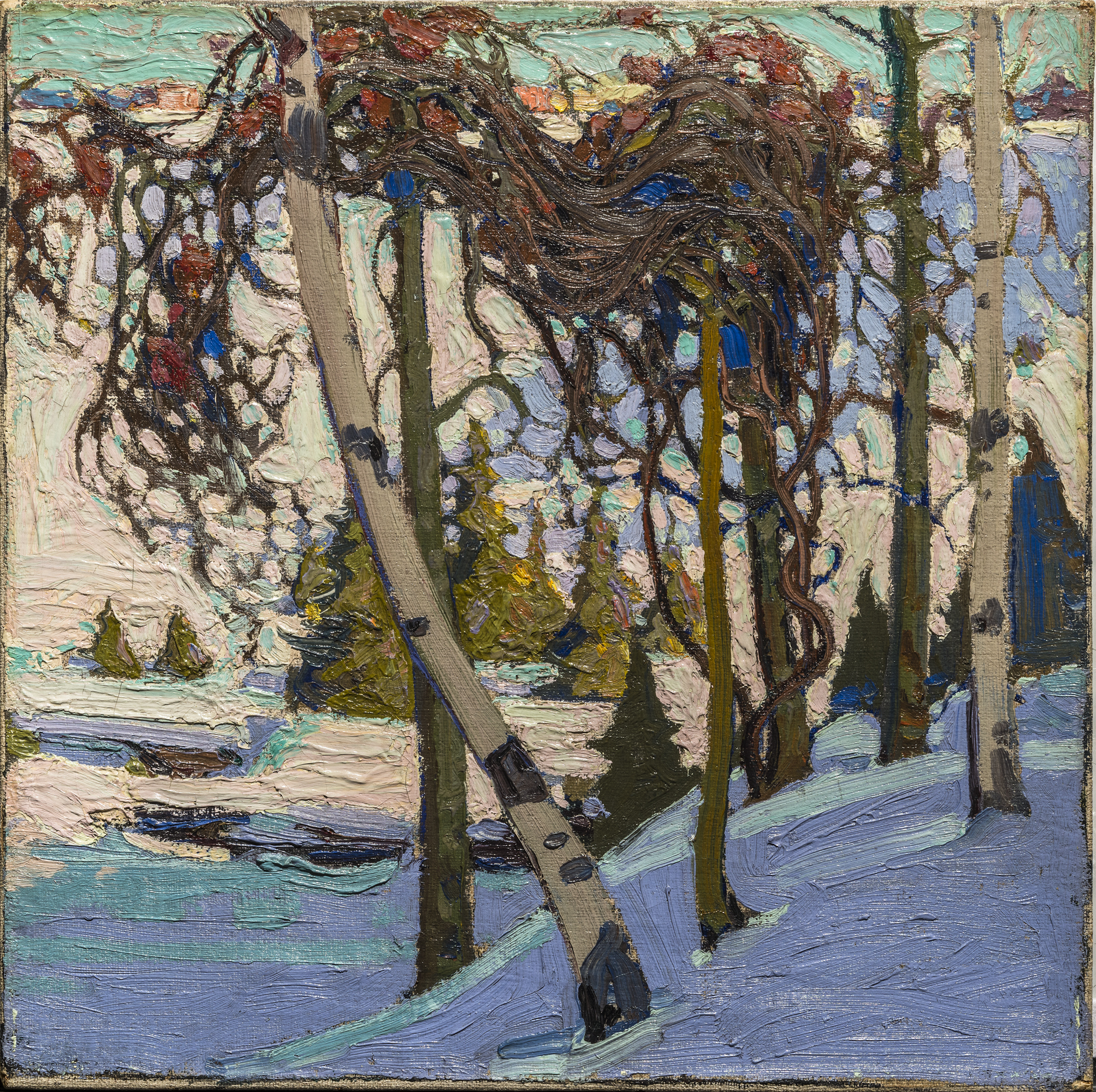
Early Snow, Winter 1916–17. Winnipeg Art Gallery, Winnipeg

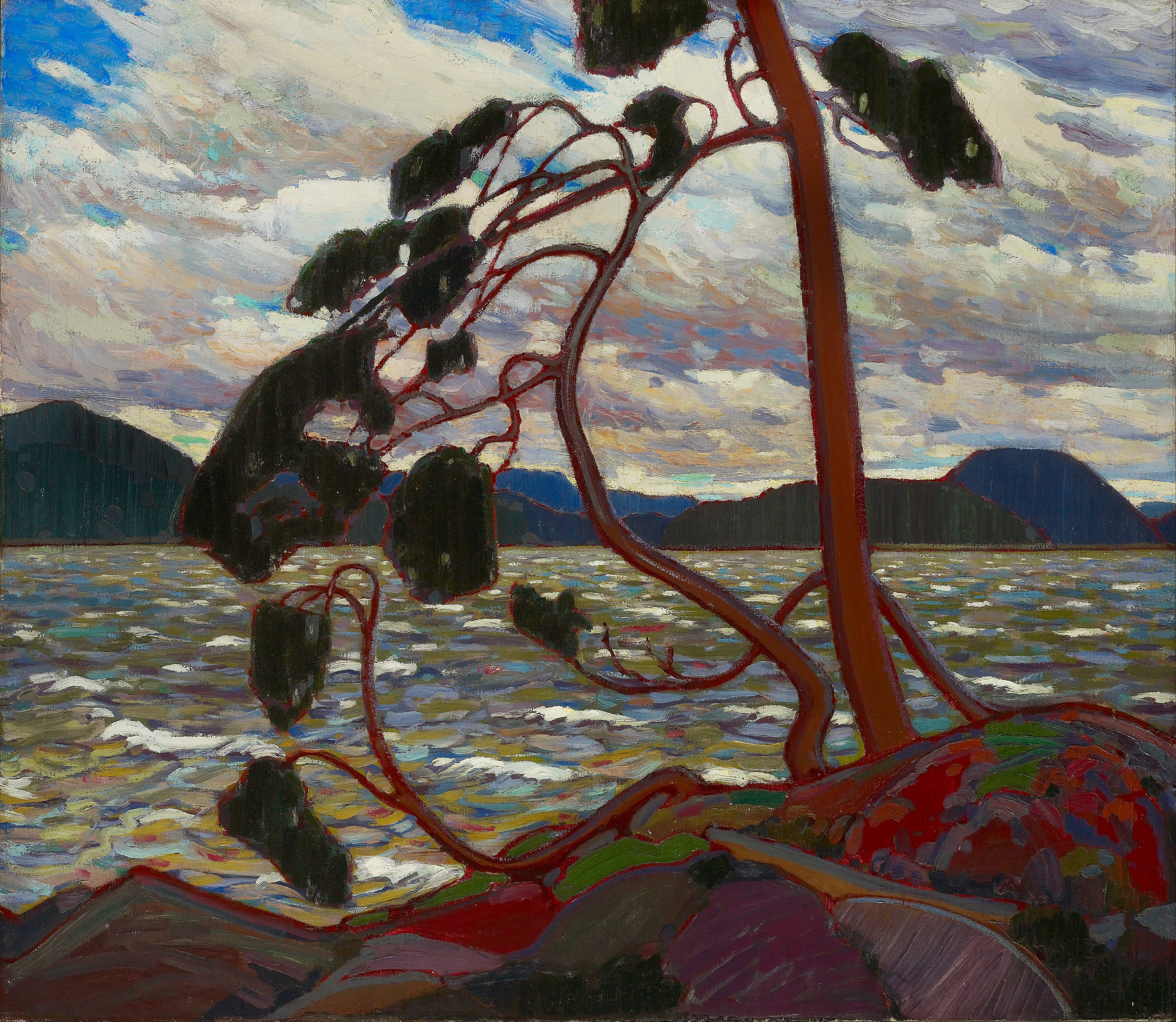
The West Wind, Winter 1916–17. Art Gallery of Ontario, Toronto

== Provenance and exhibition ==
The National Gallery of Canada purchased the painting from Thomson in 1915 for $500 (equivalent to CAD$14,000 in 2025), essentially a years wage for a painter like himself. Since then, it has appeared in over 30 exhibitions, including shows at Musée & du Jeu de Paume in Paris; Los Angeles; London; and Mexico.
