= France Bringing the Faith to the Hurons of New France =

- La France apportant la foi aux Hurons de la Nouvelle-France (French)
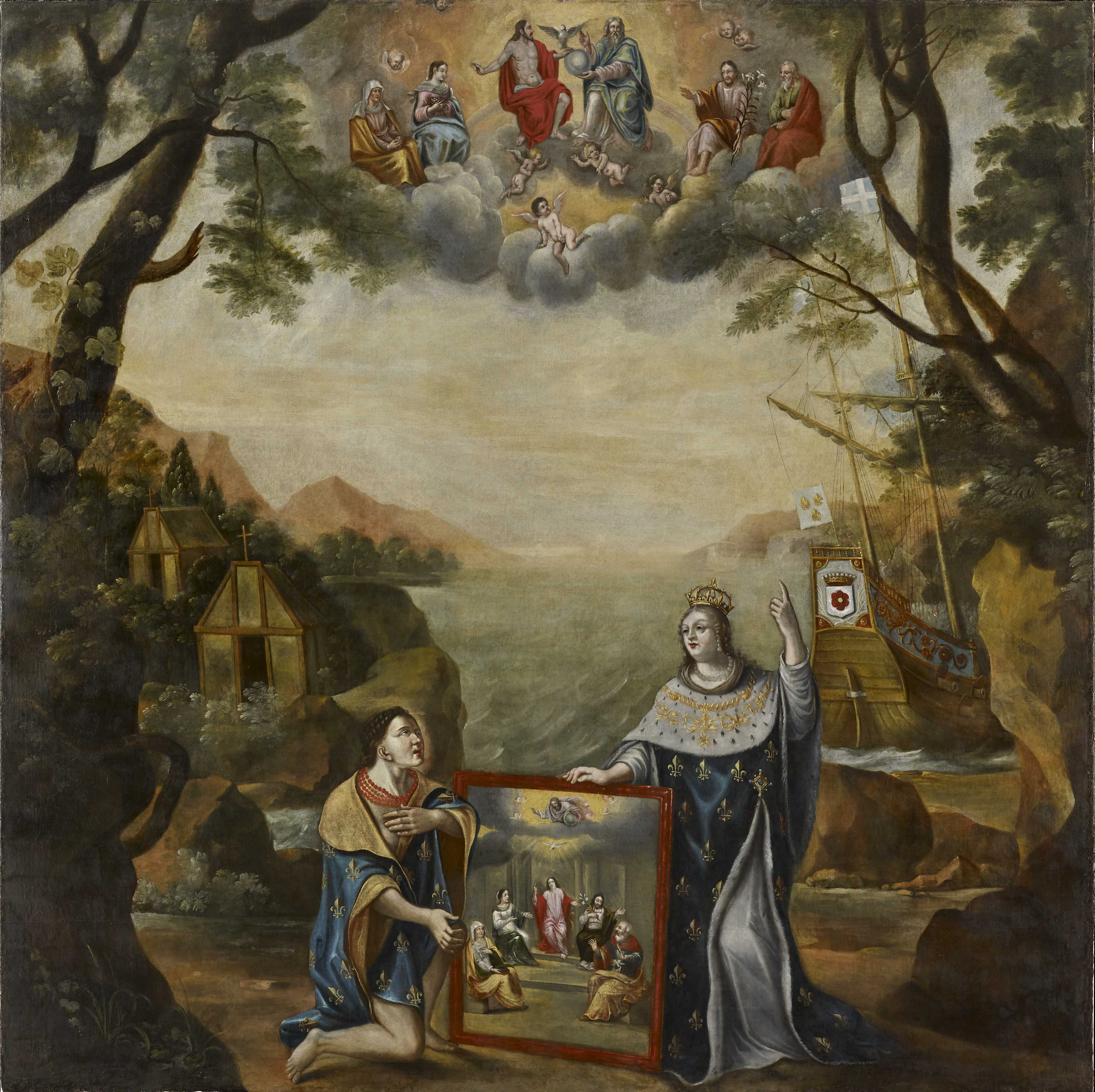
- Artist: Anonymous
- Year: c. 1666
- Medium: Oil on canvas
- Movement: Baroque
- Dimensions: 227.3 cm × 227.3 cm (89.5 in × 89.5 in)
- Designation: "Objet patrimonial classé", 1992 (Quebec)
- Location: Musée du Pôle culturel du Monastère des Ursulines, Quebec City
- Owner: Ursulines of Quebec
- Accession: 1997.1017
- Website: polecultureldesursulines.ca/en/museum-pole-culturel/

France Bringing the Faith to the Hurons of New France (French: La France apportant la foi aux Hurons de la Nouvelle-France [la fʁɑ̃s a.pɔʁ.tɑ̃ la fwa o y.ʁɔ̃ də la nu.vɛl fʁɑ̃s]) is an anonymous oil-on-canvas painting dated 1666 and preserved at the Musée du Pôle culturel du Monastère des Ursulines in Quebec City.

The work depicts a female figure, often interpreted as an allegory of France represented in the features of Anne of Austria, offering a small painting of the Holy Family to a kneeling Wendat man, under the celestial gaze of spiritual entities and at the edge of a landscape in which a French ship and religious buildings appear, strong symbols of the colonial and missionary presence.

Classified as an “objet patrimonial classé” (classified heritage object) by Quebec's Ministry of Culture and Communications since 1992, this canvas is considered one of the major visual testimonies of seventeenth-century religious and colonial history in New France.

== Description ==
France Bringing the Faith to the Hurons of New France is a square oil-on-canvas measuring 227.3 by 227.3 centimetres (89.5 by 89.5 inches), produced around 1666. Although no archival document identifies the artist, art historian François-Marc Gagnon argues that the work most likely originated in a French workshop before being sent to Quebec City, where it is documented within religious communities during the seventeenth century.

The scene depicts a political and religious allegory structured around two principal figures. On the left stands a richly dressed woman, interpreted by art historians Gagnon and Laurier Lacroix as a personification of France in the features of Anne of Austria. This female figure, typical of seventeenth-century allegorical representations, embodies both the monarchy and the Christian mission that France sought to promote in the Americas. With her right hand, she points to an image she presents to her interlocutor, in a gesture that is both didactic and authoritative. This device corresponds to a common practice in European devotional art, in which the image itself functions as a vehicle for religious transmission.

The object the woman offers is a small painting depicting the Holy Family. According to Lacroix, this mise en abyme reinforces the catechetical dimension of the work, as it literally shows the moment when Christian doctrine is brought to Indigenous populations. Art historian Joseph Monteyne notes that the inclusion of the Holy Family painting creates a dual iconographic register: that of the Christian image intended for doctrinal teaching, and that of a representation of metropolitan power projected into the colonial space. This type of device, characteristic of the pedagogical practices of the Society of Jesus, fits within a set of strategies described by historian Dominique Deslandres, for whom images play a central role in the transmission of catechism, in the creation of a shared religious language, and in the consolidation of spiritual alliances between missionaries and Indigenous communities. The inserted image does not correspond to any identifiable representation by a known artist, but rather to an iconographic type widely circulated in French workshops in the mid-seventeenth century, which confirms the function of the work as a missionary tool rather than as an art piece intended for the market.

Opposite the female figure is a Wendat man, kneeling with his hands joined in a gesture of acceptance. Gagnon and Lacroix note that this posture conveys a visual hierarchy in which the convert adopts a position of humility before the civilizing figure. This codification of the body is consistent with missionary images of the same period, which favour the depiction of a receptive, sometimes idealized Indigenous person within the conversion project described in the Jesuit Relations.

The landscape background completes the visual discourse of the work. Even though the setting does not depict any identifiable real site, it evokes a territory in the process of Christianization, with a shoreline, a few structures, and a ship in the distance. As art historian Pierre-Olivier Ouellet has demonstrated in his analysis of images of Franco-Indigenous power, such elements do not aim at ethnographic description but at the symbolic staging of a colonial space in which European presence already shapes the interpretation of the landscape.

The overall composition is thus built upon a clear organization. France, standing, occupies a dominant position and transmits the faith through the intermediary of a sacred image. The Wendat convert, placed in the foreground, receives this faith in an act of symbolic submission. The landscape situates the scene within an imagined geography of New France, serving less to describe the territory than to illustrate the political and religious project the French monarchy sought to establish there.

== Historical Context ==
The creation of France Bringing the Faith to the Hurons of New France is part of the broader context of French colonial expansion in the seventeenth century and the rise of Christian missions in North America. From the 1630s onward, the Jesuits played a central role in the evangelization of Indigenous peoples, particularly the Wendats, who were then allies of France. Their activities are extensively documented in the Jesuit Relations, published annually in Paris between 1632 and 1673. These texts describe missionary work, linguistic challenges, political tensions, and the continual efforts made to encourage conversions.

According to art historians François-Marc Gagnon and Laurier Lacroix, the painting must be understood as the product of a transatlantic network linking religious communities in the French metropole to overseas missions. Missionaries sent descriptions of their apostolic work back to Europe, and in return, works of art, paintings, engravings, and liturgical objects were shipped to New France to support Christian instruction. Gagnon and Lacroix emphasize that this circulation of images served a dual purpose: strengthening the piety of religious communities and settlers, and functioning as a pedagogical tool for converts.

The production of the painting around 1666 corresponds to a period in which the French monarchy was implementing a more structured policy to consolidate the colony. The arrival of the Carignan-Salières Regiment in 1665, the administrative reforms of Intendant Jean Talon, and the increased support of royal authority reflect the strategic importance of New France for the Crown. Although the surviving documents do not identify the artist or the exact patron of the painting, Gagnon and Lacroix cautiously suggest that the work was very likely created in France before being sent to Quebec City, possibly in connection with the Jesuits, who were its earliest known custodians. The elements visible in the composition, notably the ecclesiastical buildings and the ships in the background, are thus interpreted as signs of the political and religious consolidation of French presence in North America, a process closely tied to the redeployment of missions following the military and demographic crises that affected the Wendats in the 1640s and 1650s.

The allegory represented in the painting reflects a Christian and political imaginary deeply rooted in seventeenth-century French thought. As demonstrated by art historian Pierre-Olivier Ouellet, images depicting the relationship between France and Indigenous peoples are often constructed around a hierarchical dynamic: the metropole is presented as the holder of faith, culture, and moral authority, which it diffuses to the populations of the New World. The painting bears witness to this vision, associating the female figure, identified by some authors as a personification of France, with a mission of religious transmission.
