= Rodolphe Duguay =

Canadian artist, 1891-1973

- Born: April 27, 1891; Nicolet, Quebec
- Died: August 25, 1973 (aged 82); Nicolet
- Education: first and only student of Marc-Aurèle de Foy Suzor-Coté; Académie Julian, Paris
- Known for: painter, printmaker, illustrator
- Spouse: Jeanne L'Archevêque-Duguay

Rodolphe Duguay CM (April 27, 1891 – August 25, 1973) was one of the most important Quebec engravers of the first half of the 20th century. He created wood engraved prints and paintings of rural Quebec. In 2024, there was a retrospective of his work titled Rodolphe Duguay: True Nature at the Joliette Art Museum which brought attention to his work. The curator of the exhibition, Julie Alary Lavallée, said of Duguay's art career, "In today’s era of climate change, the emphasis on nature, simplicity, and daily life far from the city takes on new meaning."

The Rodolphe Duguay collection is held at the National Archives in Trois-Rivières. The artist's home and studio, the Maison et atelier Rodolphe-Duguay, can be toured in Nicolet, Quebec.

== Career ==
Duguay was born in Nicolet, Quebec. He initially studied at the Séminaire of Nicolet, but interested in art, in 1908 he left his father's farm and moved to Montreal. By 1911, he had enrolled as an art student at the Council of Arts and Manufactures in Montreal, where he studied with several prominent artists, including Charles Gill, Joseph Franchère, and Alfred Laliberté. He also studied with William Brymner at the Art Association of Montreal (1915-1916) and Maurice Cullen in 1917 and worked in the studio of Georges Delfosse.

Marc-Aurèle de Foy Suzor-Coté became his mentor and facilitated Duguay's further studies. With Suzor-Coté's support and the first Quebec Government Grant made to an artist, Duguay travelled to France in 1920. In Paris, Duguay studied at the Académie Julian with Jean Paul Laurens, the Académie Colarossi, and the Académie de la Grande Chaumière. Besides painting, he studied printmaking, especially making woodcuts. He became friendly with Paul-Albert Moras, a French painter and printmaker, which furthered his interest in engraving. In 1927, Duguay returned to Canada, a recognized artist.

In Nicolet, his father built him a workshop along the lines of his last Parisian workshop. Duguay worked for the church at Sorel, PQ as well as for Mgr Albert Tessier, Bishop of Trois-Rivières. In 1933, he illustrated a collection of poems by Ulric-L. Gingras titled "Du Soleil sur l'étang noir" ("Sun on the Black Pond"). This project marked the beginning of a woodcut period in his career. His illustrations for Clément Marchand's "Courrier des villages" ("Village Mail") in 1941 further established his reputation as an expert in the medium as did the illustrations he did for the novels of his wife, Jeanne L'Archevêque-Duguay.

He also painted the rural landscape around him, creating inventive and moving scenes of country life. Laurier Lacroix praises Duguay's "profound religious message based on goodness, innocence, purity and suffering" in his woodcuts and paintings.

In 1937, at the invitation of Horatio Walker Duguay exhibited at the Montmorency et frères gallery. He later exhibited his work in Montreal and Trois-Rivières. He had his last exhibition in 1929.

In 1973, he received the Order of Canada and died the same year. In 1975-1976, the National Gallery of Canada in Ottawa held an exhibition of 40 of his woodcuts, curated by Jean-René Ostiguy. His work is in the collections of the National Gallery of Canada, the National Museum of Fine Arts of Quebec, the Bibliothèque et Archives nationales du Québec and the Joliette Art Museum. After his death, two series of his woodcuts were published, the Carnets intimes (1978).
