= Ozias Leduc =

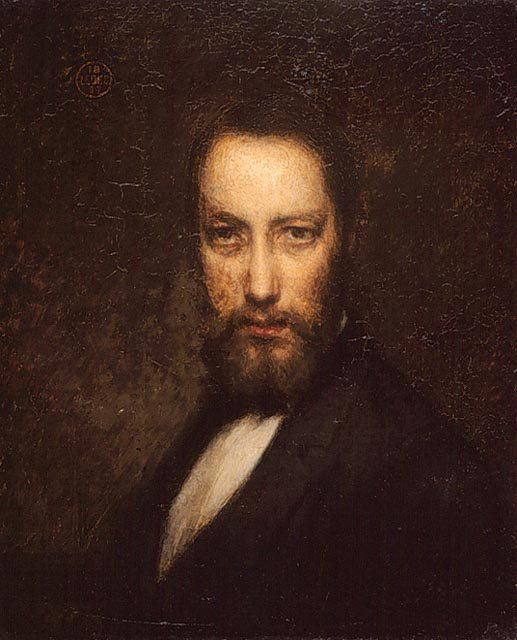
- Self portrait, 1899
- Born: 8 October 1864; Saint-Hilaire-de-Rouville, Quebec
- Died: 16 June 1955 (aged 90); Saint-Hyacinthe, Quebec
- Education: Self-taught
- Known for: Painter

Ozias Leduc RCA (October 8, 1864 - June 16, 1955) was a Canadian painter who was an early painter in Quebec. He produced portraits and landscapes. According to Laurier Lacroix, he was the first Canadian artist who can be seen as a philosopher as well as a painter.

== Biography ==
Leduc was born in Saint-Hilaire-de-Rouville. He was mainly self-taught. Around 1880, he worked with Luigi Cappello, an Italian painter, on church decorations. Around 1881, he was employed at Carli, a manufacturer of statues in Montreal. Around 1883, he worked with Adolphe Rho, decorating another church, this time in Yamachiche. After that, he started working on his own on church decorations. Leduc made a brief trip to Paris and London in 1897 with Suzor-Coté, where he was influenced by the Impressionists.

Leduc lived a very solitary life in his home town and was dubbed "the sage of St-Hilaire". He received an Honorary doctorate from the Université de Montréal in 1938. He was made a member of the Royal Canadian Academy of Arts. His legacy includes teaching Paul-Émile Borduas. He died in Saint-Hyacinthe in 1955.

== Works ==
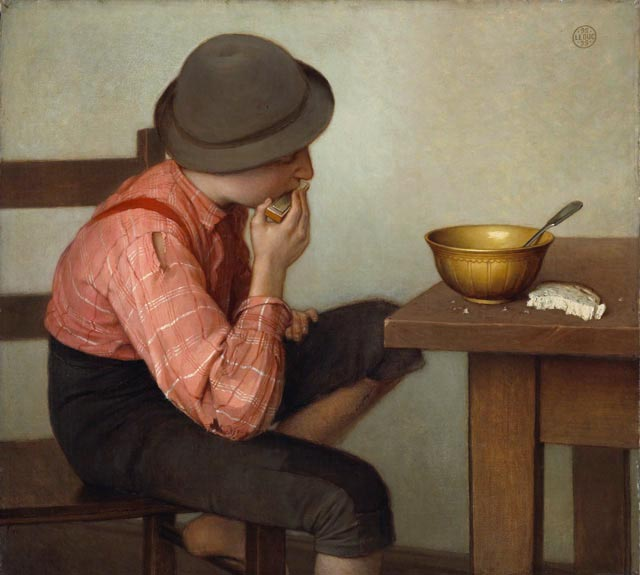
Leduc's Boy with Bread, (1892-99), National Gallery of Canada.

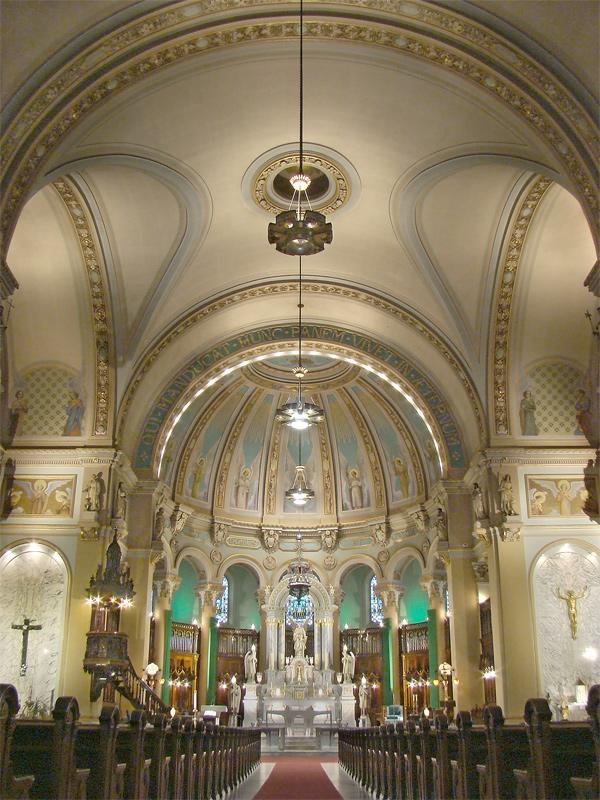
Church of Saints-Anges-Gardiens, decorated by Ozias Leduc

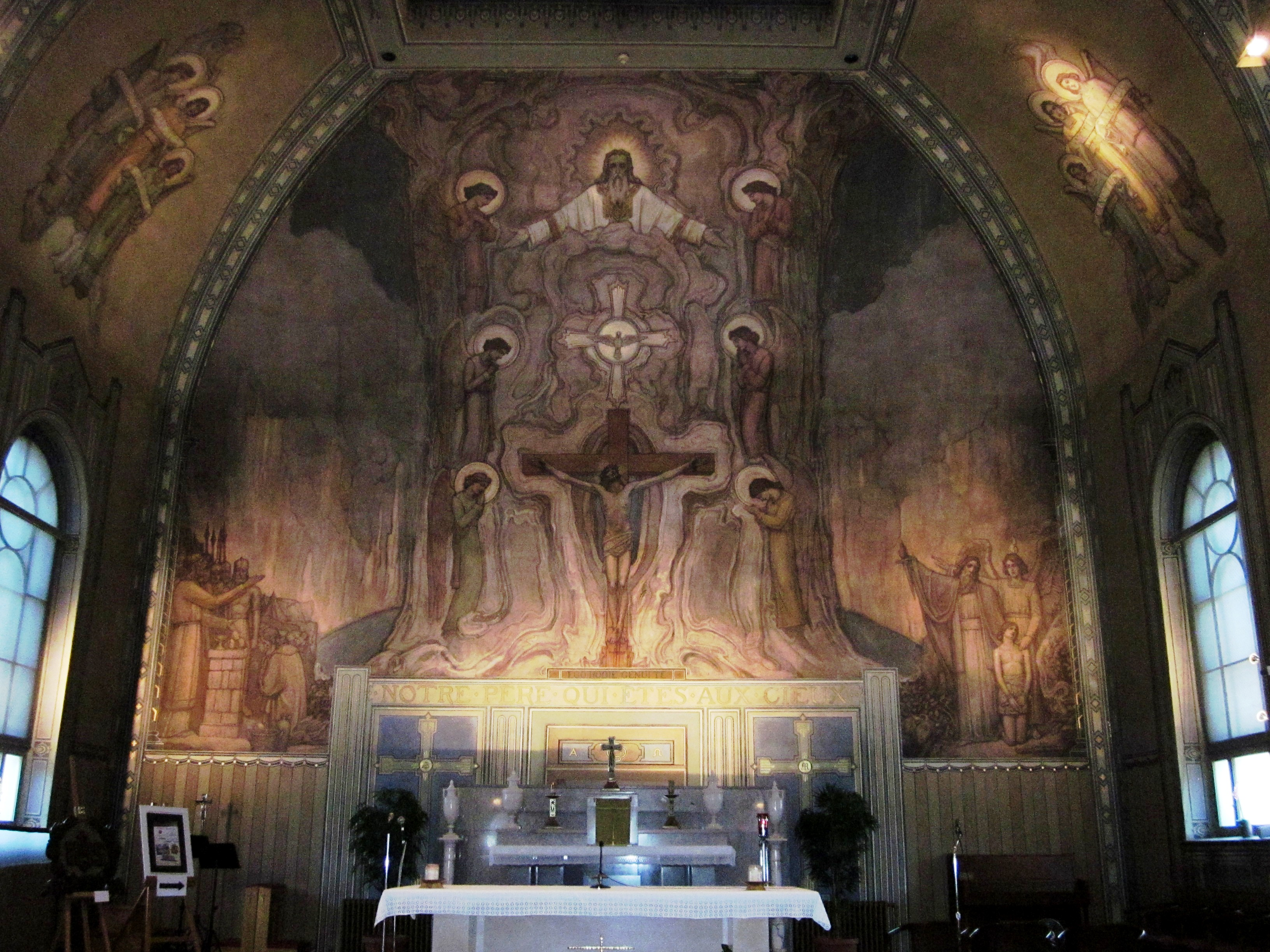
La Gloire Divine (1944-1947), Notre-Dame-de-la-Présentation, Shawinigan

During his career, he decorated more than 30 churches and chapels in Quebec, Nova Scotia and the Eastern United States. These included St Ninian's Cathedral in Antigonish (1902-1903), the churches of Saint Romuald in Farnham (1905), Saint-Enfant-Jésus du Mile-End in Montreal (1917-1919), the chapel of the bishopric of Sherbrooke (1922-1932), the baptistery of the Notre-Dame Basilica of Montreal (1927-1928), and the church of the Holy Guardian Angels in Lachine (1930-1931).

He is best known for his work decorating the Notre-Dame-de-la-Présentation church in Shawinigan South, Quebec, a project which took him thirteen years, until his death. The work was completed by his assistant, Gabrielle Messier. Notre-Dame-de-la-Présentation church was designated a National Historic Site in 2004 and a federal marker reflecting that status was erected at the church in 2005.

== Recognition ==
On May 20, 1988, Canada Post issued 'The Young Reader, Ozias Leduc, 1894' in the Masterpieces of Canadian art series. The stamp was designed by Pierre-Yves Pelletier based on a painting The Young Student (1894) by Ozias Leduc in the National Gallery of Canada, Ottawa, Ontario. The painting shows the Ozias Leduc's younger brother, concentrating on a picture book, pencil in hand. The 50¢ stamps are perforated 13 X 13.5 and were printed by British American Bank Note Company.

Leduc was named a National Historic Person on January 12, 2018. There are streets named after him in Shawinigan-Sud, Drummondville and Rivière-des-Prairies, a park in Lévis and a secondary school in Mont-Saint-Hilaire.

== Record sale prices ==
At the Cowley Abbott Auction of An Important Private Collection of Canadian Art – Part III, December 6, 2023, lot 112, Leduc's Les foins (The Hayfield), 1901, oil on canvas, 24 x 36 ins ( 61 x 91.4 cms ), Auction Estimate: $60,000.00 - $80,000.00 realized a price of $288,000.00.
