= RiverBrink Art Museum =

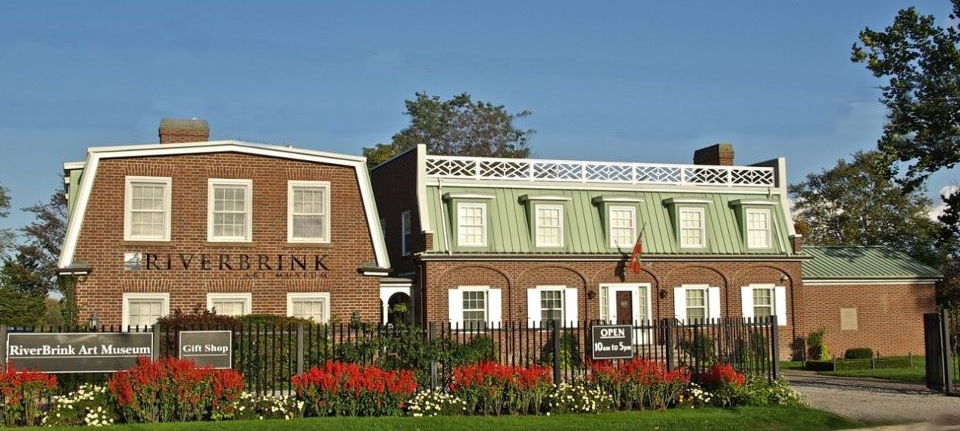
- Location: 116 Queenston St, Queenston, Niagara-on-the-Lake; Ontario, Canada
- Coordinates: 43.1703°N 79.0570°W
- Type: Art museum
- Director: David Aurandt
- Website: riverbrink.org

RiverBrink Art Museum is located on the Niagara Parkway in the historic village of Queenston, Niagara-on-the-Lake. Open to the public since 1983, the museum is home to a unique collection of over 1,400 works by Canadian and international artists.

== Museum ==
Along with paintings, prints, works on paper, and sculpture, the museum's collection includes decorative art, archival material, and rare books, assembled by Samuel E. Weir. An Ontario-based lawyer and avid art collector throughout his lifetime, Weir acquired the majority of the works in the museum, which continues to collect through donations and purchases. The location of RiverBrink had a profound influence on the art patron, as there are many depictions of Niagara Falls and the Niagara peninsula in the collection. In the RiverBrink collection are paintings by many of Canada's most significant artists, including Tom Thomson, Homer Watson, Marc Aurèle de Foy Suzor-Coté, Cornelius Krieghoff, Emily Carr, and members of the Group of Seven. The collection also contains artwork by well-known British, French, and American artists, such as Augustus John, Mary Cassatt, Armand Guillaumin, Grant Wood, and Edgar Degas, among others. The museum has a large collection of decorative arts, including English and Québec silver, clocks, antique furniture, Indian medals, coins, rugs and ceramics. In addition, RiverBrink's library and archives hold over 4,000 books, personal correspondence, maps, auction house records, and individual files of several hundred artists.

Exhibitions are organized from the permanent collection as well as loans from both public institutions and private collectors. To search the RiverBrink collection, visit the Canadian Heritage Information Network’s Artefacts Canada: Humanities database.

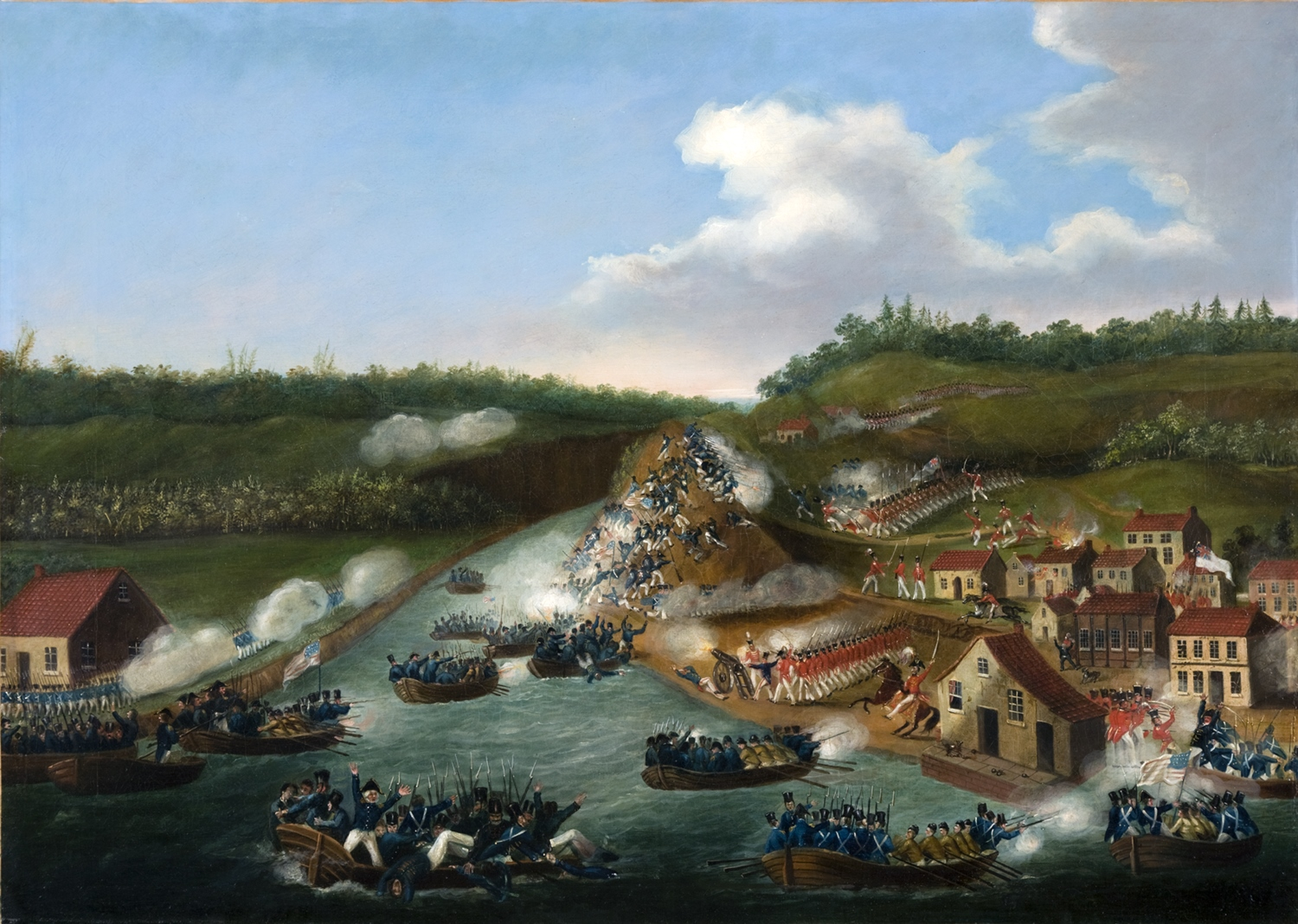
James B. Dennis, Battle of Queenston Heights, c. 1812–55

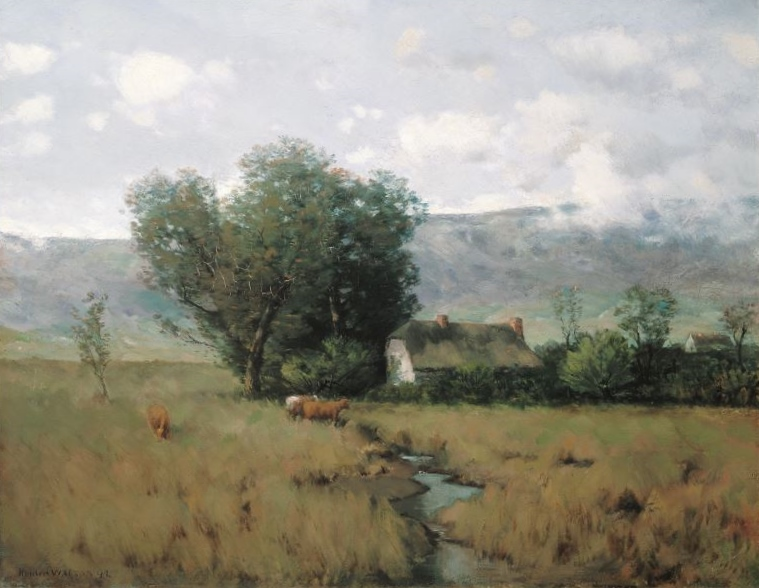
Homer Watson, The Lothian Hills, 1892.

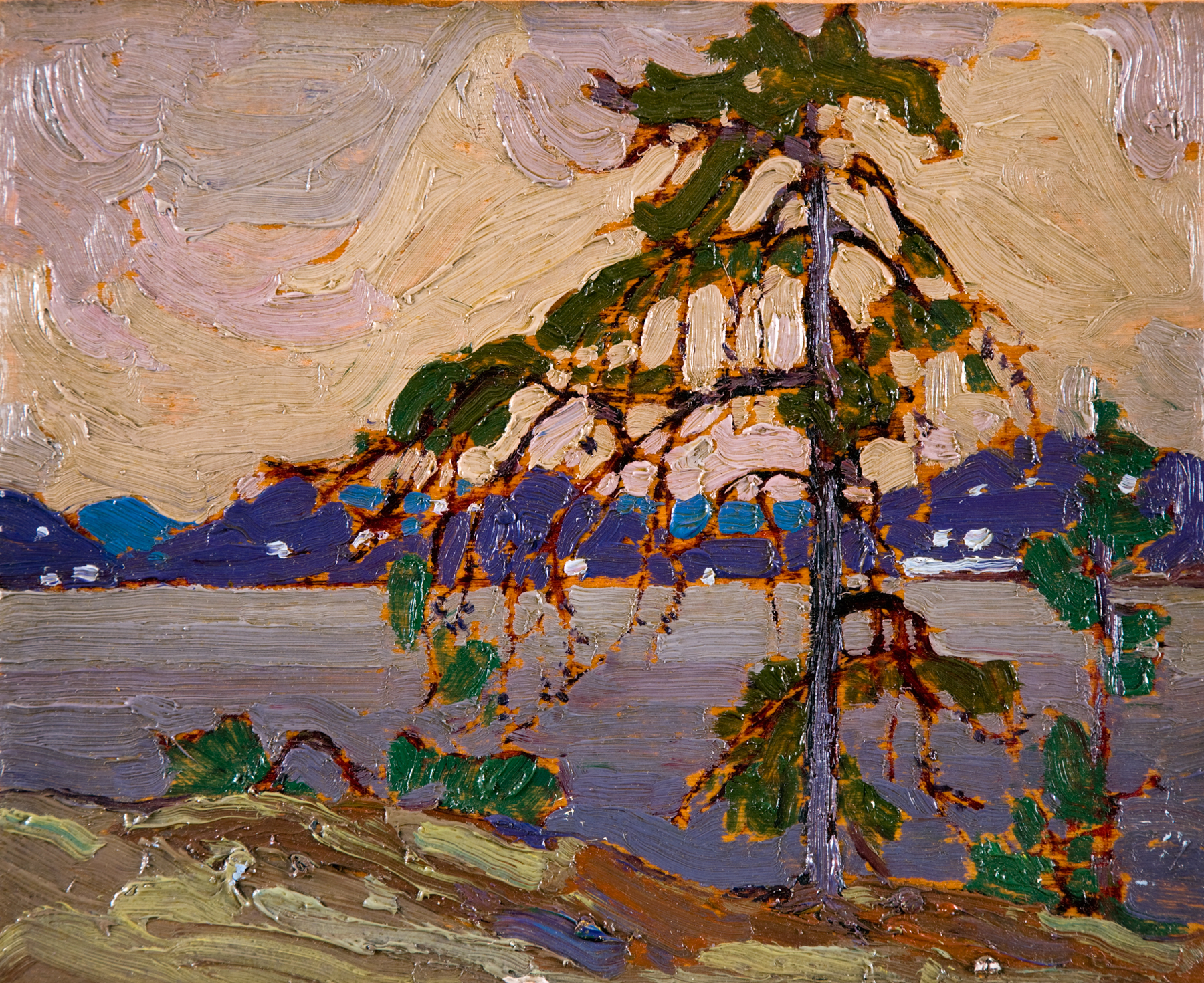
Tom Thomson, Sketch for "The Jack Pine", Spring 1916.

== History ==
Sam Weir was born in London, Ontario in 1898. He attended Osgoode Hall Law School in Toronto and was called to the Bar of Ontario in 1920. His interest in fine art began with the purchase of a watercolour by English artist Dame Laura Knight in the early 1920s. Not long afterward, he encountered a painting by Homer Watson and purchased The Lothian Hills (1892) directly from the artist in installments, a practice he would follow in many transactions. Despite numerous subsequent acquisitions, the oil painting by Watson remained a lifelong favorite. Sam Weir died in 1981, leaving his collection and estate to the Weir Foundation, incorporated in 1962.

== Architecture and design ==
Weir purchased land in Queenston in 1943 and began construction on the site in the late 1950s. The country residence and coach house were designed by English-born architect Arthur E. Nutter (1874–1967), a family friend and the first architect to practice in London, Ontario. Weir contributed significantly to the design, requesting details such as a fall-out shelter in the basement and a self-contained apartment over the coach house. For the main building, Nutter adapted a Georgian-style complete with mansard roof and gabled windows. The interior rooms retain their original wood paneling, installed by finish-carpenter Alexander Kiss, who used a variety of different woods, including maple, mahogany, oak, knotty pine, and walnut, with clear pine and birch ceilings. The home was completed in 1970 and converted into an art museum following Weir's death. In 1996, a large porch on the east side of the building was replaced by additional exhibition space.
