= Laurier Lacroix =

Canadian art historian, b. 1947

- Born: March 9, 1947; Sainte-Justine, Quebec
- Education: B.A. Concordia University (1971); M.A. in literature and French civilization, McGill University; M.A. in art history, University of Montreal; Ph. D. in history, Laval University, Quebec City
- Known for: art historian, curator, educator
- Awards: Member of the Society of Ten, PQ (2005); Member of the Academy of Letters of Quebec (2012); Order of Canada (2016); Heritage advisor at the Quebec Cultural Heritage Council (2016); Award of Excellence - Professional, Religious Heritage Council of Quebec (2021)

Laurier Lacroix CM (born March 9, 1947) is an art historian and professor whose research fields are primarily pre-1940 French-Canadian art and artists, such as Ozias Leduc and Marc-Aurèle de Foy Suzor-Coté as well as contemporary art with artists such as Irene Whittome. He is also concerned with the historiography of art history.

== Career ==
Lacroix was born in Sainte-Justine, Quebec. He received his B.A. from Concordia University, (1971); his M.A. in literature and French civilization, from McGill University; and his M.A. in art history, University of Montreal, all in Montreal. He then received his Ph.D. in history, from Laval University in Quebec City, PQ.

His masters thesis was on Ozias Leduc; his doctoral thesis was on the Desjardins Collection: European paintings collected at the beginning of the 19th century by Louis-Joseph Desjardins and his brother Philippe Desjardins (Lacroix wrote the book/catalogue for an exhibition of their collection at Quebec and Rennes, 2017).

From 1976 to 1986, he taught at Concordia University in Montreal. From 1988 he taught at UQAM from 1988 until his retirement in 2009. He curated several exhibitions with the Montreal Museum of Fine Arts and the Musée du Québec as well as other museums and in 2022 guest curated The Studio as Art: Histories of Artists' Studios in Québec for the Joliette Art Museum.

He is a Member of the Society of Ten in Quebec (2005). (Note: Lacrois's extensive bibliography, including articles, is given on this site.) He has also published several articles in The Journal of Canadian Art History - Annales d'histoire de l'art canadien (Concordia University) as well as in the Canadian Encyclopedia on artists such as Randolphe Duguay as well as Artists' Organizations in Canada. In 2016, he was appointed the heritage advisor at the Quebec Cultural Heritage Council.

== Selected publications ==
- Lacroix, Laurier (ed.), Jean-Pierre Duchesne, Gilbert L. Gignac, Monique Nadeau Saumier, Virginia Nixon and Anne Page, François Baillairgé (1759-1831): a portfolio of academic drawings (exhibition catalogue), Montreal: Concordia Art Gallery, 1985;
- Irene F. Whittome: A Sketched Journey, a Tribute to Jack Shadbolt, (1989);
- Mario Béland (dir.), Paul Bourassa, Laurier Lacroix, John R. Porter, Didier Prioul, Mary Allodi, Victoria Baker, Denis Castonguay, Joanne Chagnon, Lydia Foy, Gilbert Gignac, Yves Lacasse, Eva Major-Marothy, Denis Martin, Stanley G. Triggs, Painting in Quebec 1820-1850: New Perspectives, New Looks, Quebec: Musée du Québec, 1991;
- Painting in Montreal 1915-1930: The Painters of Montée Saint-Michel and their Contemporaries, 1996;
- Ozias Leduc: an art of love and reverie, 1996;
- Pierre Dorion, Art Gallery of the Cultural Center of the University of Sherbrooke, 2002;
- Suzor-Coté: Light and Matter, Quebec: Museum of Quebec; [Montreal]: Les Éditions de l'Homme; Ottawa: National Gallery of Canada, printed 2002;
- Guy Pellerin. The color of Ozias Leduc, 2004;
- "Writing Art History in the Twentieth Century". The Visual Arts in Canada: The Twentieth Century, 2010;
- The Arts of New France, Quebec, Publications of Quebec, 2012;
- The fabulous destiny of the paintings of the Abbés Desjardins: 17th and 18th century paintings from the museums and churches of Quebec under the direction of Guillaume Kazerouni and Daniel Drouin, 2017; with contributions from Mario Béland, Laurier Lacroix and others;
- Confidential experiments: the still lifes of Ozias Leduc (2017);
- "A Journey Home: Canadian Impressionists Return". Canada and Impressionism: New Horizons, 1880-1930, the catalogue/book edited by Rosemary Shipton for the National Gallery of Canada exhibition.
- The Studio as Art: Histories of Artists' Studios in Québec for the Joliette Art Museum, 2022;
- Ozias Leduc: Art and Work;
- River of Dreams: impressionism on the St. Lawrence , 2024;

== Selected honours and awards ==
- 1997: Career Award, awarded by the Quebec Museums Society;
- 2005: Member of the Society of Ten, Quebec;
- 2008: Gérard-Morisset Prize;
- 2008: Medal of Honor from the Faculty of Arts and Sciences of the University of Montreal;
- 2012: Member of the Academy of Letters of Quebec;
- 2016: Order of Canada;
- 2021: Award of Excellence - Professional, Religious Heritage Council of Quebec;
- 2021: Member of the Religious Heritage Council of Quebec.
