= Spring Ice =

Painting by Tom Thomson

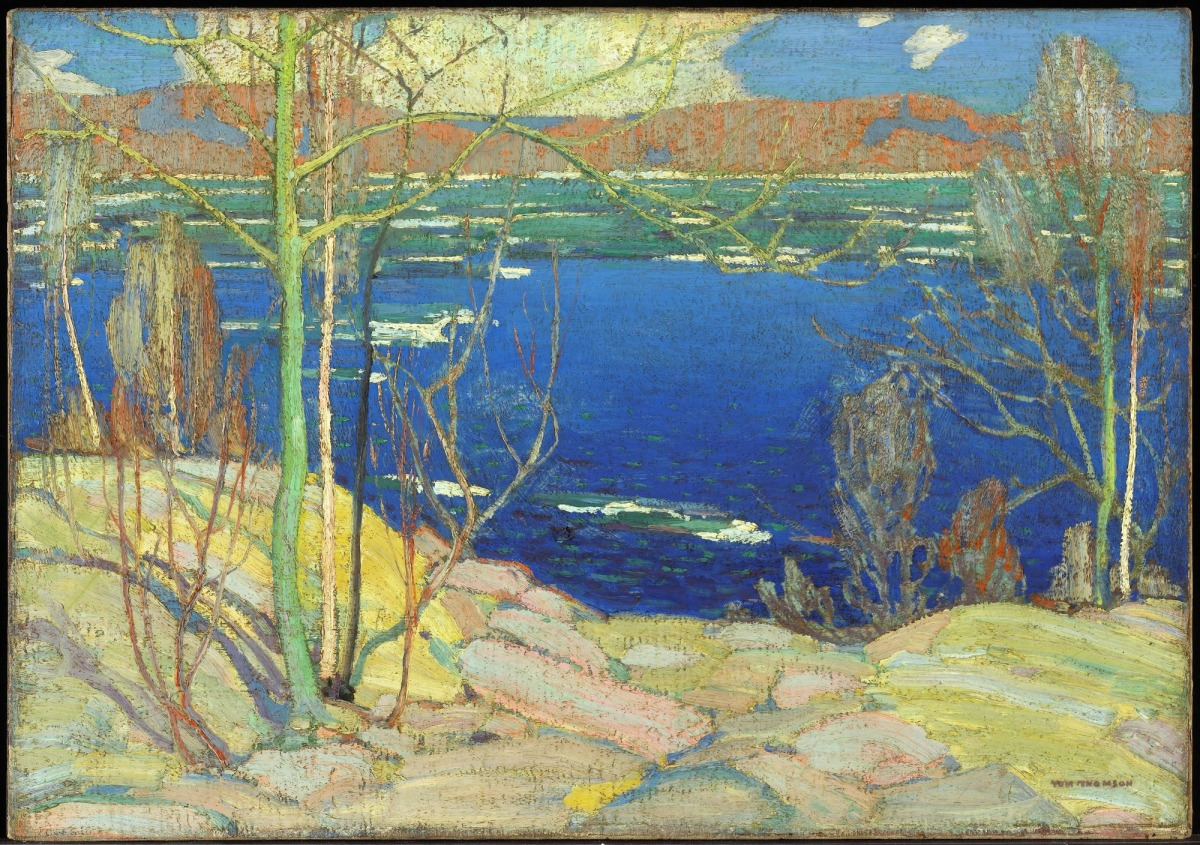
- Artist: Tom Thomson
- Year: Winter 1915–16
- Medium: Oil on canvas
- Dimensions: 72.0 cm × 102.3 cm (28.3 in × 40.3 in)
- Location: National Gallery of Canada; Ottawa
- Accession: 1195

Spring Ice is a 1915–16 oil painting by Canadian painter Tom Thomson. The work was inspired by a sketch completed on Canoe Lake in Algonquin Park. The completed canvas is large, measuring 72.0 cm × 102.3 cm (28.3 in × 40.3 in). Painted over the winter of 1915–16, it was completed in Thomson's shack behind the Studio Building in Toronto. The painting was produced as he was in the peak of his short art career and is considered one of his most notable works. While exhibited in a show put on by the Ontario Society of Artists, the work received mixed to positive reviews. In 1916 it was purchased by the National Gallery of Canada in Ottawa and has remained in the collection ever since.

== Background ==
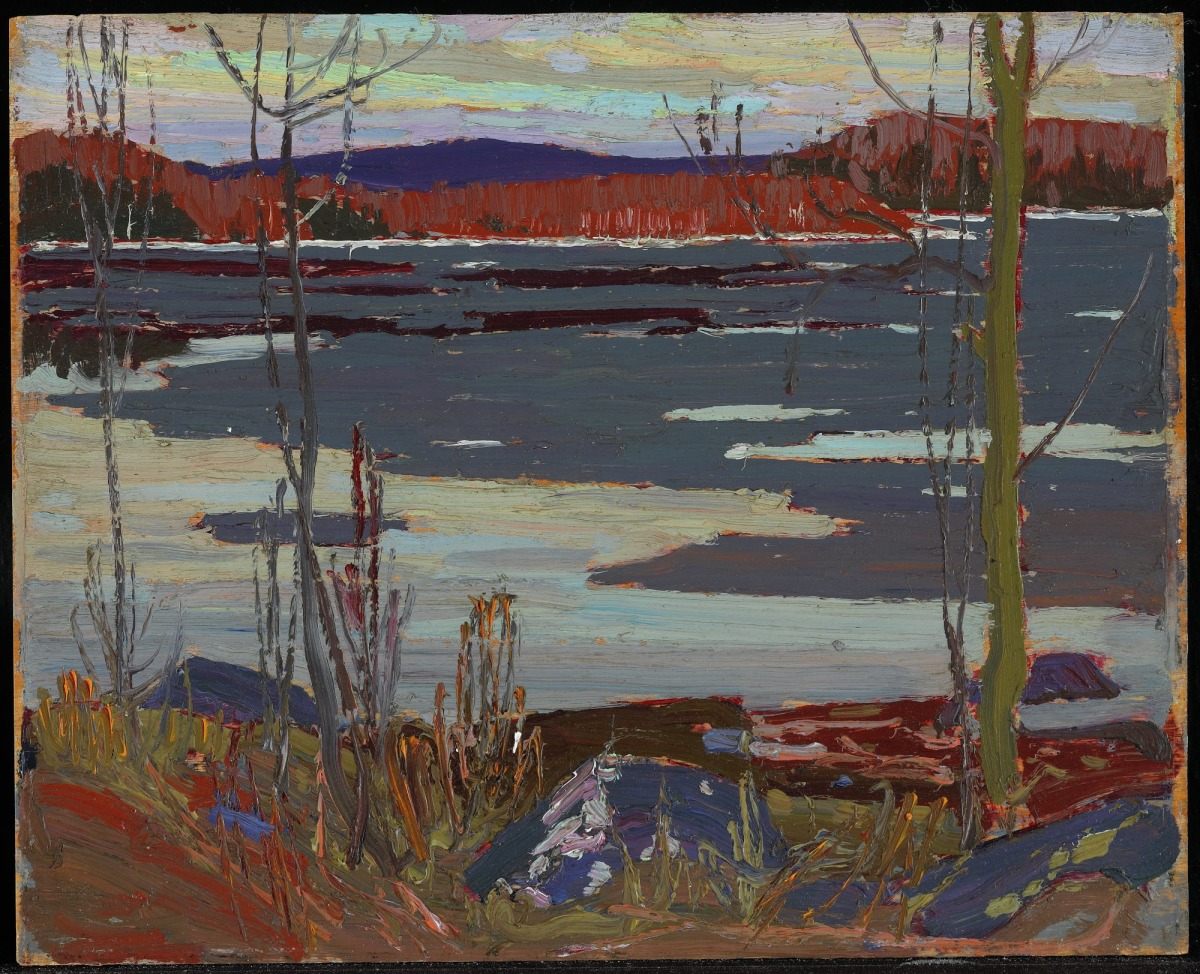
River, March–April 1915. National Gallery of Canada, Ottawa

=== 1915 sketching season ===
In the spring of 1915, Thomson returned to Algonquin Park earlier than he had in any previous year. In a letter to James MacCallum, he reported that he had already painted twenty-eight sketches by 22 April. He became fascinated with the "opening of the waters" as the ice on the lakes began to melt, reporting in his letter to MacCallum that the ice would "break up [on] the first good wind, so I will soon be camping again." This ice is apparent in the sketch River, which was likely painted early in the season and preceding Spring Ice. The close of the day is indicated by the turquoise, yellow and lavender sky.

The year overall was particularly productive for Thomson, himself reporting that he had painted 128 sketches by September. He began to more consistently use hard wood-pulp board for sketching, something he picked up from J. E. H. MacDonald. From April through July, he spent much of his time fishing, assisting groups on several different lakes. He spent much of his summer travelling across the province, hunting and sketching. From the end of September to mid-October, Thomson spent his time at Mowat, a village on the north end of Canoe Lake. By November he was at Round Lake with Tom Wattie and Dr. Robert McComb. In late November Thomson returned to Toronto and moved into a shack behind the Studio Building that Harris and MacCallum fixed up for him, renting it for $1 a month (equivalent to CAD$27 in 2025). (Note: In his 1959 piece, "My Memories of Tom Thomson," Thoreau MacDonald (son of J. E. H. MacDonald) cited November 1915 as when Thomson moved into the shack behind the Studio Building. Most sources agree with this, including Charles Hill, William Little and Addison & Harwood. David Silcox has written that the move happened in either late 1914 or early 1915.)

== Description ==
Spring Ice is among the dozen or so paintings expanded from a small sketch into a larger canvas work. The smaller sketches were done en plein air—in this case likely painted a little north of Hayhurst's Point on Canoe Lake—through the spring, summer and fall. The larger canvases were instead completed over the winter in Thomson's studio—an old utility shack with a wood-burning stove on the grounds of the Studio Building, an artist's enclave in Rosedale, Toronto.

=== Sketch (spring 1915) ===
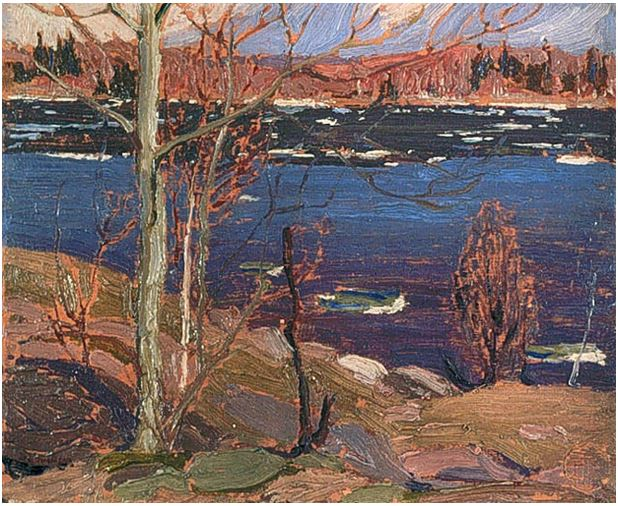
The Opening of the Rivers: Sketch for "Spring Ice", Spring 1915. Oil on composite wood-pulp board, 21.6 × 26.7 cm. National Gallery of Canada, Ottawa

Curator Charles Hill has written that the Sketch for Spring Ice was almost certainly done with A. Y. Jackson's 1914 canvas A Frozen Lake in mind. (Note: Under the National Gallery of Canada, Jackson's painting is instead known as Frozen Lake, Early Spring, Algonquin Park. Curator Charles Hill has noted that this is a common mistake arising due to the two paintings A Frozen Lake and Early Spring, Algonquin Park being exhibited next to one another in 1914. Frozen Lake, Early Spring, Algonquin Park is a combination of the two titles.) Thomson likely saw the painting in November 1914 before Jackson took it away in December to be exhibited. The composition recalls Thomson's earlier work from his design career, using a group of trees in the foreground to establish a lake and low-lying hills in the background. By 1914 Thomson was displaying an increasing interest in the motifs of both ice breaking up on a river as well as rock in the lower foreground. In these earlier examples, the foreground tends to cut a diagonal across the painting while the trees subtly obscure the far shore. A. Y. Jackson experimented with this idea in his own 1914 painting, Lake Shore, Canoe Lake. In the Sketch for Spring Ice, a gentler rise to the left instead establishes the foreground with only a few brushstrokes used to paint the brown ground. Charles Hill has further written that, "the relationship of foreground, middle and distance is more fluid than in Northern River, opening the view of the water and far shore."

=== Canvas (winter 1915–16) ===
The final canvas for Spring Ice shares similarities to In the Northland, another work produced over the same winter. A key difference is that Spring Ice emphasizes the horizontal, seen with both the foreground, lake and hills existing in bands stacked on top of one another, and further emphasized by the open space and the trees being placed on the far left and right of the foreground.

While the sketch utilizes "muddy, warm tones," the canvas instead uses brighter, more highly keyed colours. The brighter greens, pinks, yellows, blues and whites are not too striking, with a pale blue lightly put on top of the final work to lower the overall contrast. The different regions of colour are readily apparent within the foreground. In the background, terra cotta is painted over with blue.

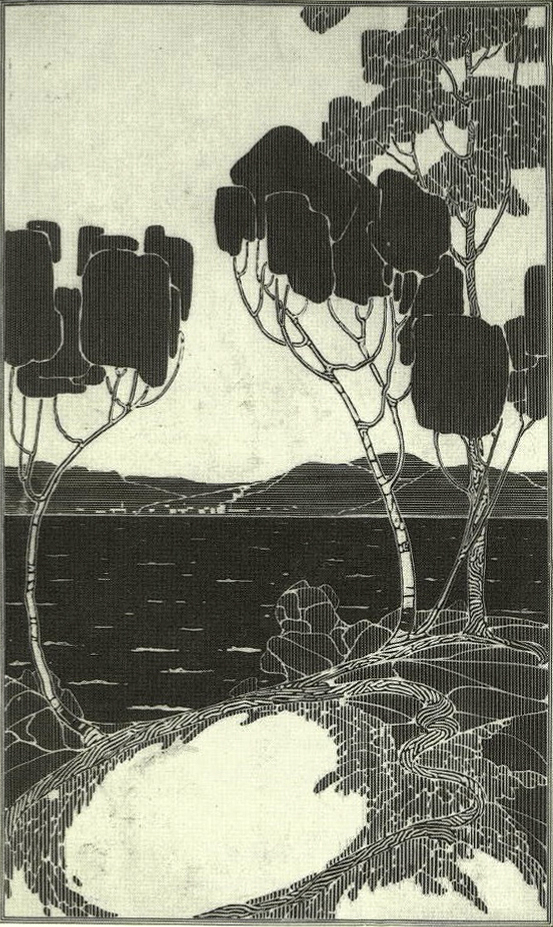
Advertising or calendar drawing, Fall–winter 1912. Location unknown

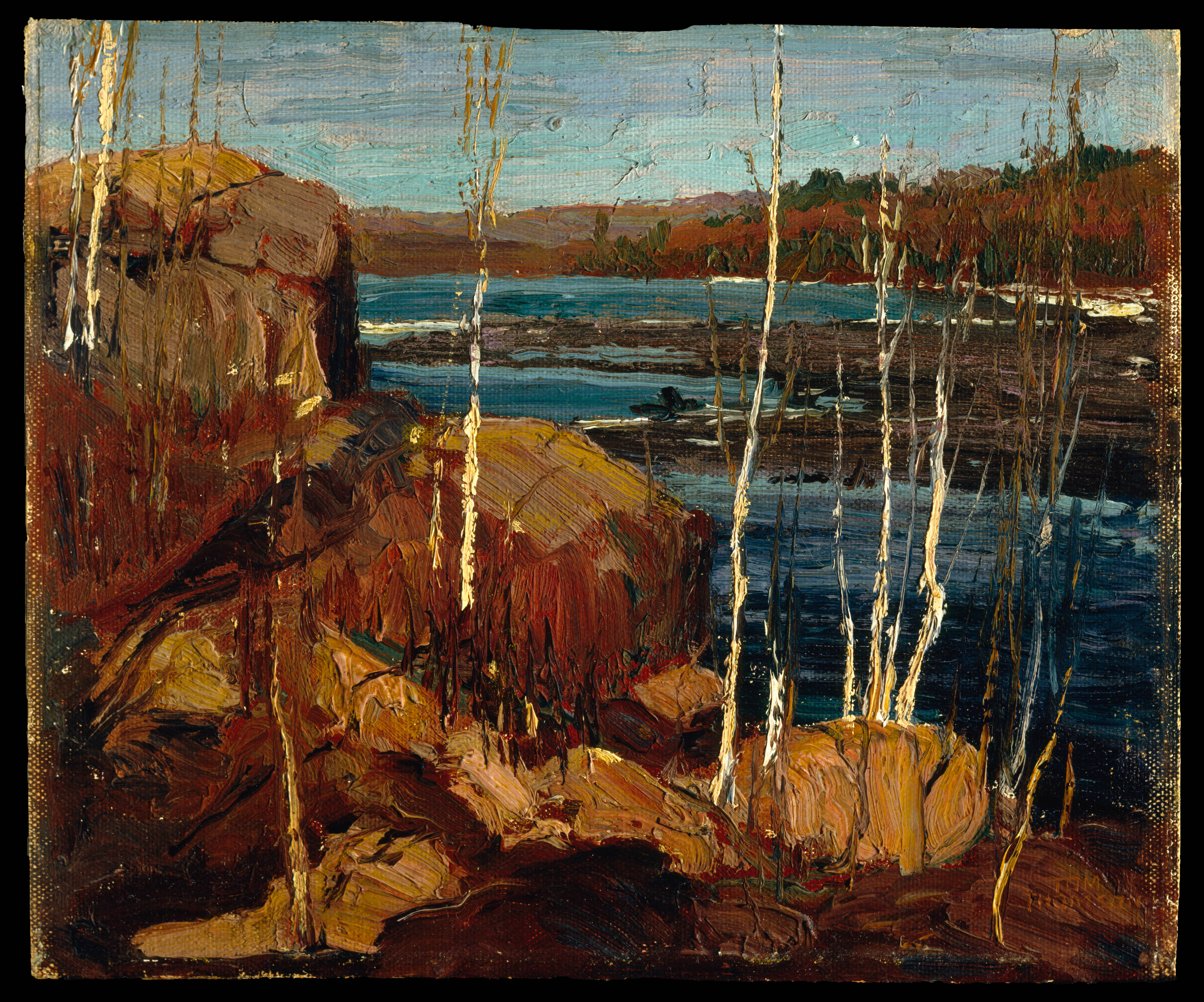
Spring, Spring 1914. McMichael Canadian Art Collection, Kleinburg

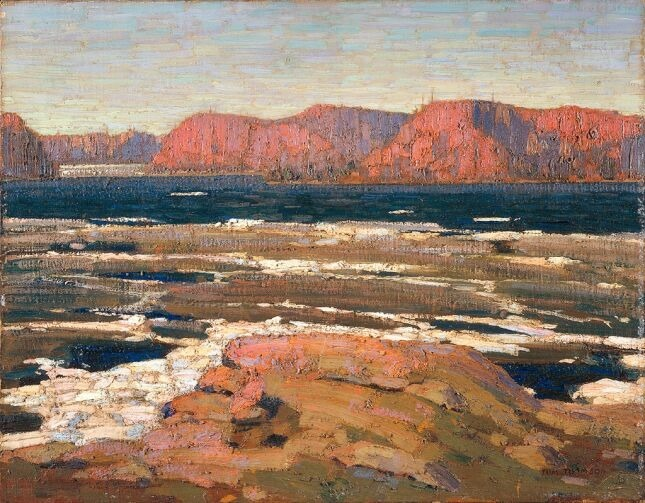
Petawawa Gorges (Early Spring), Winter 1914–15 National Gallery of Canada, Ottawa

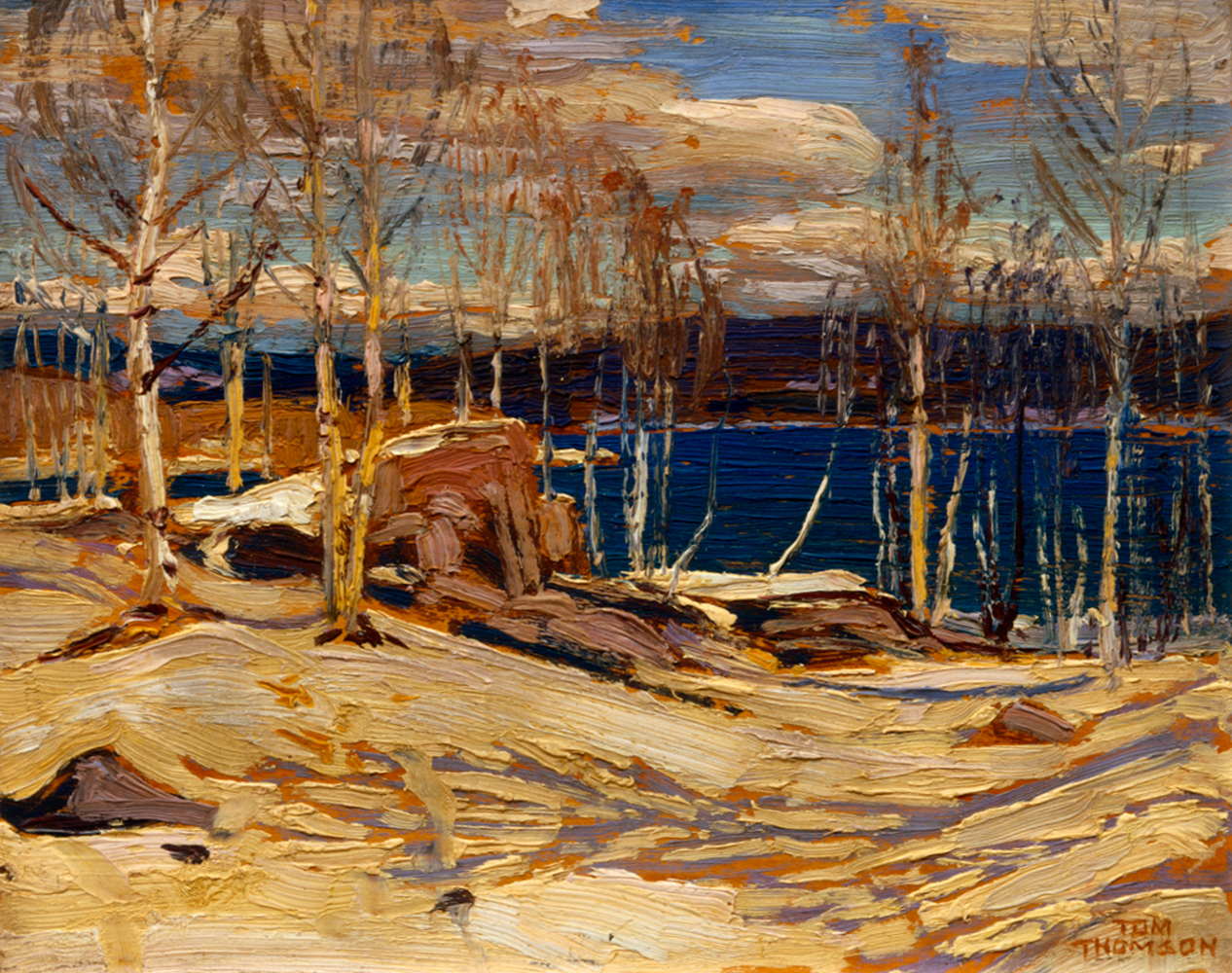
Spring Ice, Spring 1915. Private collection

== Provenance and exhibition ==
In March and April 1916 Thomson exhibited Spring Ice and three canvases with the Ontario Society of Artists (OSA). The other paintings were In the Northland (at that time, titled The Birches), Moonlight and October (then titled The Hardwoods), all of which were painted over the winter of 1915–16. Sir Edmund Walker and Eric Brown of the National Gallery of Canada wanted to purchase In the Northland, but Montreal trustee Dr. Francis Shepherd convinced them to instead purchase Spring Ice. They bought it for $300 (equivalent to CAD$7,400 in 2025).

Reception to Thomson's paintings at this time were mixed. Margaret Fairbairn of the Toronto Daily Star wrote, "Mr. Tom Thomson's 'The Birches' and 'The Hardwoods' show a fondness for intense yellows and orange and strong blue, altogether a fearless use of violent colour which can scarcely be called pleasing, and yet which seems an exaggeration of a truthful feeling that time will temper." A more favourable take came from artist Wyly Grier in The Christian Science Monitor:

Tom Thomson again reveals his capacity to be modern and remain individual. His early pictures—in which the quality of naivete had all the genuineness of the effort of the tyro and was not the counterfeit of it which is so much in evidence in the intensely rejuvenated works of the highly sophisticated—showed the faculty for affectionate and truthful record by a receptive eye and faithful hand; but his work today has reached higher levels of technical accomplishment. His Moonlight, Spring Ice and The Birches are among his best.

In The Canadian Courier, painter Estelle Kerr similarly spoke positively, describing Thomson as "one of the most promising of Canadian painters who follows the impressionist movement and his work reveals himself to be a fine colourist, a clever technician, and a truthful interpreter of the north land in its various aspects.

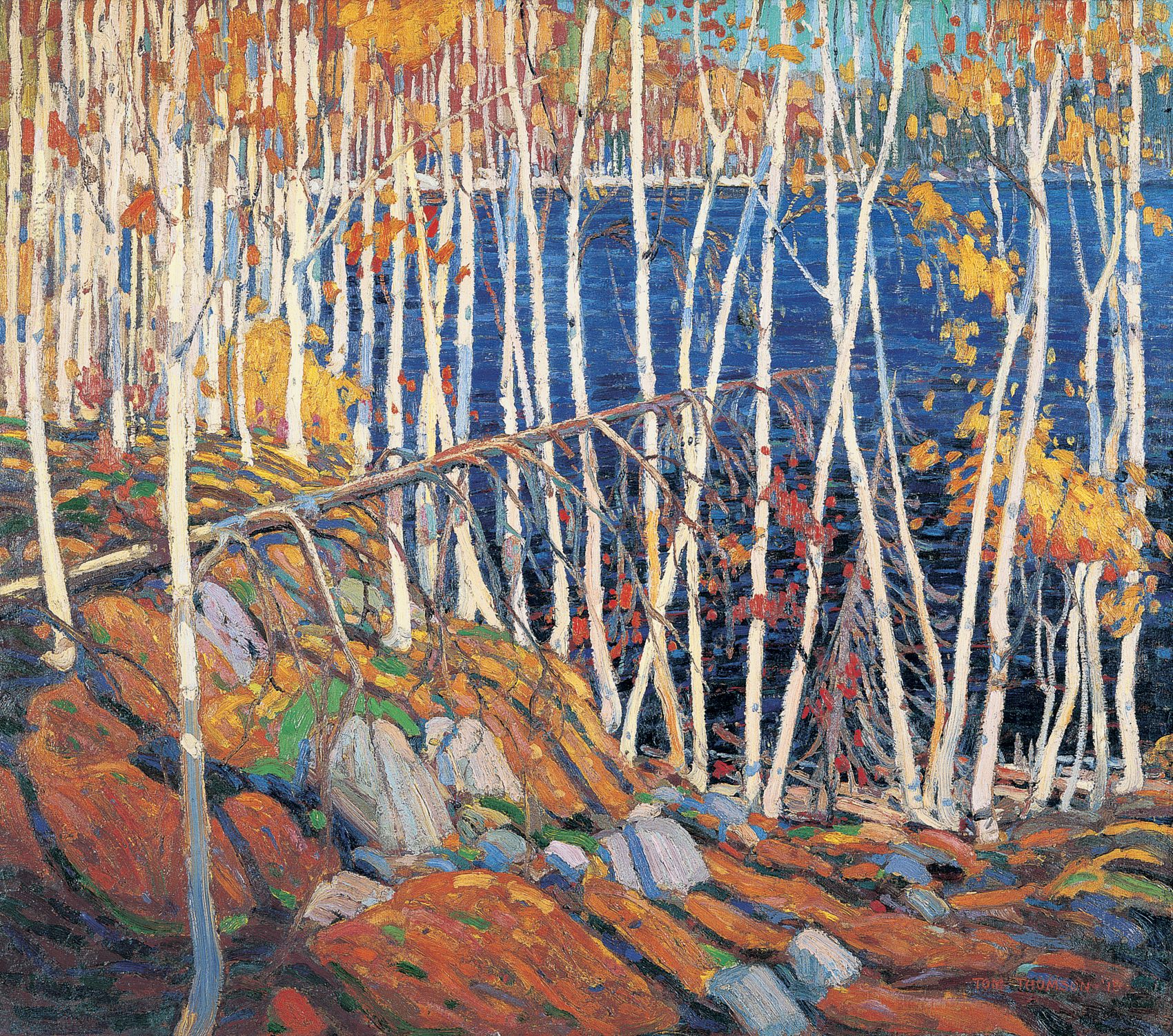
In the Northland, Winter 1915–16. Montreal Museum of Fine Arts, Montreal

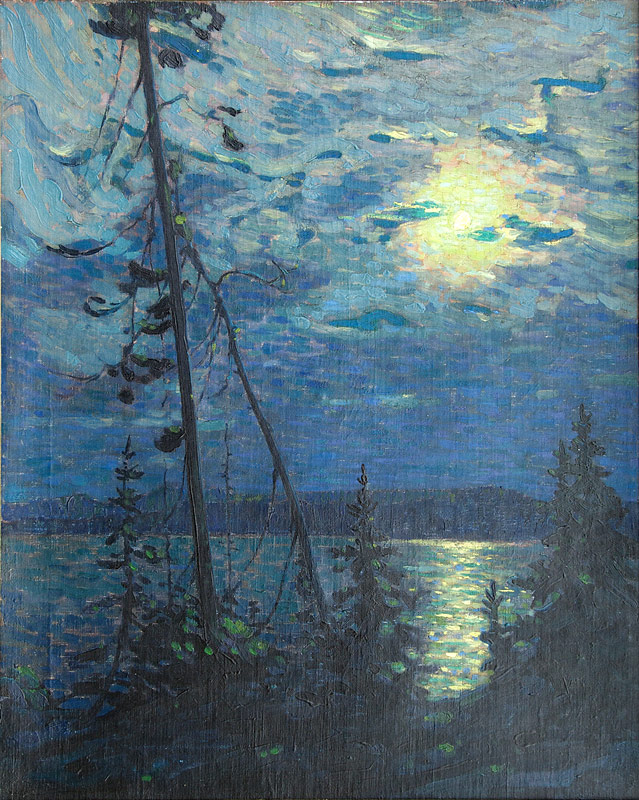
Moonlight, Winter 1915–16. Private collection, Stellarton

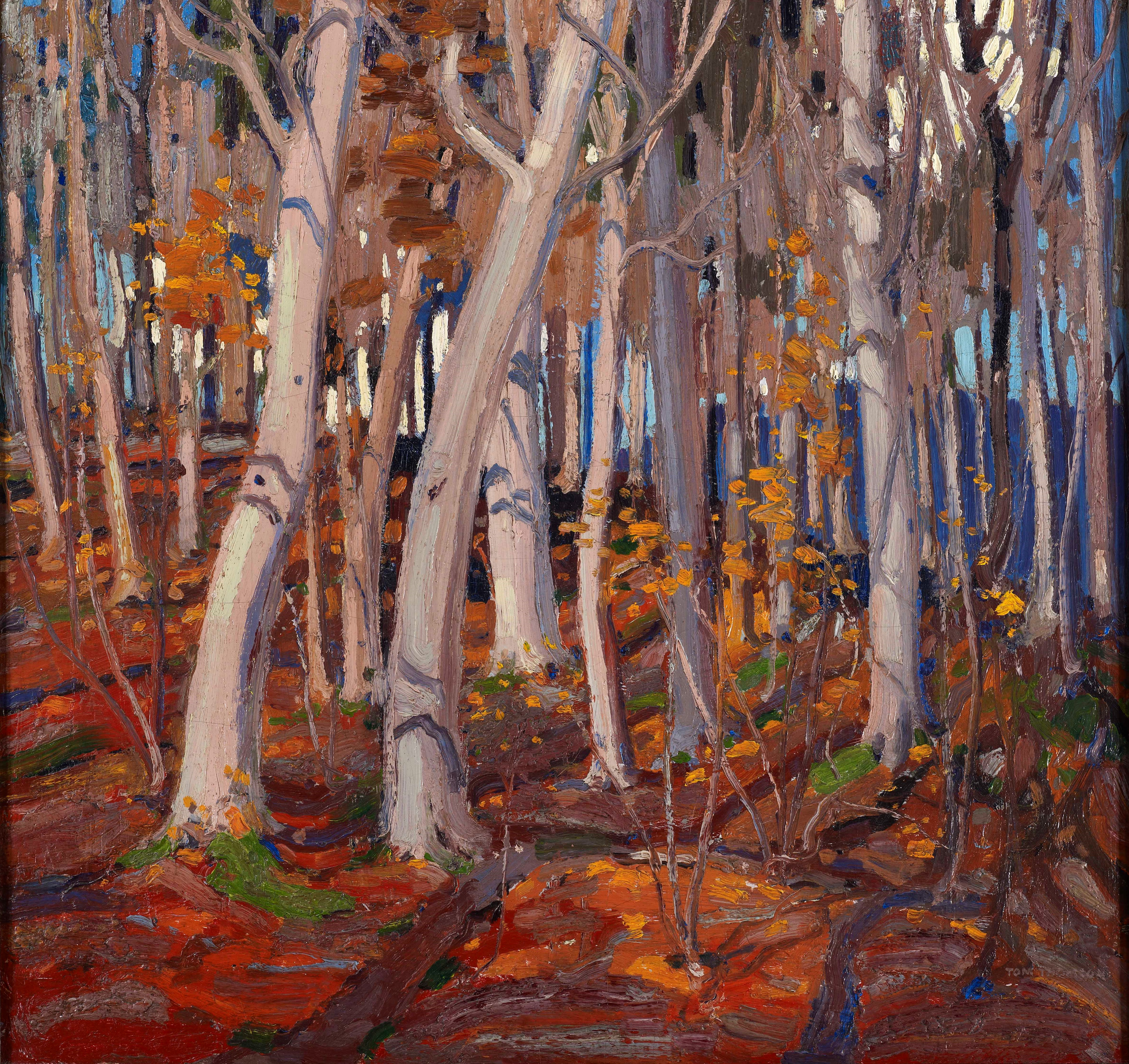
October, Winter 1915–16. Private collection
