= The West Wind (painting) =

Painting by Tom Thomson

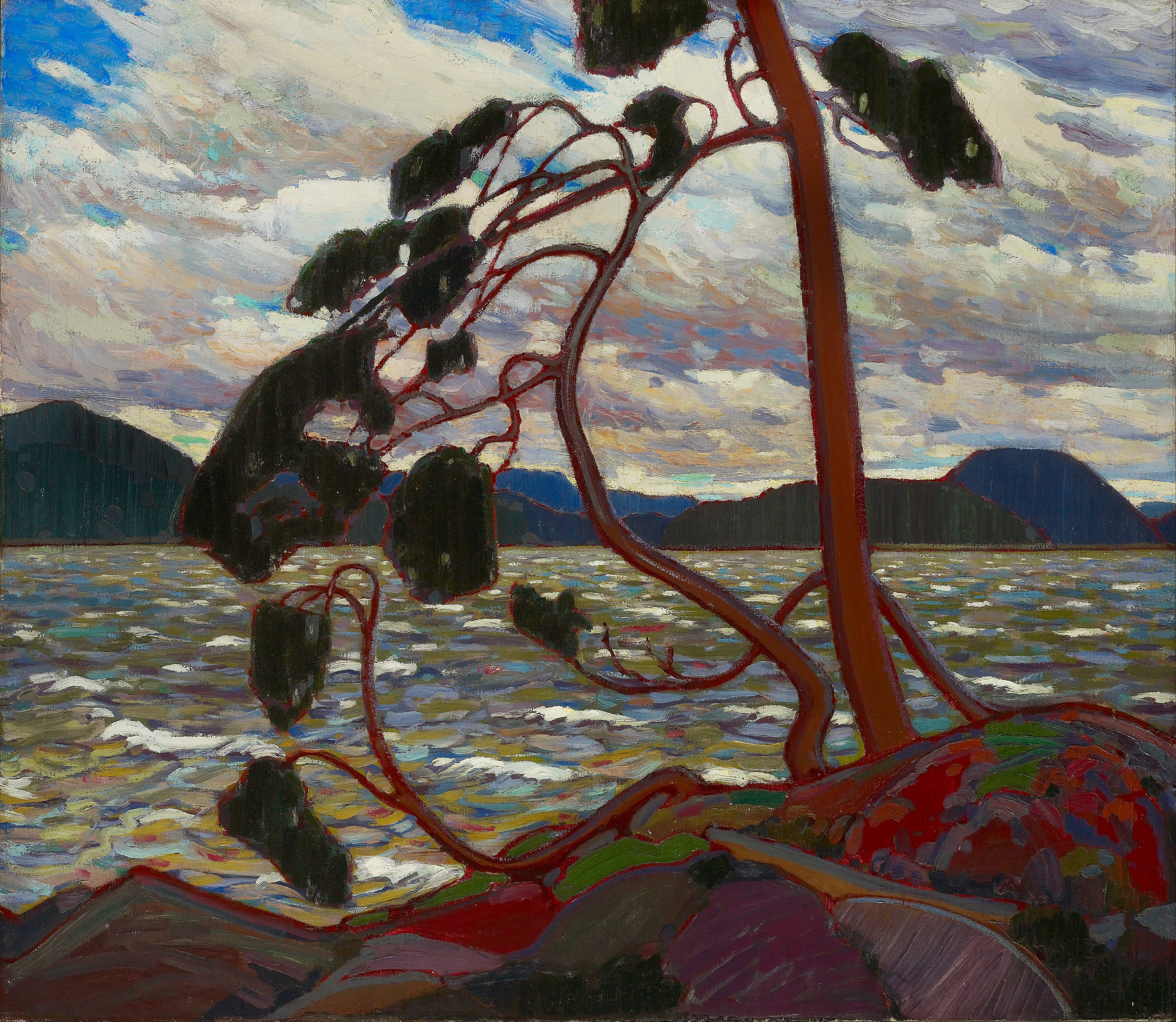
- Artist: Tom Thomson
- Year: 1917
- Medium: Oil on canvas
- Dimensions: 120.7 cm × 137.2 cm (47.5 in × 54.0 in)
- Location: Art Gallery of Ontario; Toronto

The West Wind is a 1917 painting by Canadian artist Tom Thomson. An iconic image, the pine tree at its centre has been described as growing "in the national ethos as our one and only tree in a country of trees". It was painted in the last year of Thomson's life and was one of his final works on canvas. The painting, and a sketch for the painting, are displayed at the Art Gallery of Ontario.

== Genesis ==
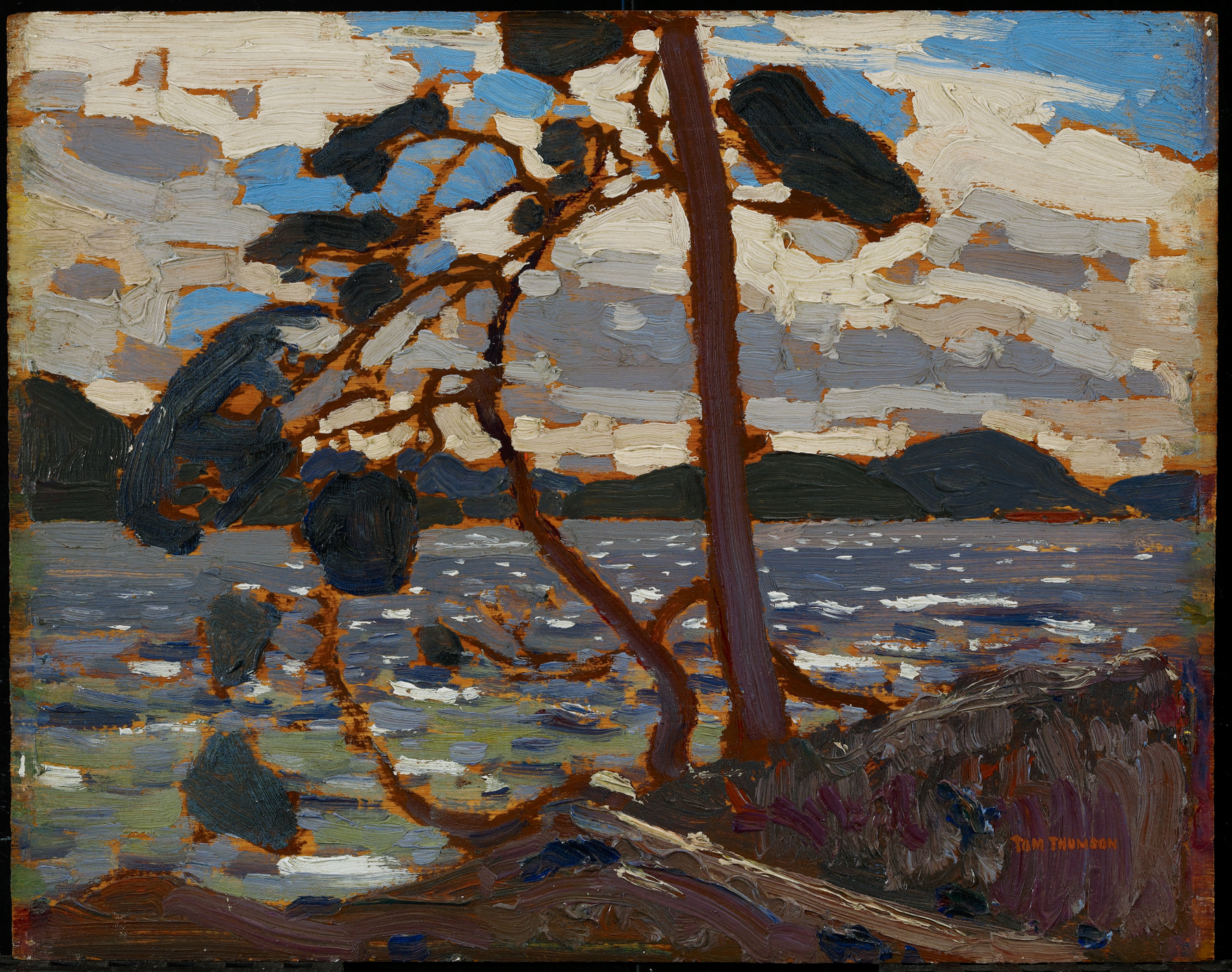
Sketch for The West Wind, Spring 1916, oil on composite wood-pulp board, 21.4 × 26.8 cm, Art Gallery of Ontario, Toronto

Thomson based The West Wind on an earlier, slightly different sketch he produced in 1916 while working as a park ranger in Algonquin Park. In the finished canvas Thomson moved the pine further to the right, replaced a less defined foreground plane with strongly patterned rock shapes, and removed a dead tree limb from the ground. The location of the subject is uncertain; Thomson's friend Winifred Trainor believed the site represented was Cedar Lake, though Grand Lake, Algonquin Park has also been proposed as the setting.

As in his iconic The Jack Pine, Thomson began the painting with an undercoat of vermilion that he allowed to show through in various places to contrast with the greens, to lend the work a feeling of "vibration" and movement. The pine dominates the composition without obscuring the view into the distance, and is successful as both specific representation and abstract design.

Though not imposing in scale, it is a graceful arabesque decoration, "a magnified bonsai". Thomson's background in design lent his composition an Art Nouveau sensibility, for example, "in the way a single tree stands silhouetted against water or the sky like a symbol of romantic solitude". An earlier reviewer noticed the same effect in it and The Jack Pine: "[these] two best-known canvases ... are essentially Art Nouveau designs in the flat, the principal motif in each case being a tree drawn in great sinuous curves ... Such pictures, are, however, saved from complete stylization by the use of uncompromisingly native subject-matter and of Canadian colours, the glowing colours of autumn."

The title of The West Wind is possibly a reference to the 1819 Percy Bysshe Shelley poem, Ode to the West Wind, especially possible given Thomson's love of poetry, though Thomson's later canvases are typically believed to have only been titled after his death.

== Pedigree and legacy ==
According to Trainor, Thomson was not satisfied with the picture, fearing that the flat abstract shapes of the foreground rocks and trees were inconsistent with the atmospheric conception of the background. Thomson's colleague J. E. H. MacDonald felt similarly, describing the painting as "faulty and inconsistent." Curator Charles Hill has noted that the tension arises due to the trunk of the tree being "unmodulated and outlined in a darker colour" and the foreground rocks being blocked schematically, all while the sky and water "are treated with a feathery touch." Despite these shortcomings, he would still write that the painting surges with an energy due to its boldness and directness. Thomson's other colleague Arthur Lismer would be more positive in his appraisal, writing that the tree in The West Wind was symbolic of the national character — models of resolve against the elements. David Silcox has described this painting and The Jack Pine as, "the visual equivalent of a national anthem, for they have come to represent the spirit of the whole country, notwithstanding the fact that vast tracts of Canada have no pine trees," and, "so majestic and memorable that nearly everyone knows them." Thomson biographer and curator Joan Murray, while initially disliking the painting, wrote that it "is a powerful canvas; resonating with its message of weather and wind, it expressed the divine as some of us imagine it in Canada. This is the sort of tree that would stand at the gates of heaven to open the doors of the kingdom." Thomson's friend and patron Dr. James MacCallum would write that the painting's "inartistic reality makes me tell you that on that occasion the wind was north."

Some art historians claim the painting was unfinished at the time of his sudden death by drowning in 1917.

The Canadian Club of Toronto donated The West Wind to the recently opened Art Gallery of Toronto (now the Art Gallery of Ontario). Librarian George Locke, a club member, announced the donation in a speech, praising Thomson's accomplishments: "Thomson needs no tablet to commemorate his achievements ... He has left us work that expresses our national life – the forces of the great natural surroundings of this young land."

On the fiftieth anniversary of Thomson's death, the Canadian government honoured him with a series of stamps portraying his works, including The West Wind and The Jack Pine. On 3 May 1990 Canada Post issued 'The West Wind, Tom Thomson, 1917' in the Masterpieces of Canadian art series. The stamp was designed by Pierre-Yves Pelletier based on the large painting in the Art Gallery of Ontario.

In 2015, the Art Gallery of Ontario held an exhibition titled Into the Woods: an Icon Revisited, focusing on the wider social and historical context of Algonquin Park. It stressed that even in Thomson's time, the landscape of Algonquin Park was by no means unspoiled wilderness but had been dramatically reshaped by colonization, industry and wildlife management.
