= The Jack Pine =

Painting by Tom Thomson

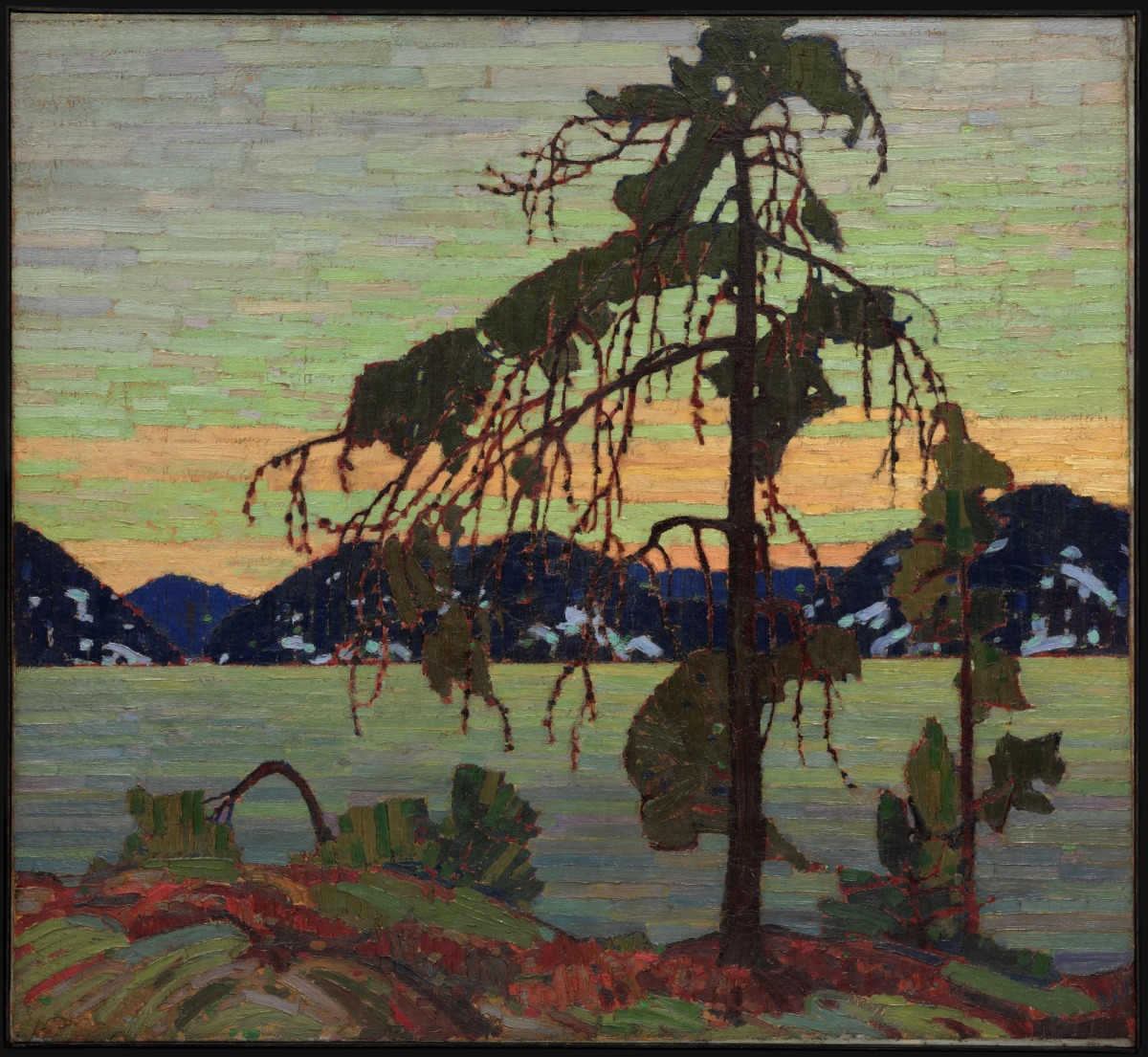
Tom Thomson, The Jack Pine (1916–17). Oil on canvas; 127.9 × 139.8 cm. National Gallery of Canada, Ottawa

The Jack Pine is a well-known oil painting by Canadian artist Tom Thomson. A representation of the most broadly distributed pine species in Canada, it is considered an iconic image of the country's landscape, and is one of the country's most widely recognized and reproduced artworks.

The painting was completed in 1917, the year of Thomson's death. It is a roughly square canvas that measures 127.9 × 139.8 cm. It has been in the collection of the National Gallery of Canada in Ottawa since 1918.

== Background ==
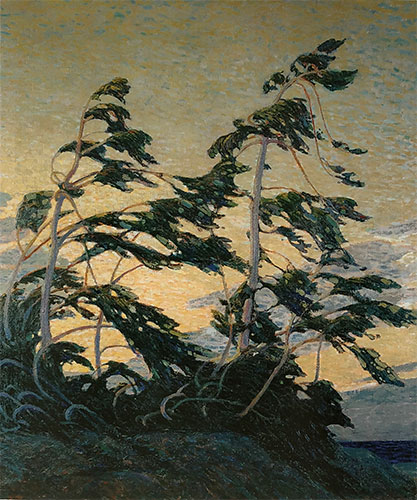
Foreground trees and a distant body of water form a common motif in Thomson's work. In this regard Pine Island, Georgian Bay (1914–1916) is a precursor to The Jack Pine and The West Wind.

Beginning in 1913, Thomson annually stayed in Algonquin Park from the spring until the autumn, often working as a guide while also fishing and painting for his own pleasure. In 1916, he also worked in the Park as a fire ranger. It was there, on Grand Lake with the hills near Carcajou Bay in the background, that Thomson made the oil sketch in 1916 that he would use for the final painting in 1917. There are numerous other paintings by Thomson with compositions similar to that of The Jack Pine: in fact, the majority of Thomson's canvasses depict the far side of a shore. These include Northern Lake (1912–13), his first; Pine Island, Georgian Bay (1914–1916; pictured); and more famously, The West Wind (1917), another painting of iconic status.

== Description ==
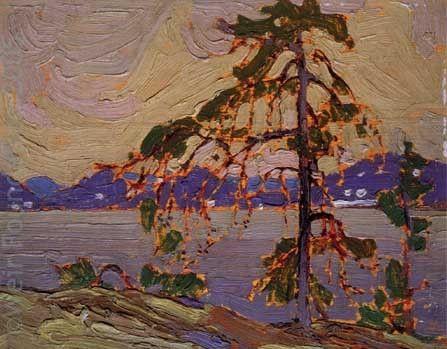
Thomson's spring 1916 sketch for The Jack Pine. Oil on panel; 21.1 x 26.8 cm. RiverBrink Art Museum, Queenston, Canada (purchased 1947).

The painting depicts a jack pine as a decorative and abstracted pattern, its shapes boldly simplified against the sunset. This stylization demonstrates Thomson's command of decorative effects, developed during his years as a graphic designer, and with the strong colour and value contrasts, creates the picture's symbolic resonance. The pine, its branches bowed and placed to the right of centre, extends nearly the full length of the canvas, and is cropped at the top. It rises from a rocky foreground; the hardy jack pine often takes root on shores hostile to other trees, its sparsely leaved branches forming eccentric shapes. It is silhouetted against water and sky, with the canvas bisected by the far shore.

The final canvas differs markedly from Thomson's spring 1916 sketch. He made the tree appear larger by lowering the hills on the far side of the lake. The weather had been stormy when Thomson made the sketch and the dark, rolling clouds were echoed in the heavy, swirling brushwork of the sky and the slate grey lake. In the final painting, Thomson has swapped the storm clouds for a clear twilight sky. The sky and lake are now highly stylized, painted in long horizontal brushstrokes that show, along with its nearly square format, the influence of Thomson's colleague Lawren Harris.

Thomson began with a vermilion red undertone, which he likely chose to avoid mixing the complementary colours red and green. The red was allowed to show through in parts of the tree, foreground landscape, and hills, making the colour "[seem] to vibrate".

Yet the focal point of the painting is not in the foreground, but at the distant shore—the patch of snow just below the centre of the canvas. Dennis Reid, who wrote a booklet on the painting for the National Gallery, points out an almost circular shape made by the foreground elements that encompass the focal point. The circle is formed from the large curving branches of the tree, the sloping left foreground, and the smaller tree at right. Reid writes that this near-circle "exists in space more like a ball, and as we peer through that ball to the opposite shore, for an instant we're inside our eye."

Thomson's background in design lent his composition an Art-Nouveau sensibility. One reviewer notes the effect in it and The West Wind: "[these] two best-known canvases ... are essentially Art Nouveau designs in the flat, the principal motif in each case being a tree drawn in great sinuous curves ... Such pictures, are, however, saved from complete stylization by the use of uncompromisingly native subject-matter and of Canadian colours, the glowing colours of autumn."

According to A. Y. Jackson, Thomson was dissatisfied with the canvas, particularly the background and sky.

== Interpretation ==
Tom Thomson had little to say about The Jack Pine or his painting in general. The Jack Pine, a stylized landscape with few elements—painted by a man who died the year he painted it, a man who would become an icon in his country—has encouraged various readings of Thomson's artistic motivations. Dennis Reid observes the limitations of received views of such popular artworks: "The Jack Pine, is, after all, like all successful works of art a living thing that grows or declines, unfolds or closes up, according to the nature and the quality of the attention it receives. In that sense, there are as many meanings as there are viewers."

Blodwen Davies was the first biographer of Thomson, and a Theosophist. Emphasizing the "spirit" of the painting, she wrote in 1935, "the spirit of the canvas leaps out to meet the spectator in a way no reproduction can fully convey. There is no fumbling, no hesitancy here ... [Thomson's] brush was sure. Heavily laden with paint it swept over the canvas in broad, exultant strokes in which the very spirit of Tom Thomson still speaks aloud." Another Theosophist, Fred Housser, described the painting in 1926 as "a devotional meditative study. A single tree stands spreading the tracery of its limbs and branches like the pulsating veins of Mother Nature ... [One] could believe that this tree was to the nature-worshipper Thomson what the symbol of the cross was to a mediaeval mystic."

Thomson was an important influence on the Group of Seven, with members such as Lawren Harris advocating his work. In a review of the Art Gallery of Toronto's Inaugural Exhibition of 1926, Harris dismissed much of the American art shown there, writing that most of it "represented the average of the academies... no one of these canvasses approaches Thomson's The West Wind or Jack Pine in devotion and greatness of spirit." Those two paintings, he wrote, "contain the lasting qualities of the best old masters. The devotional mood of The Jack Pine is the same as in Giovanni Bellini's Madonna and Child".

Arthur Lismer, also part of the Group of Seven, commented on Thomson's painting. Writing in 1930, he stated that The Jack Pine was a work of "significant form ... The artist thinks of big things first – and the design in this picture is the biggest thing in it. It is like a symphony of music. All the instruments are playing a part, and none is out of harmony with the whole ... the theme of a painting is a movement in space. The upright lines of the tree trunk give it serenity; the horizontal lines of the shore supplement this and give it strength; the rounded masses of the hills repeat the circular rhythm of the foliage masses, giving movement and powerful rhythm to the whole composition."

Peter Mellen, author of The Group of Seven (1970), wrote of the work's "perfect serenity. It is evening – the sky and lake are perfectly calm and are painted in broad, flat horizontal strokes. Even the soft mauves, pinks, and greens contribute to this effect. Countering the strong horizontals are the drooping red tendrils of the bare pine branches, the vertical lines of the trees, and the curves of the hills ... [Thomson] achieves pure poetry in painting, by combining an intuitive feeling for nature with an almost classical control of technique." A year later, Jean Boggs proposed that Thomson was influenced by the European Symbolists: "against the dying light and sky the scraggly forms of The Jack Pine are most dramatic, its branches struggling to life but dominated by dark-green, tattered, bat-like forms as if the tree were a symbol – beautiful, oriental, but a symbol nevertheless of Thomson's wish for his own death on this spot." Others considered the painting evidence that Thomson was, or might have become, an increasingly abstract or Expressionist artist.

== Provenance and exhibition ==
The National Gallery of Canada in Ottawa has held the work since shortly after its creation. During his wilderness travels, Thomson likely stored The Jack Pine in his shack behind the Studio Building. In late 1917, Dr. James MacCallum, Thomson's patron, put it and a few other works by Thomson on display at the Arts and Letters Club. Representatives of the National Gallery visited the club on two occasions in the spring of 1918. The museum wished to add to its existing collection of three works by Thomson. Director Eric Brown was appalled on his first visit at the poor lighting provided the paintings. For the second visit, May 2, the display had been improved, and the director and his associate chose The Jack Pine (along with Thomson's Autumn Garland and 25 sketches) for the National Gallery. Brown wrote to a colleague that The Jack Pine was "in our opinion, and that of Thomson's fellow painters, the best picture of any kind he ever painted."

Two months after The Jack Pine arrived in Ottawa in August 1918, it was sent to St. Louis, Missouri, as part of an exhibition of contemporary Canadian art. It circulated until 1919, and only in February 1920 was the painting first displayed in Canada, as part of a Thomson memorial exhibition. In the next five decades it would be displayed widely, in Europe (London, Paris, Ghent), and across Canada and the United States.

The Jack Pine was included in an exhibition of Thomson's work that travelled across Canada in 2003, organized by the National Gallery and the Art Gallery of Ontario. It was then shown at the Hermitage Museum in Russia in 2004.

== Legacy ==
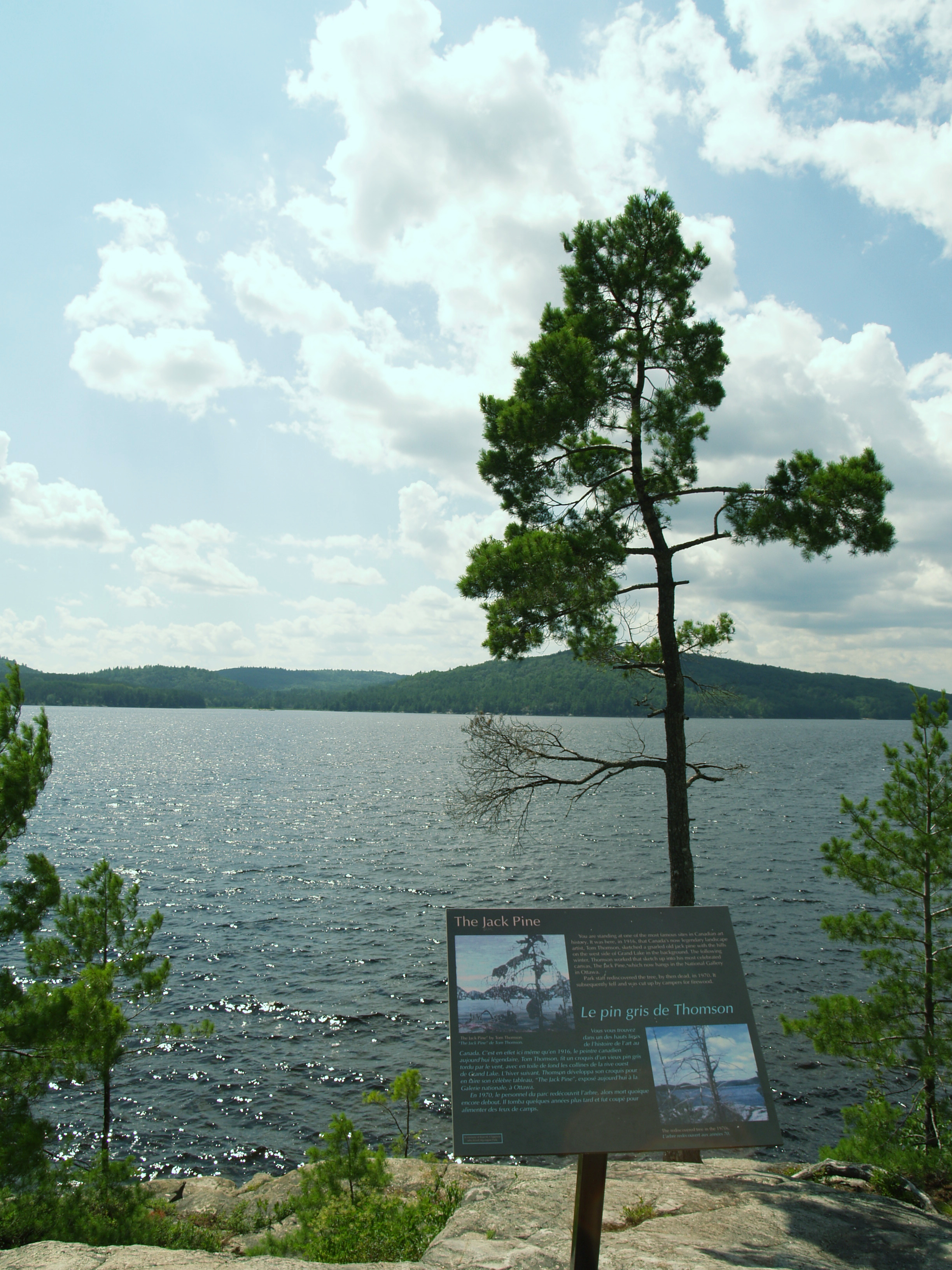
The site of Thomson's sketch for the painting, photographed in 2007

The Jack Pine, with other works by Thomson, has become an iconic representation of the Canadian landscape. Thomson's life and mysterious death is a popular subject of Canadian biography and poetry. Even The Jack Pine is a title referent in a few poems, including Henry Beissel's "Tom Thomson's Jackpine" and Doug Barbour's "Tom Thomson's 'The Jack Pine' (1916–1917)". Beissel's poem concludes:

... the light is at peace with the tree and the lake.
Calmly it amplifies the beryline silence brooding
on the waters where Tom's spirit rests forever
alongside the sky stretched out in the shadow
of the jackpine that holds heaven and earth
together in an embrace encompassing the hills
the lake, the seasons, and the void that fills
the dark spaces between them and infinity.

The painting has been widely reproduced, seen across Canada in schools and public institutions. In 1967, a stamp featuring The Jack Pine was released to coincide with the fiftieth anniversary of the painting's creation and Thomson's death.

The pine depicted in the painting was located by park staff in 1970. The tree was already dead by the time of its discovery; it later fell over and was used for firewood by campers. A lookout at Grand Lake now marks the site of the painting with a plaque that notes the significance of Thomson's work and depicts the painting alongside a photograph of the scene from the 1970s, before the tree fell.

The painting was the inspiration for Lone Pine Sunset by author and artist Douglas Coupland, an installation located at Parliament station of the Ottawa O-Train.
