= Marc-Aurèle de Foy Suzor-Coté =

French Canadian painter and sculptor

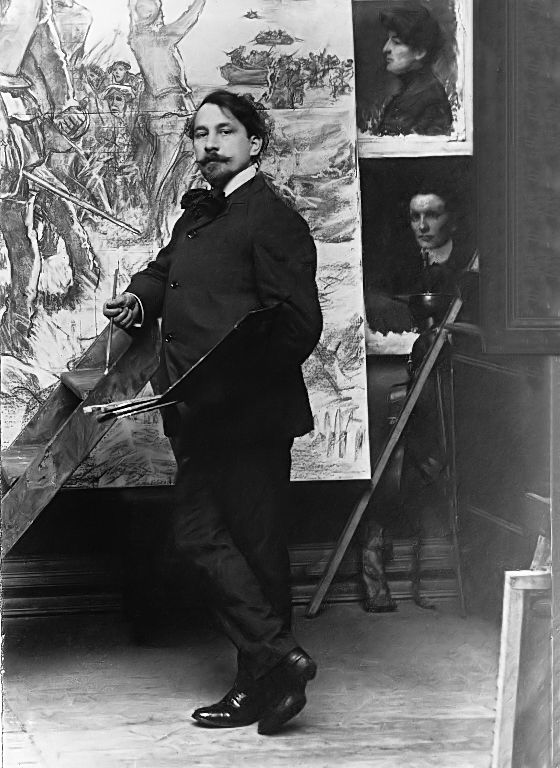
- Suzor-Côté in his studio (McCord Museum)
- Born: Hypolite Wilfrid Marcaurèle Côté; April 6, 1869; Arthabaska, Quebec
- Died: January 29, 1937 (aged 67); Daytona Beach, Florida
- Education: École des Beaux-Arts in Paris (with Léon Bonnat)
- Known for: Painter, sculptor, church decorator
- Movement: Impressionism
- Spouse: Mathilde Savard (m. 1933)

Marc-Aurèle de Foy Suzor-Coté RCA (French pronunciation: [maʁk oʁɛl də fwa syzɔʁ kɔte]; born Hypolite Wilfrid Marcaurèle Côté; April 6, 1869 – January 29, 1937) was a French Canadian painter and sculptor. He was one of the first native-born Canadian artists whose works were directly influenced by French Impressionism and Post-Impressionism.

== Biography ==
He was born in Arthabaska, Quebec, in 1869 and his father was an artist. He studied at the Collège du Sacré-Coeur in Arthabaska. He was a baritone and studied music at the Conservatory of Music in Paris in 1890, but later in the 1890s, he studied painting and sculpture at the École des Beaux-Arts with Léon Bonnat. At the school, he learned of the work of Swedish sculptor Carl Milles, whose sculptures of indigenous people influenced him. Three years later, after a visit home, he studied painting and sculpture at the Julian and Colarossi Academies. He exhibited his first works in 1894 at the Salon de la Société des Artistes Français. His first fully Impressionist paintings, with broken brushwork and bright colour, were made in Brittany in 1906.

After his return to Quebec in 1908, he established a studio in Montreal, creating paintings with classic interpretations of Canadian landscapes. He produced many Impressionist and even Post-Impressionist paintings of the Quebec landscape, as well as portraits, nudes, historical paintings and later sculptures. In his paintings, he was most interested in the play of light on snow and water, leaving behind optical truth for visual innovations.

He was made an Officer of the Academy of France in 1901 – an honour for a Canadian artist. He was also made a member of the Royal Canadian Academy of Arts and joined the progressive Canadian Art Club. There were numerous exhibitions of his work during his lifetime and afterwards, such as the retrospective of his work organized by the Quebec government in 1929. In 2002, Suzor-Coté, 1869-1937: Light and Matter, co-organized by the Musée du Québec and the National Gallery of Canada, was circulated by the Musée du Québec. This first major retrospective of Suzor-Coté, the first in 75 years, brought together over 140 works.

Suzor-Coté became paralyzed in 1927. In 1929, Suzor-Côté moved to Daytona Beach, Florida, where he died on 29 January 1937.

== Recognition ==
On March 14, 1969, Canada Post issued stamps based on Suzor-Coté's painting Return from the Harvest Field (1903) in the National Gallery of Canada in Ottawa, Ontario. The 13-perforated 50¢ stamps with the inscription 'Suzor-Coté, 1869-1937' were printed by Canadian Bank Note Company, Limited.

== Selected works ==
He produced forty or fifty small bronze Impressionist figures and groups. As of 2020, the Suzor-Coté collection in Ottawa's National Gallery of Canada consists of twenty-eight paintings, ten sculptures and a number of drawings. Return from the Harvest Field was acquired by the National Gallery in 1904. Other Suzor-Coté works in Canada are to be found in Quebec City's Musée national des beaux-arts, the RiverBrink Art Museum, and in private collections.

== Gallery ==
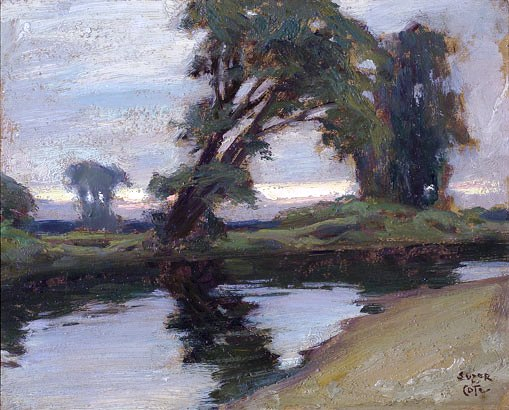
Nicolet River, Arthabaska

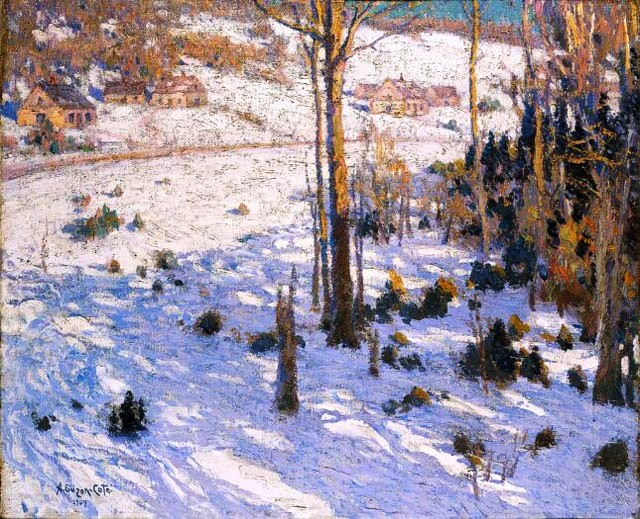
Settlement on the Hillside (1909), Marc-Aurèle de Foy Suzor-Coté

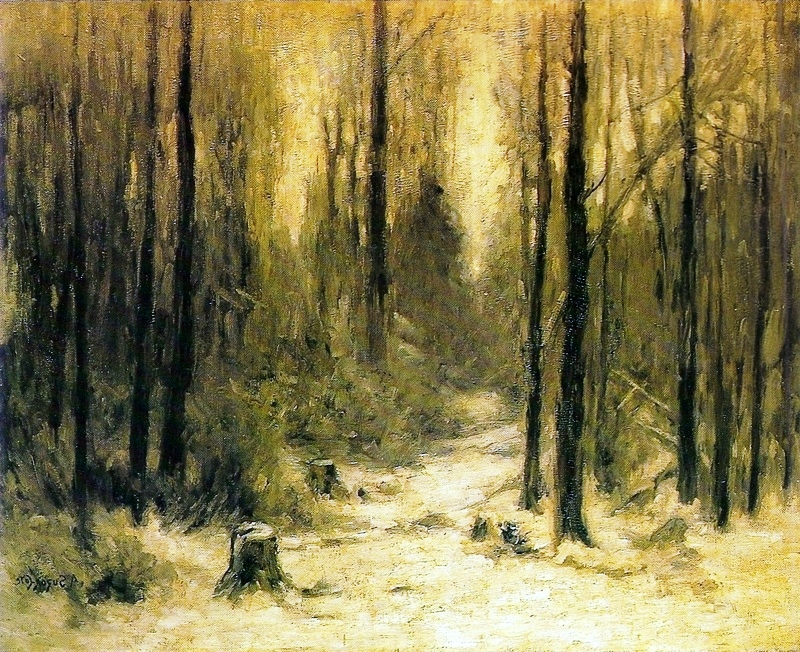
End of the Winter - La Fin de l'hiver Marc-Aurèle de Foy Suzor-Coté at the Museu Nacional de Belas Artes, Rio de Janeiro

La Mort de Montcalm (1902), Musée national des beaux-arts du Québec.

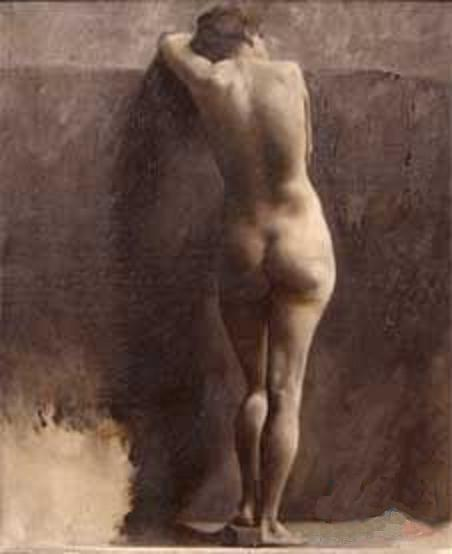
Le Grand Nu (1891?)
