= The Tom Thomson Mystery =

Book by William T. Little

- Author: William T. Little
- Language: English
- Publisher: McGraw-Hill Ryerson
- Publication date: 1970
- Publication place: Canada
- ISBN: 0-07-092655-7

The Tom Thomson Mystery is a book by Canadian judge William T. Little. It was published in 1970 by McGraw-Hill Ryerson.

Tom Thomson is regarded by some as Canada's most famous painter. He died in July 1917, drowning in Canoe Lake in Ontario's Algonquin Park, and was buried there. Two days later, his family sent an undertaker to exhume the body and send it back for re-burial in Leith, Ontario. In October 1956, Little and some friends decided to dig up Thomson's original burial place at Canoe Lake.

The book tells the story of Thomson's life and the discovery made by Little and his friends.

Little's book is one of several that raised the mystery of Tom Thomson’s death to public prominence in the late 1960s and early 1970s.
