= Potter Creek (Nipissing District) =

Potter Creek ruisseau Potter
- Location of the mouth of Potter Creek on a map of Southern Ontario

Location
- Country: Canada
- Province: Ontario
- Region: Northern Ontario
- District: Nipissing District
- Part: Unorganized South Part

Physical characteristics
- Source: Tern Lake
  - coordinates: 45°34′40″N 78°50′13″W
  - elevation: 505 metres (1,657 ft)
- Mouth: Canoe Lake
  - coordinates: 45°34′40″N 78°43′42″W
  - elevation: 417 metres (1,368 ft)

Basin features
- River system: Great Lakes Basin

Potter Creek (French: ruisseau Potter) is a stream in the Unorganized South Part of Nipissing District in Northeastern Ontario, Canada. It is a tributary of Canoe Lake, is in the Lake Huron drainage basin, and lies within Algonquin Provincial Park.

== Course ==
Potter Creek begins at Tern Lake at an elevation of 505 metres (1,657 ft) and heads north to Furrow Lake. It leaves the lake at the north end, takes in the left tributary Brown Creek, and turns north east, curving southeast through Brûlé Lake to Potter Lake. Potter Creek flows south-southeast out of the south end of the lake, crosses the former Ottawa, Arnprior and Parry Sound Railway at the settlement of Canoe Lake, and reaches its mouth at Canoe Lake at an elevation of 417 metres (1,368 ft). Canoe Lake flows via the Oxtongue River, the Lake of Bays, the South Branch Muskoka River, the Muskoka River, Lake Muskoka and the Moon River to Georgian Bay on Lake Huron.
