= Canoe Lake (Nipissing District) =

Lake in Algonquin Provincial Park, Ontario, Canada

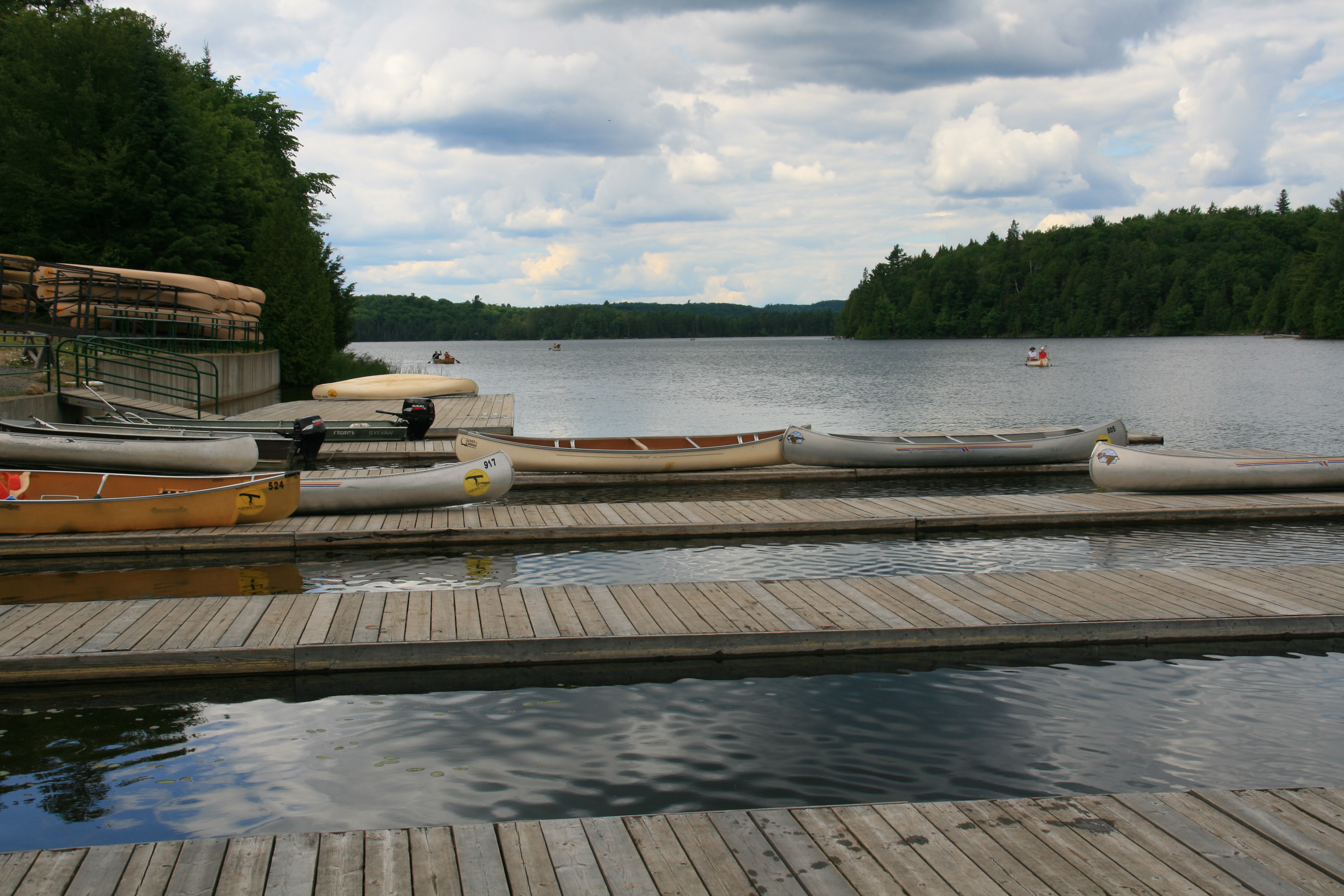

- Canoe Lake in Ontario
- Location: Algonquin Park, Nipissing District, Ontario
- Coordinates: 45°32′56″N 78°43′4″W
- Primary inflows: Potter Creek
- Primary outflows: Oxtongue River
- Basin countries: Canada
- Surface area: 10 km^{2} (3.9 sq mi)
- Shore length^{1}: 21 km (13 mi)
- ^{1} Shore length is not a well-defined measure.

Canoe Lake is a lake located in Algonquin Provincial Park in Nipissing District, Ontario, Canada. Canoe Lake is a major access point for many canoeists entering Algonquin Park as well as being home to many cottages. Important to note is that Canoe Lake is situated on the traditional territory of the Anishinaabeg, specifically the Chippewa, Ojibwa and Potawatomi peoples, under the terms of the Robinson-Huron Treaty #61 of 1850, and the Williams Treaties of 1923.

At km 14.1 of Highway 60 is the short road that leads to the Canoe Lake Access Point for canoe trippers and visitors. The access point consists of a large parking area, a Ministry office to obtain tripping permits for the park interior and the regionally well-known Portage Store. The "P-store" as it is often colloquially known, is a well stocked outfitters and canoe equipment rental operation that includes one of the few commercial restaurants available in Algonquin Park. They serve a variety of meals and offer an ice cream counter as well. The Portage Store also offers a number of outfitting and guiding packages to support peoples' canoe-tripping endeavours. A gift shop is attached offering souvenirs, T-shirts and other items for sale. Canoe Lake is also home to the Taylor-Statten summer camps; Camp Ahmek, an all-boys' camp, and Camp Wapomeo, an all-girls' camp.

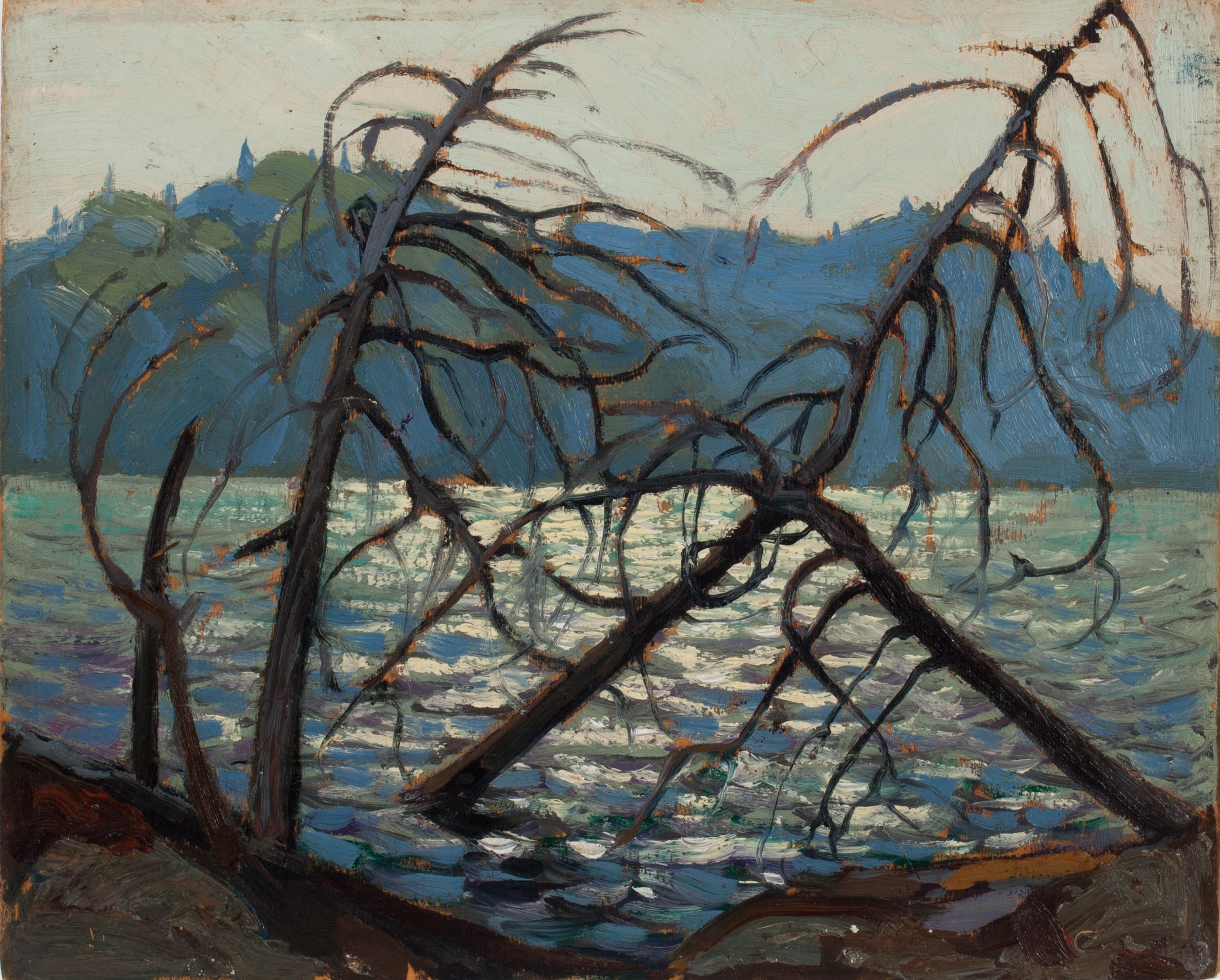
Canoe Lake, 1914 sketch by Tom Thomson

Influential Canadian artist Tom Thomson drowned in Canoe Lake on July 8, 1917, during a canoeing trip; his body was discovered in the lake eight days later, washed up on the Island of Little Wapomeo, the initial home of the summer camp. Canoe Lake was a very influential place for Tom Thomson's artwork, as well as a very special place for him. He resided in Canoe Lake throughout different parts of his career, and frequently canoed the area.

== See also ==
- List of lakes in Ontario
