= List of Robert Burns memorials =

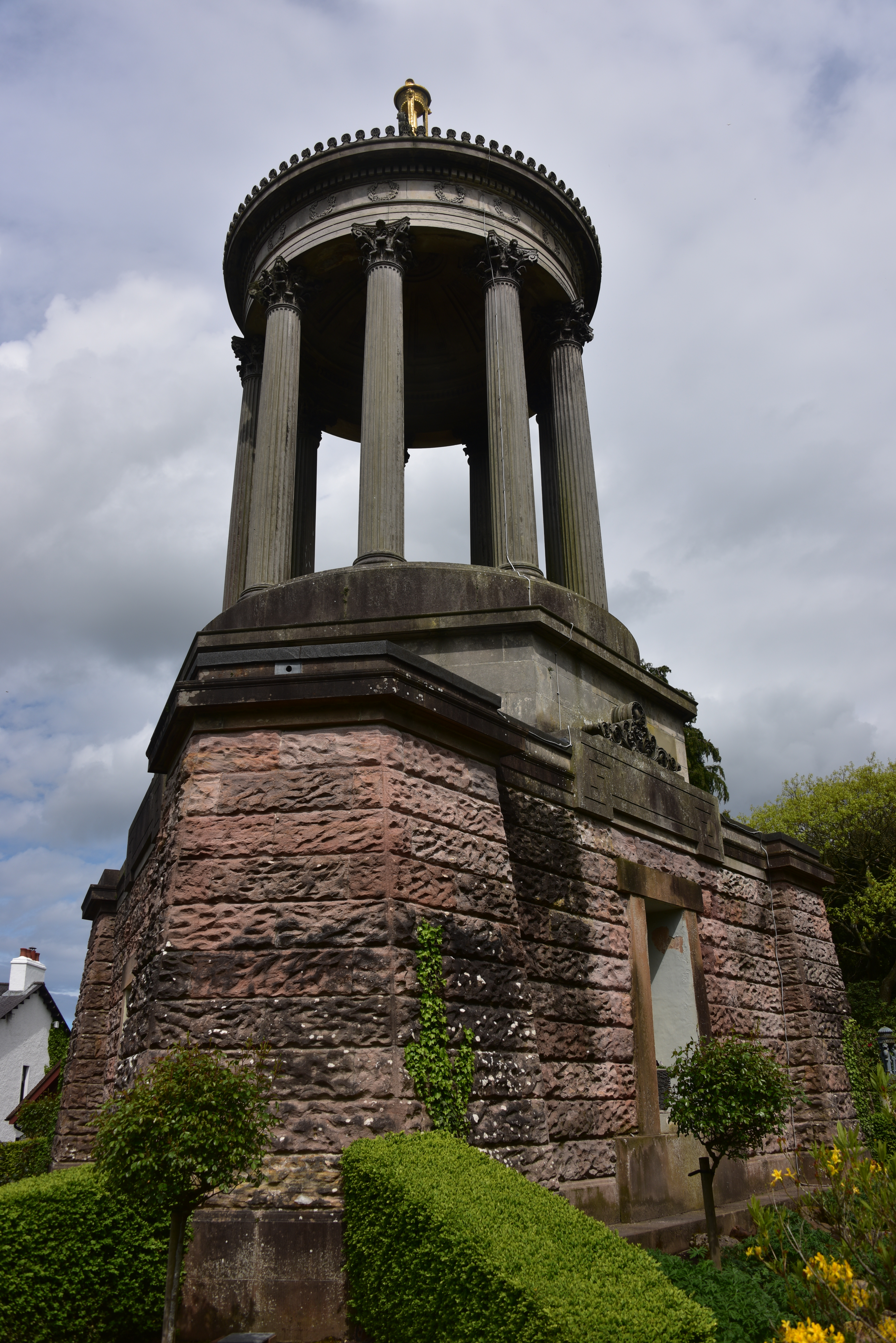
Burns Monument at the poet's birthplace, Alloway

This is a list of over sixty known memorials (statues, busts, fountains, buildings and street names) to the Scottish poet Robert Burns. Of these, the oldest outdoor statue is given to be at Camperdown, Victoria, Australia (1830).

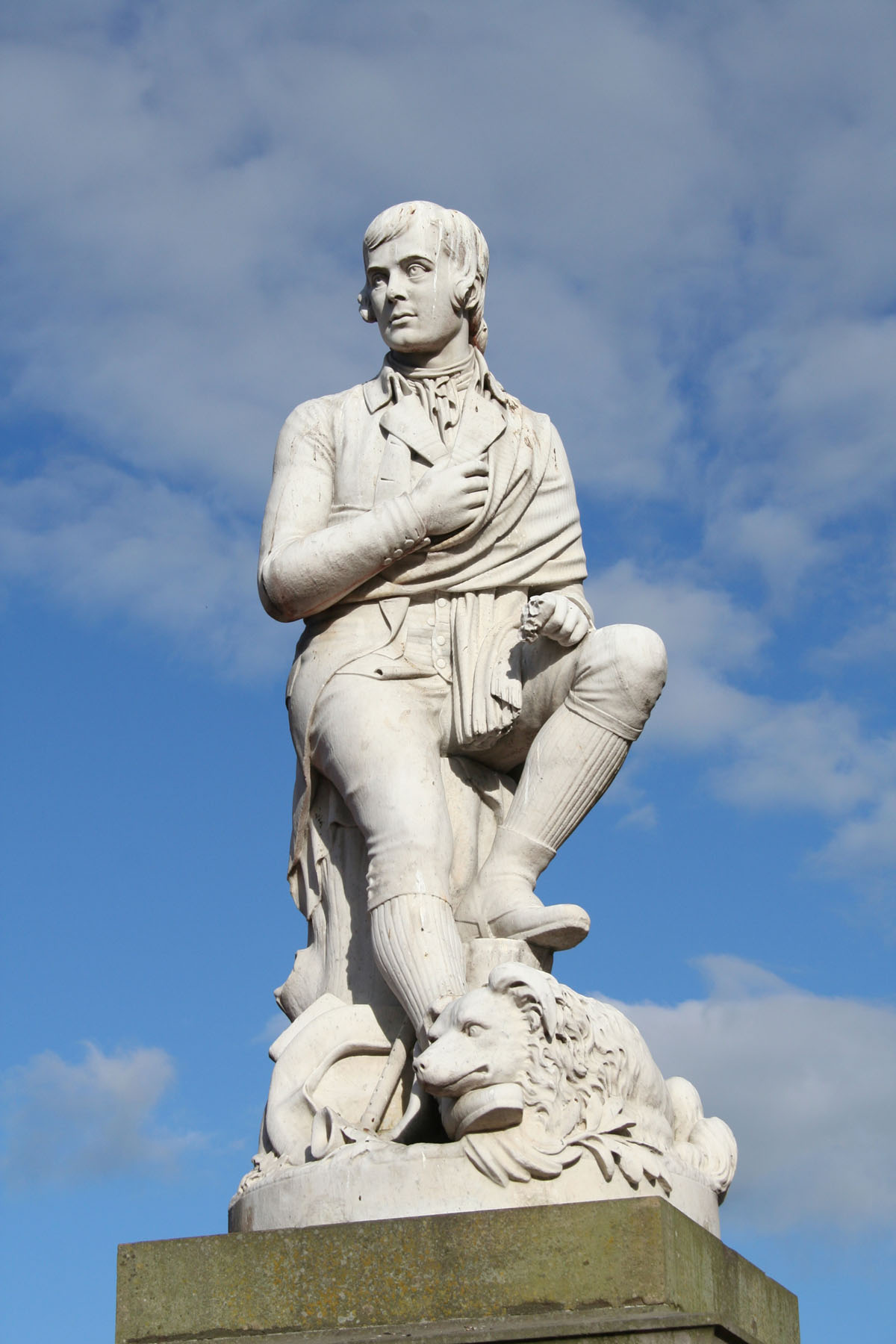
Dumfries town centre statue

== Scotland ==
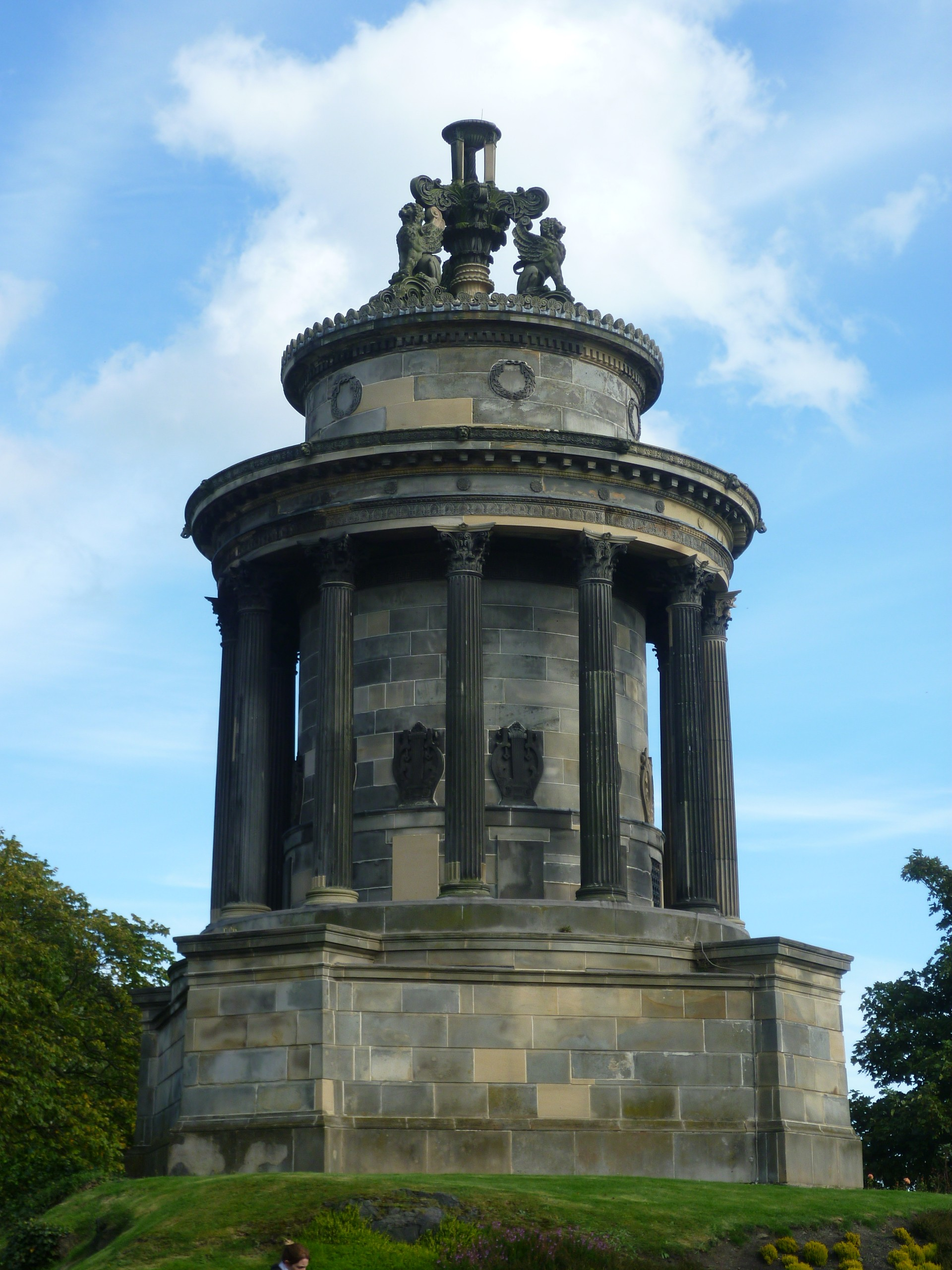
Burns Monument, Edinburgh

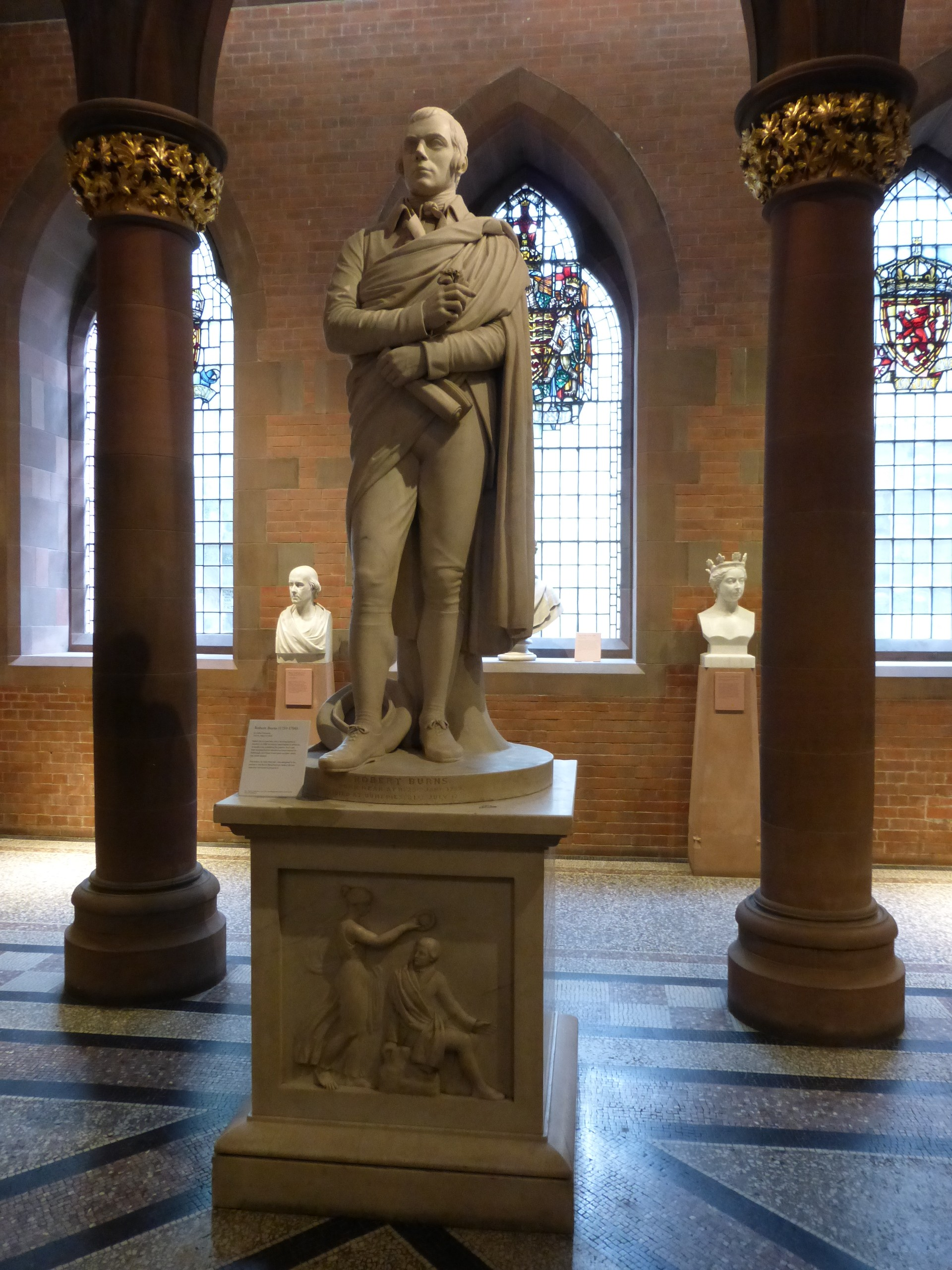
Statue by John Flaxman, Scottish National Portrait Gallery

- Aberdeen – statue near Union Terrace Gardens
- Alloway – monument a short distance from his birthplace. A Greco-Roman bust by Patrick Park stands within the monument, presented in 1847.
- Arbroath – statue by Dundee sculptor Scott Sutherland in the grounds of Arbroath Library. Sutherland may be better known for his work of the Commando Memorial.
- Ayr – statue in Burns Statue Square. Seated statue of Robert Burns and his dog Luath. To mark the opening of the central shopping centre in 2006. Artist David Annand was selected to create a sculpture out of steel and bronze, based on Burns' poem 'The Twa Dogs.'
- Bathgate – statue of Rabbie Burns with Highland Mary in grounds of Partnership Centre.
- Dalkeith – cast iron drinking fountain originally erected in the High Street in 1899 to commemorate the centenary of the death of Robert Burns in 1896. Removed from the High Street in 1968, the restored monument was relocated back to the High Street in a new location in 2017.
- Dumfries – at the end of the town centre, the statue in white marble of Burns leaning on a tree stump, a dog lying across his foot, is opposite Greyfriars Church. The front panel is inscribed: "Erected by the inhabitants of Dumfries (with the aid of many friends) as a loving tribute to their fellow townsman, the national poet of Scotland. 6th April 1882."
- Dumfries – mausoleum at burial site in St Michael's Churchyard
- Dumfries – Burns House museum
- Dumfries – Burns Street, where Burns House is situated
- Dundee – statue in Meadowside
- Edinburgh – monument on Regent Road, Calton Hill. The marble statue inside by John Flaxman was moved to the Scottish National Portrait Gallery in Edinburgh in 1889.
- Edinburgh – inscription in Makars' Court, outside The Writers' Museum in Edinburgh's Old Town
- Eglinton Country Park – bronze statue in the Visitor Centre presented by R. Clement Wilson.
- Glasgow – statue in George Square, 1877 by George Edwin Ewing, reliefs by J. A. Ewing, cast by Cox and Son
- Irvine – statue by James Pittendrigh Macgillivray on Irvine Moor. Gifted by John Spiers in 1896.
- Kilmarnock – statue of Sicilian marble by William Grant Stevenson. Stood in Kay Park from 1879 until moved to the Burns Monument Centre following a fire started by vandals. See Burns Monument.
- Kilmarnock – statues of Robert Burns and John Wilson, his printer, at Kilmarnock Cross by Alexander Stoddart.
- Leith – statue on Bernard Street
- Mauchline – Burns National Memorial
- Maybole - Burns bust by David Cornell placed in the town hall in 2010.
- Montrose – stone statue by William Birnie Rhind (1853–1933) was unveiled in 1912
- New Cumnock – statue by Castle Road
- Paisley – statue in the Fountain Gardens, by F. W. Pomeroy
- Portpatrick – statue produced by local sculptor James Watt, and erected in Portpatrick in 1923 by the village's Burns Club. Damaged by storms in the 1980s, it was refurbished and repainted by the Stranraer Burns Club and Portpatrick Bowls Club in 2016. The statue now overlooks the bowling greens.
- Prestonpans – Burns Bicentennial Memorial, erected by the local Burns Club
- Stirling – statue outside Albert Halls
- Stirling – a white marble bust of Burns, looking to his right, is within the Wallace Monument
- Stonehaven - a stone bust of Burns, and an information board entitled "The Fatherland of Robert Burns", is within the Burns Memorial Garden at the corner of David Street and Belmont Brae.

== Australia ==
- Adelaide, South Australia – A standing Burns in marble holds a book with the right arm, and the left poised away from the body. The statue is outside the State Library of South Australia. Erected May 1894, by the South Australian Caledonian Society.
- Ballarat, Victoria – statue of a standing Burns with a dog to his left, in Sturt Street (corner of Lydiard Street) Ballarat. On the grey granite plinth the front panel details his dates and places of birth and death, followed by stanzas from There was a man from Kyle. The other three sides have stanzas from various poems about humanity and learning.
- Bendigo, Victoria – bust in the Bendigo Art Gallery
- Brisbane, Queensland – statue at Centenary Place. Erected about 1929 by the Brisbane Caledonian Society and Burns Club. In the park is another statue of a similar name, that of Thomas Joseph Byrnes, Premier of Queensland.
- Camperdown, Victoria – statue, possibly the oldest existing outside Burns statue, carved in 1830, and the first one in the Southern Hemisphere. Based on a 1786 live painting of Burns, it was displayed at a Crystal Palace exhibition before coming to Australia. Due to vandalism in 2009, the plinth remains in the botanic park but the statue has been moved to the shire council chambers. It is presently being considered for restoration.
- Canberra, ACT – statue outside the eponymous Burns Centre, National Circuit, Forrest (1935)
- Melbourne, Victoria – statue in Treasury Gardens, with bronze friezes decorating the plinth. The granite plinth is beneath a standing Burns in bronze, with right foot slightly forward, and the right arm almost crossed above the left across the chest. "Erected under the auspices of the Caledonian Society Melbourne 1904", the front brass states the last name of the poet. The plinth followed clockwise displays almost-identical reliefs of scenes from his poems, To a mountain daisy (1786), Tam O'Shanter (1790), and The cotter's Friday night (1785). The sculptor George Anderson Lawson also had later-erected memorials in Vancouver (1928) and Montreal (1930), Canada.
- Sydney, New South Wales – statue of Burns with plough, outside the Art Gallery of New South Wales
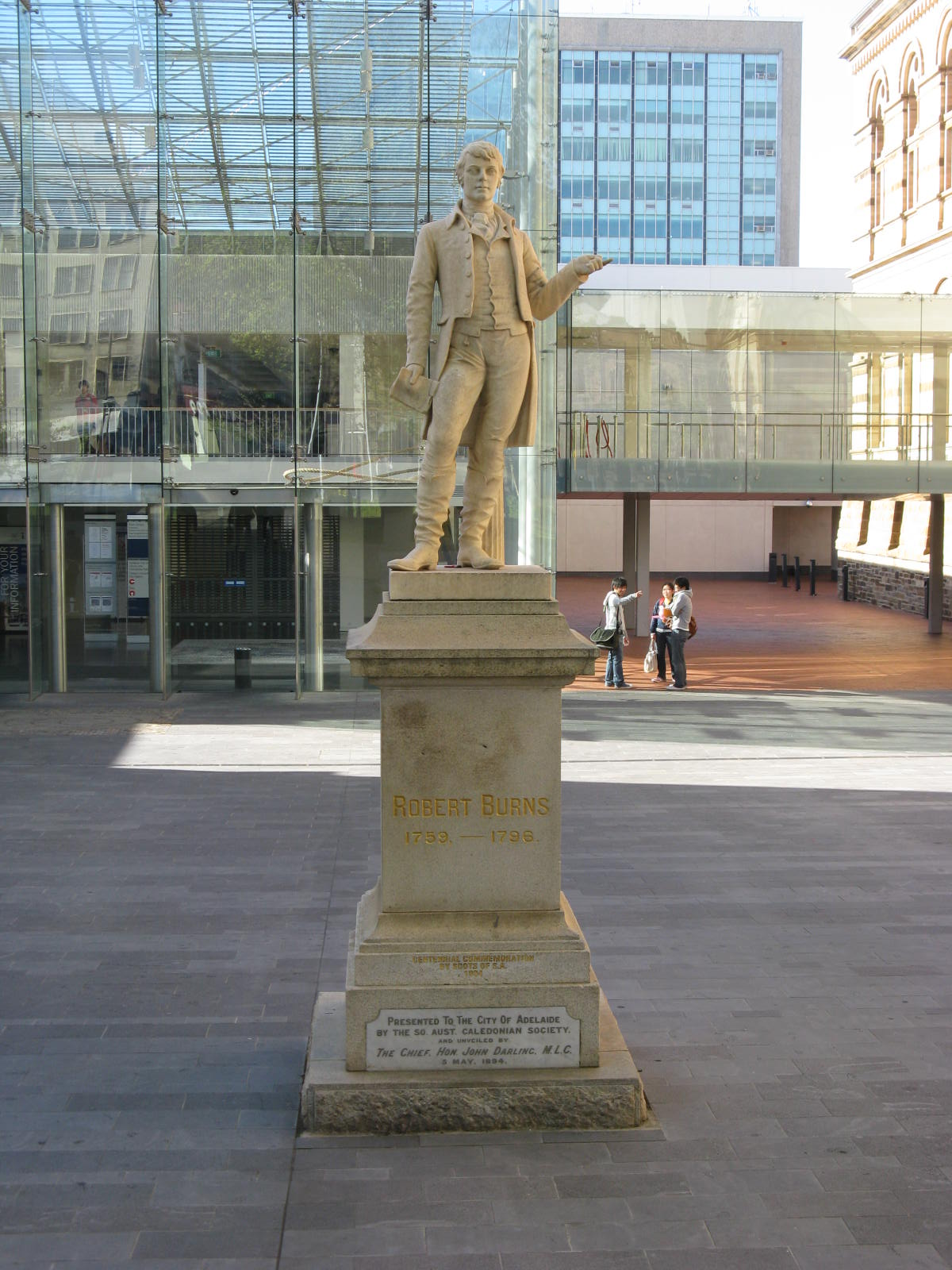
State Library of South Australia, Adelaide

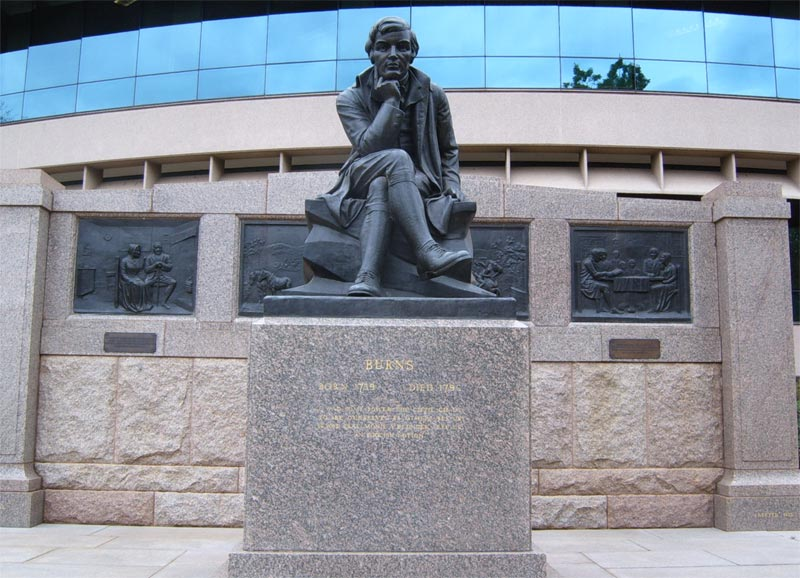
Canberra, Australian Capital Territory (1935)

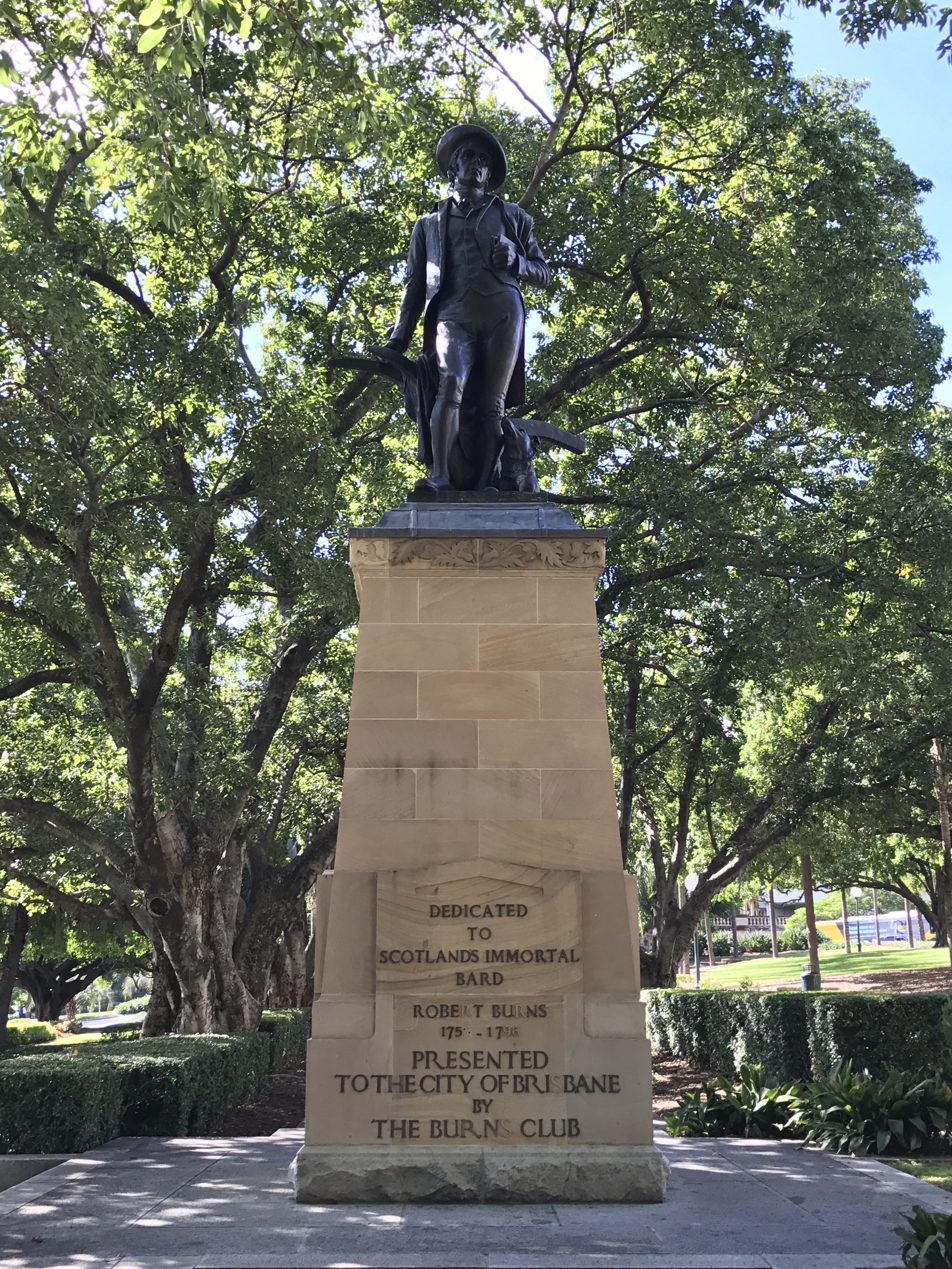
Robert Burns Memorial in Centenary Place, Brisbane

== Canada ==
- Edmonton, Alberta – statue in bronze of Burns kneeling, in the grounds of the Hotel Macdonald, by John Warner
- Fredericton, New Brunswick – statue on the Green, by the banks of the Saint John River, across from the Provincial Legislature. The Fredericton Society of Saint Andrew sponsored the erection in the Kilmarnock style in 1906. Absent from 2008 to 2011, the statue has been remodelled for flood-proofing.
- Halifax, Nova Scotia – statue erected in 1914 by the North British Society. See Victoria Park.
- Montreal, Quebec – statue in Dominion Square, erected 1930. See Robert Burns Memorial (Montreal).
- Toronto, Ontario – the erect Burns in brass is on top of a light granite plinth in Allan Gardens. Erected 21 July 1902, "to the memory of the poet by his admirers". Scenes reflecting The cotter's Friday night (1785), Tam o' Shanter, John Anderson my jo, and possibly To a mountain daisy (1786).
- Vancouver, British Columbia – statue in Stanley Park. See Robert Burns Memorial, Stanley Park.
- Victoria, British Columbia – near the southern car park in Beacon Hill Park – his statue sits, almost kneeling, with his arm around Highland Mary. In the grey granite plinth front face, beneath a rampant lion upon a shield, is inscribed "To the memory of Scotia'an immortal bard. Born 1759. Erected by his admirers 1900." Going clockwise from the front panel, an inscription "The golden hours, on angel wings flew o'er me and my dearie;" above a lion's head drinking basin, a shield with the saltire, and a coloured framed picture of the bard (perhaps added after erection) with the words above, "For dear to me as light and life was my sweet Highland Mary."
- Windsor, Ontario – large bronze bust presented to the City of Windsor by The Border Cities Burns Club in June 1952. Located on the east side of Jackson Park, beside the parking lot.
- Winnipeg, Manitoba – statue in the grounds of the Provincial Legislature, on Kennedy Street. It was erected in 1936 by the Winnipeg Burns Club.
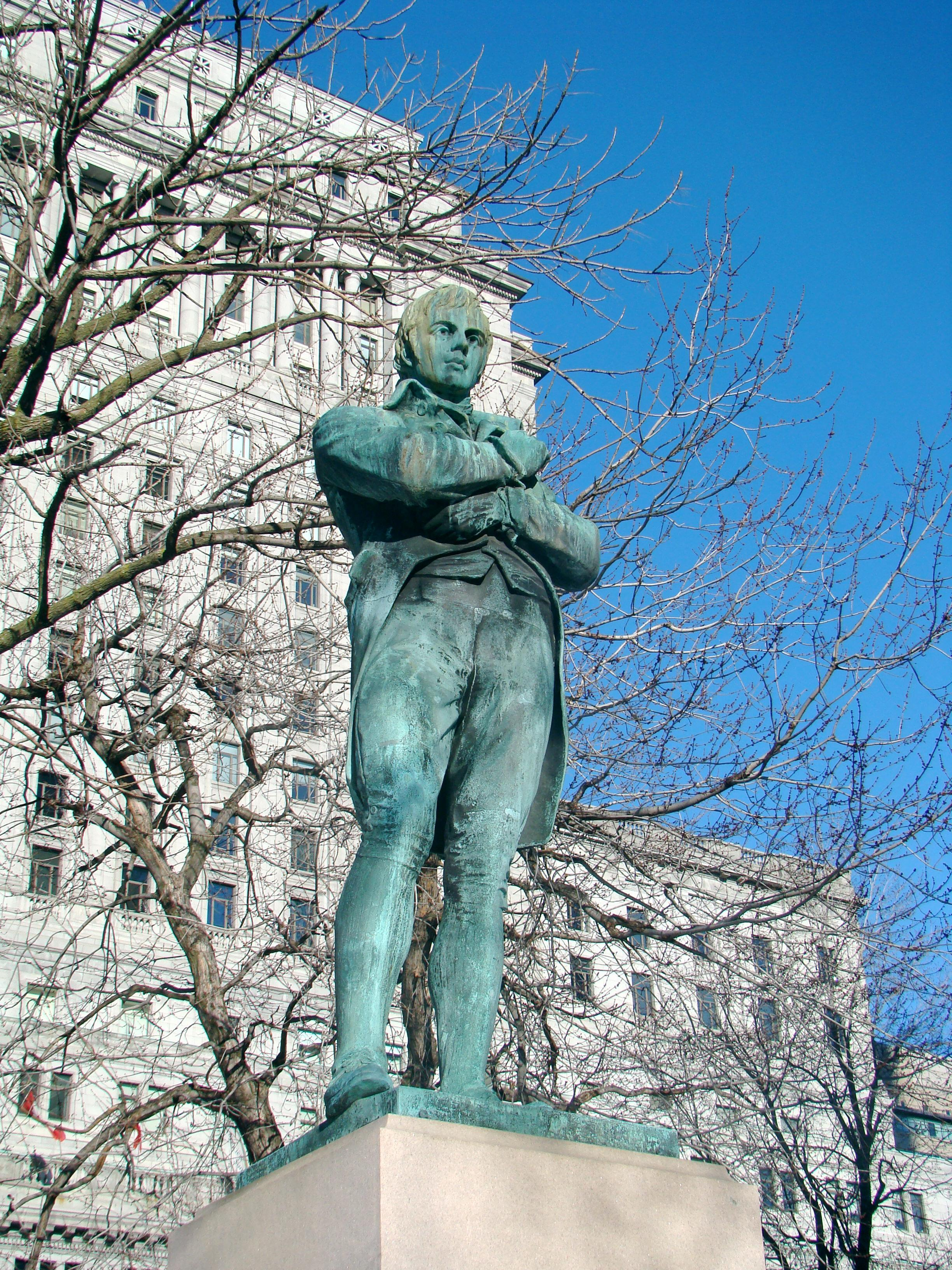
Montreal Statue by George Anderson Lawson dedicated to Burns in tribute to its founding Scottish community.

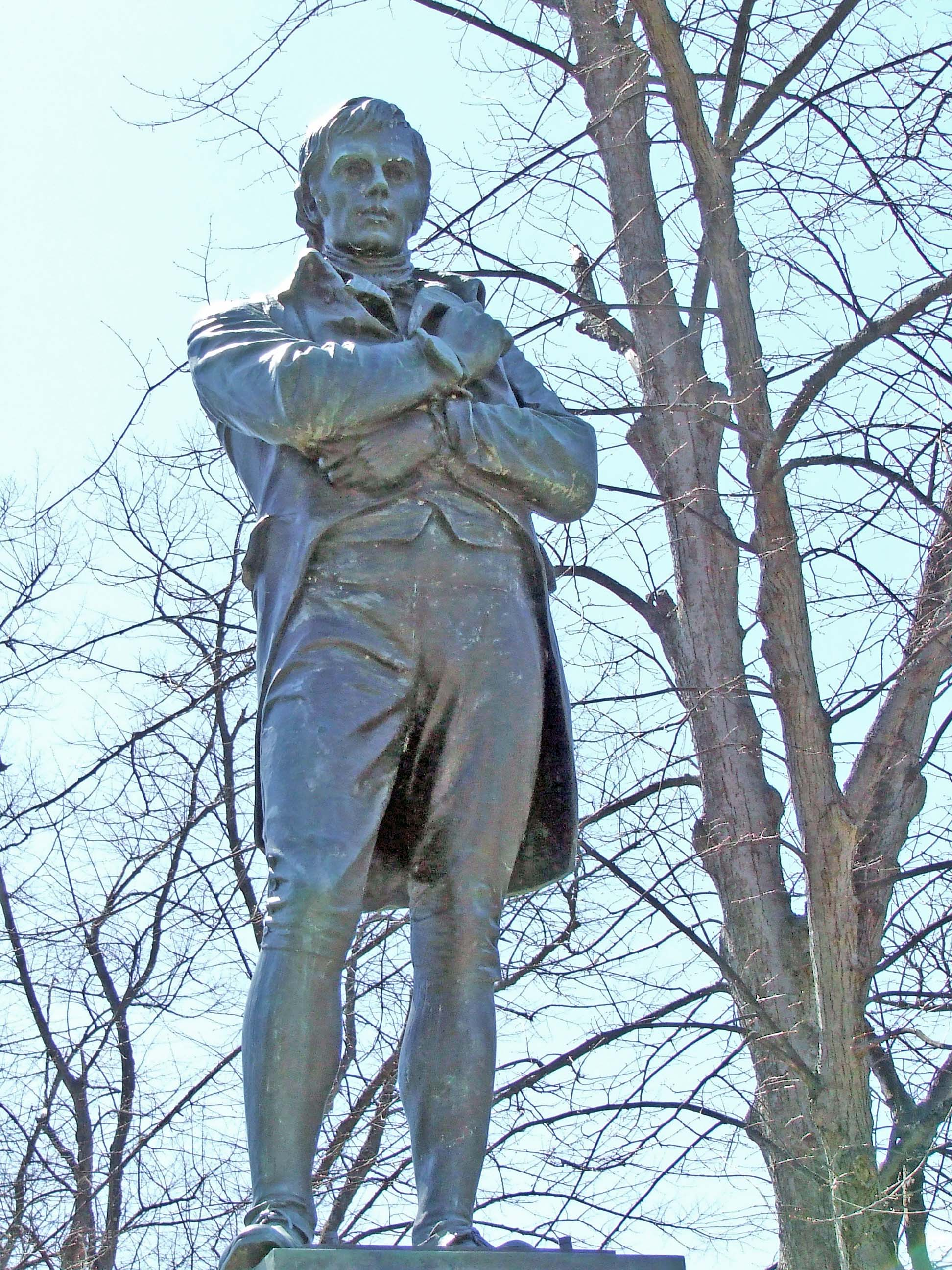
Burns statue in Victoria Park (Halifax), Halifax, Nova Scotia by George Anderson Lawson

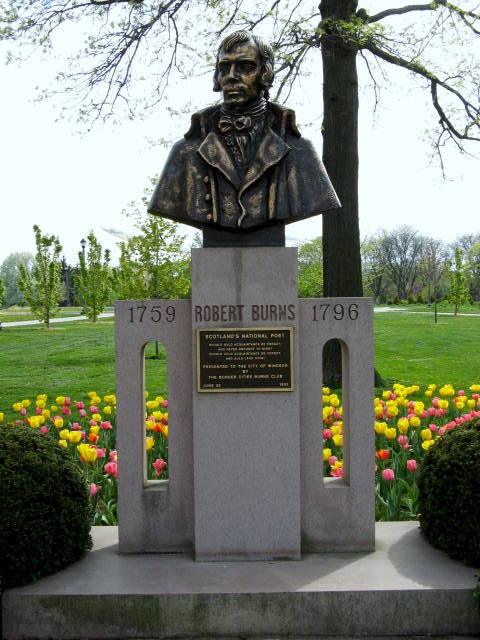
Burns statue in Jackson Park, Windsor, Ontario

== England ==
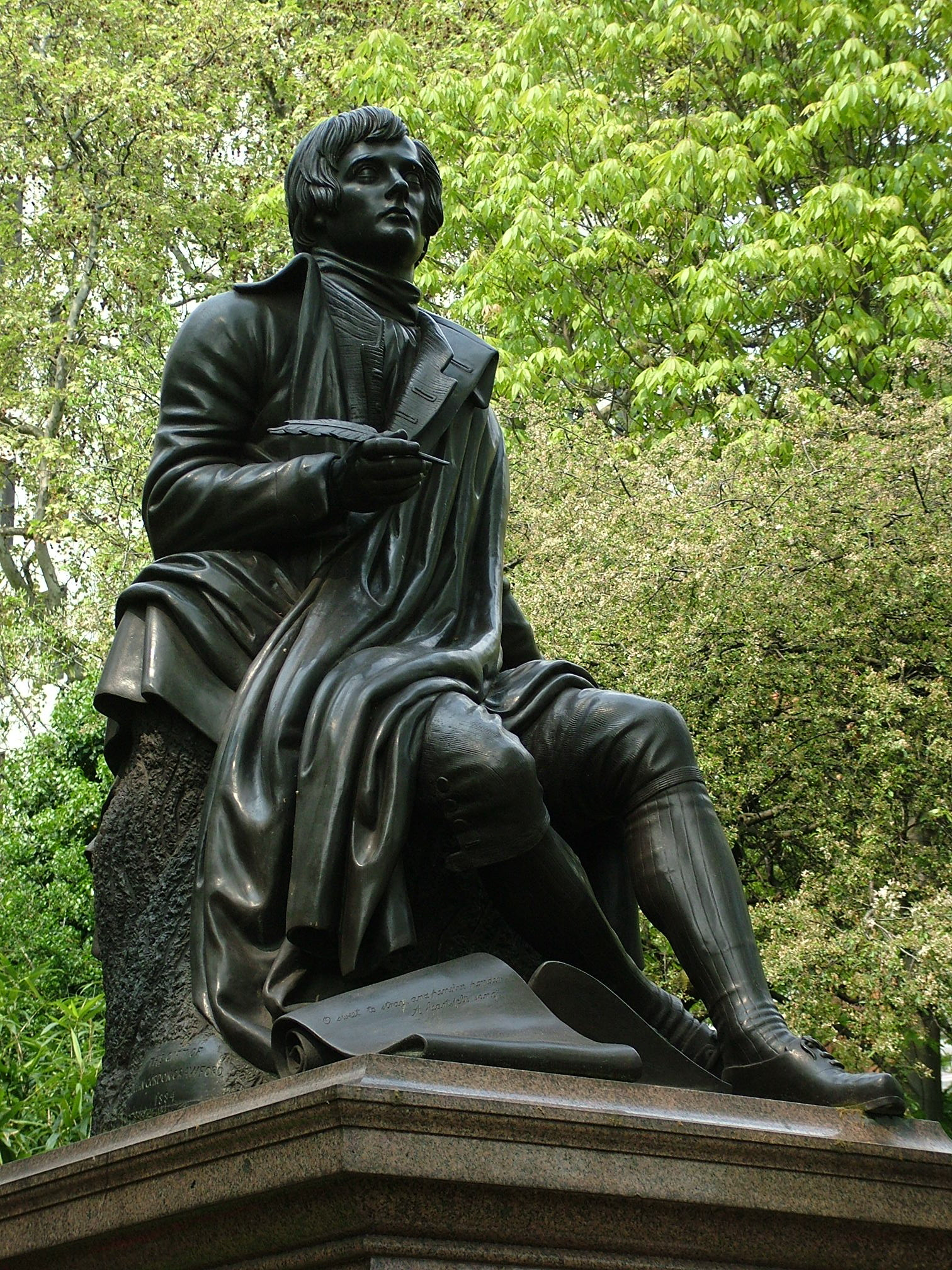
Victoria Embankment Gardens, London

- Cheltenham – street called Robert Burns Avenue
- London – statue in the Victoria Embankment Gardens (1884). See Robert Burns (Steell).
- London – memorial bust in Poets' Corner, Westminster Abbey (1885)
- London – Burns Close, a street in Welling, one of a group of streets named after authors
- Newcastle upon Tyne – statue in Walker Park. The statue was erected to commemorate the visit by Burns to Newcastle in 1787

== New Zealand ==
- Auckland, North Island – a brass statue in The Domain erected in 1921, with Burns leaning on a plough, on top of a stone plinth. The front panel of the plinth is inscribed: "To the immortal memory of Robert Burns 1759–1796. The peasant bard of Scotland. The strong advocate of universal freedom and the brotherhood of man."
- Dunedin, South Island – statue in The Octagon. One of the city's founding fathers was the poet's nephew Thomas Burns. See Robert Burns (Steell).
- Hokitika, South Island – statue in Cass Square
- Timaru, South Island – statue in Timaru Botanic Gardens
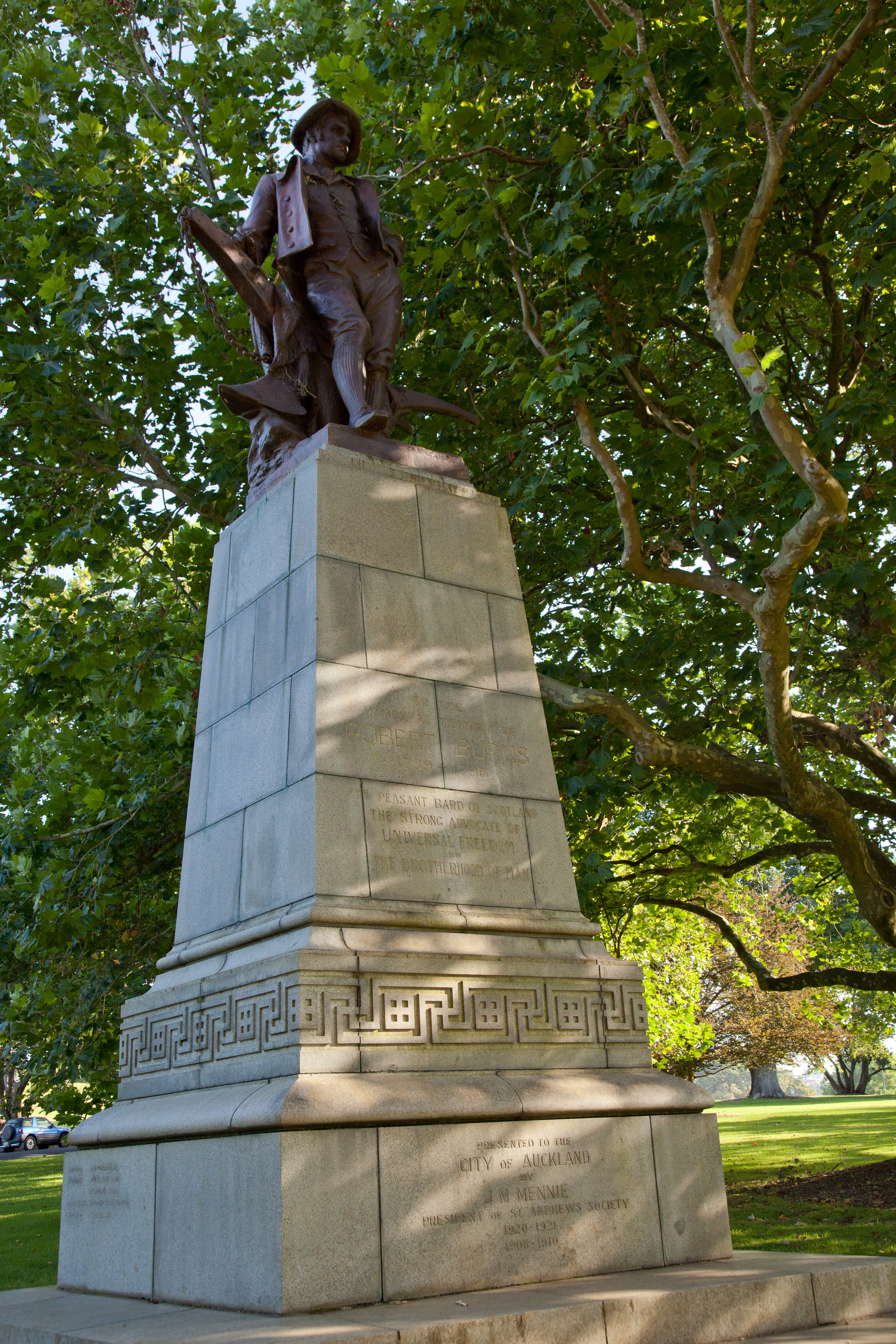
Auckland Domain

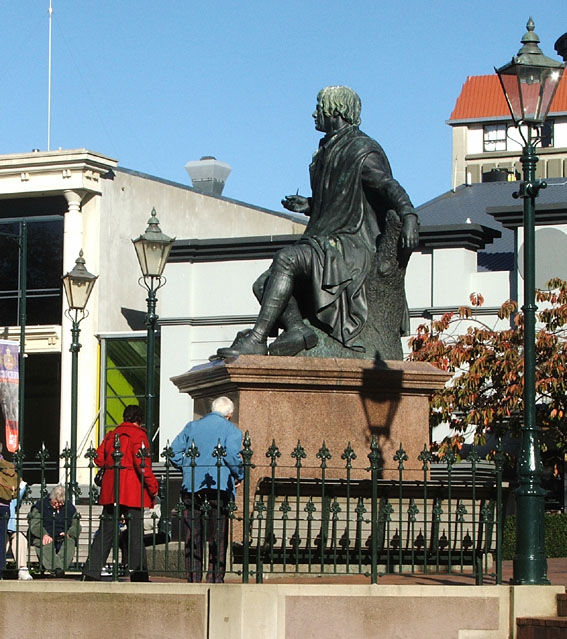
The Octagon, Dunedin

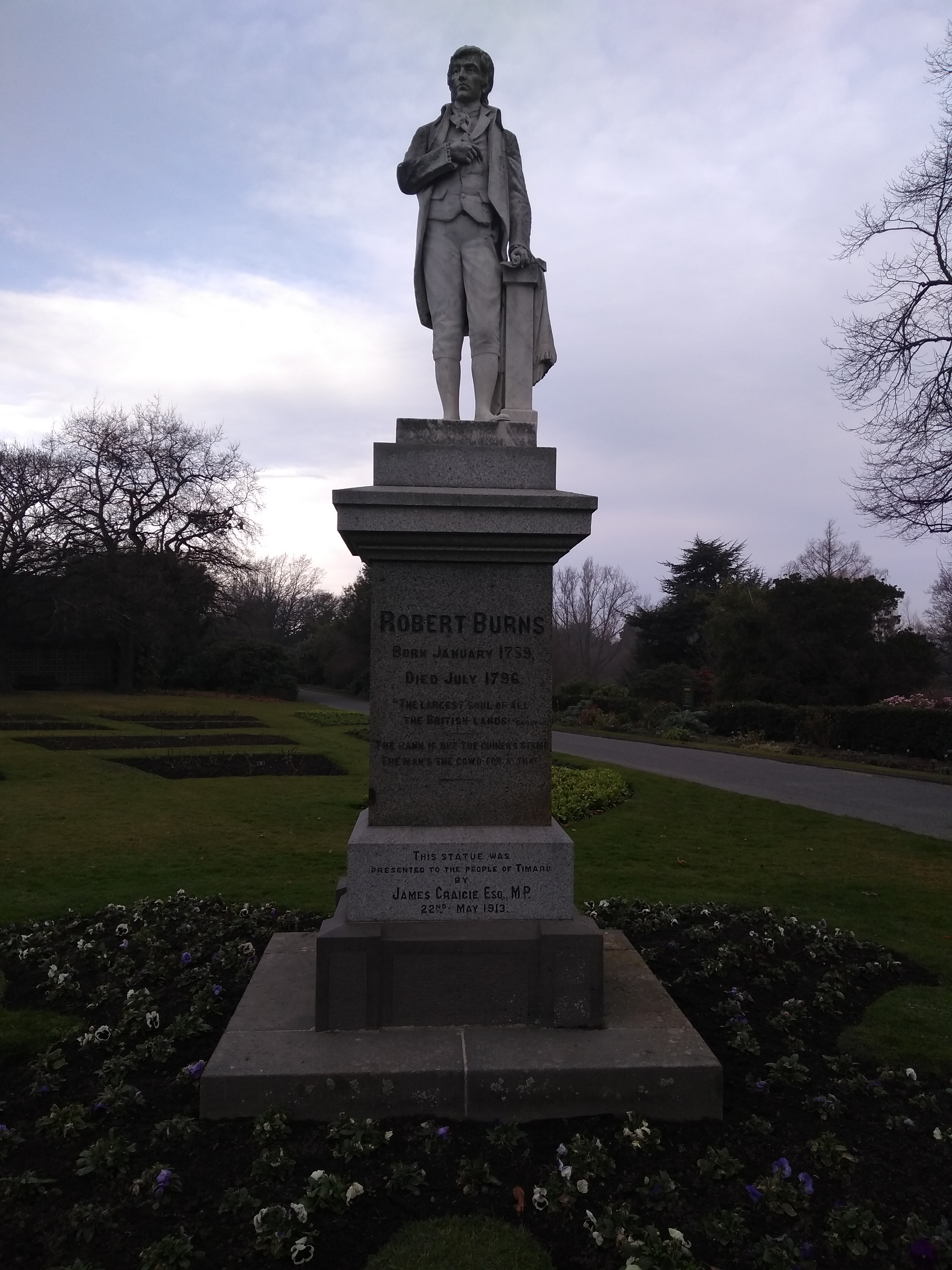
Timaru Botanic Gardens

== United States ==
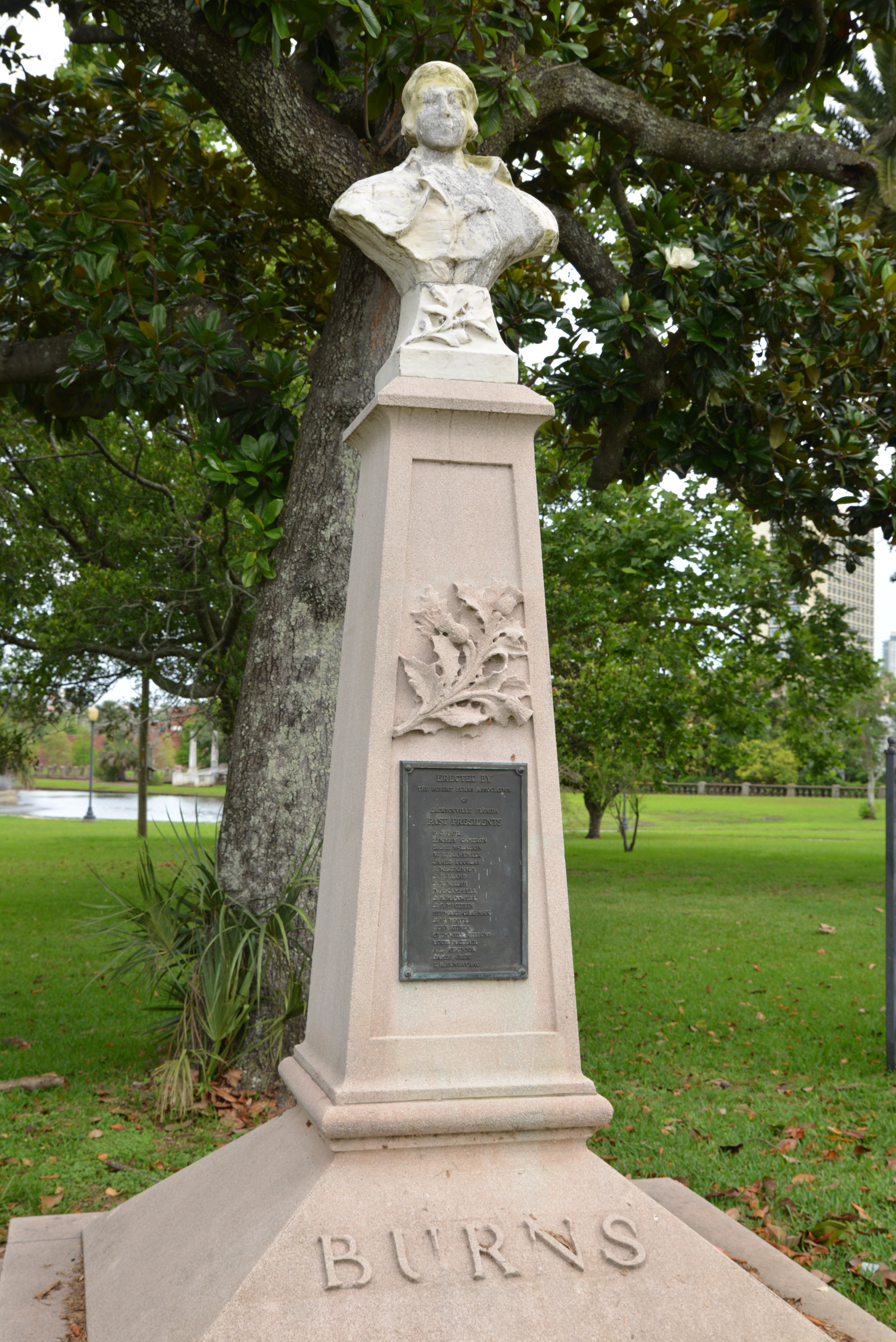
Statue in Springfield Park, by the Robert Burns Association of Jacksonville, Florida

- Albany, New York – statue in Washington Park, unveiled 1888. Sculptured by Albany-born Charles Calverley, the commissioning was part of a will bequest. See Statue of Robert Burns (Albany, New York).
- Atlanta, Georgia – replica of Burns' birthplace cottage belonging to the Burns Club Atlanta, constructed in 1911. See Burns Cottage (Atlanta).
- Barre, Vermont – statue in front of the old Spaulding High School building. See Robert Burns Memorial (Barre).
- Boston, Massachusetts – bronze statue in the Back Bay Fens, by Henry Hudson Kitson and erected in 1920, moved to Winthrop Square in 1975 and relocated back to its original location in 2019.
- Cheyenne, Wyoming – bronze statue erected in Gilchrist Park in 1929, by Scottish sculptor Henry Snell Gamley (1865–1928)
- Chicago, Illinois – statue in Garfield Park, cast in Edinburgh by William Grant Stevenson, it was commissioned in 1906. Burns stands erect, his right hand clasped to his lapel, the left holding a book. Appearing on each face of the plinth is a single line of four different poems. By 2010, the bronze friezes had been removed.
- Denver, Colorado – bronze statue in the City Park, donated by the Scots Caledonian Club of Colorado and erected on July 4, 1904. Across the granite base, "A poet peasant born who more of fame's immortal power unto his country brings than all her kings". The sculptor was William Grant Stevenson (1849–1919), who also did the original Kilmarnock statue.
- Detroit, Michigan – bronze statue by George Anderson Lawson in Ayr, Scotland, in 1891, it was moved to Cass Park near the downtown and erected in 1921 sponsored by the City of Detroit Burns Club and the ladies auxiliary, The Jean Amour Club.
- Houston, Texas – Bust of Robert Burns in the International Sculpture Garden of Hermann Park. Done by Hungarian-American sculptor Ferenc Varga, placed in 2002 years after Varga's death.
- Jacksonville, Florida – a deteriorating limestone bust on a large plinth in Springfield Park, erected in 1930 by the Robert Burns Association of Jacksonville. The four panels were stolen during World War II, allegedly sold for scrap steel. It is located near the corner of Main and Phelps Streets.
- Milwaukee, Wisconsin – bronze statue in Burns Triangle between Prospect and Farwell Avenues on Knapp Street, donated in 1909 by a prosperous grain merchant of Scottish descent named James Anderson Bryden. The sculptor was William Grant Stevenson. The statue is based upon Stevenson's Kilmarnock style. The statue was unveiled on June 26, 1909.
- New York City – the statue in Central Park is a twin to the statue in London, and was dedicated in 1880. See Robert Burns (Steell).
- Pittsburgh, Pennsylvania – statue at Phipps Conservatory & Botanical Gardens
- Quincy, Massachusetts – statue in Robert Burns Park, dedicated in 1925 and moved to the Granite Street in 1971
- San Francisco, California – statue near the Rhododendron Grove, off JFK Drive in Golden Gate Park, erected in 1908. Melvin Earl Cummings' originally commissioned work was sent for casting and was destroyed in the 1906 San Francisco earthquake and fire, and had to be redone.
- St. Louis, Missouri – statue on the Danforth Campus of Washington University in St. Louis, where he was a favourite poet of many of the university trustees. Artist Robert Aitken (1878–1949) completed the eight-foot high bronze, "erected under the auspices of the Burns Club of St. Louis by admirers of Robert Burns and his genius. 1928."
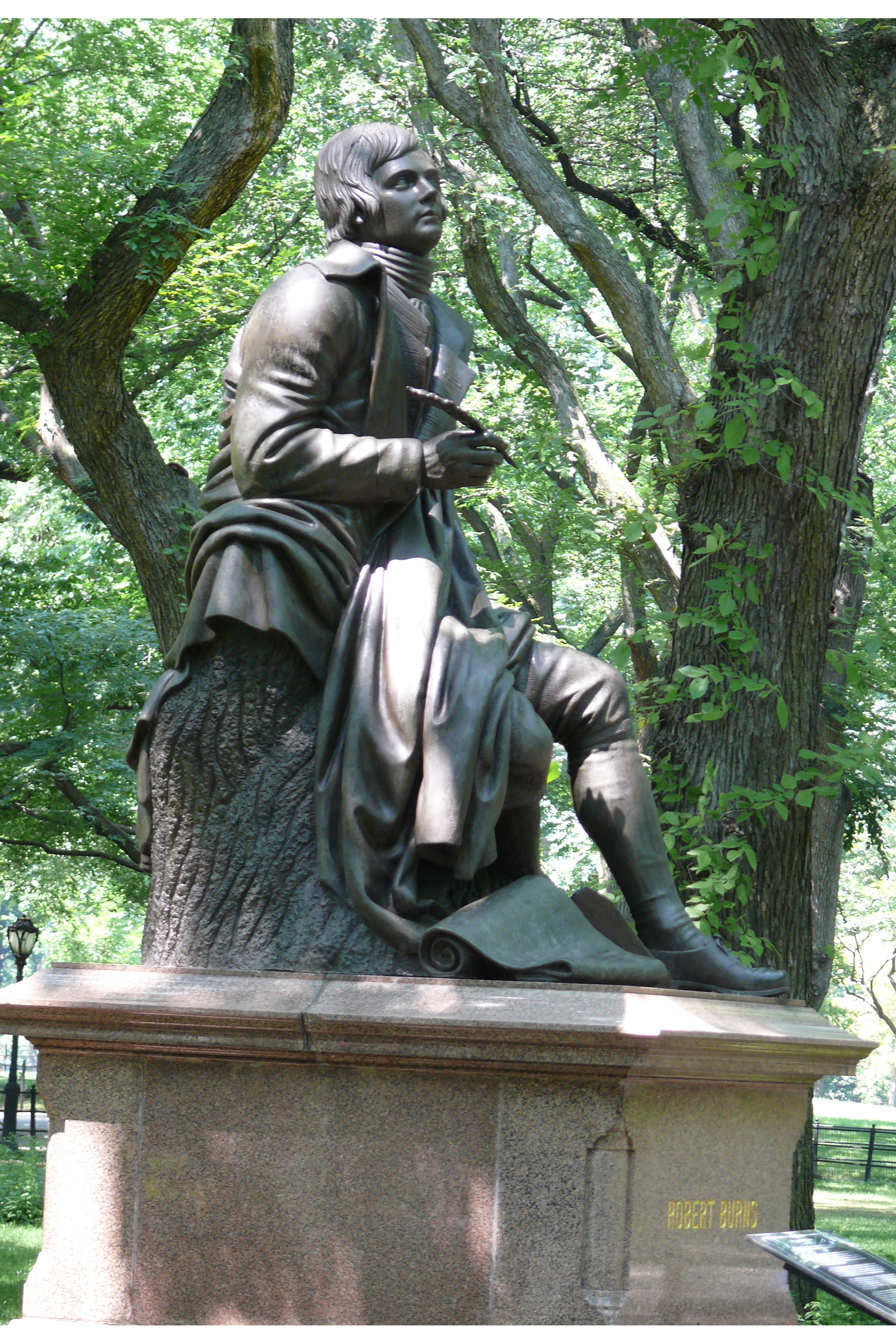
Central Park, New York

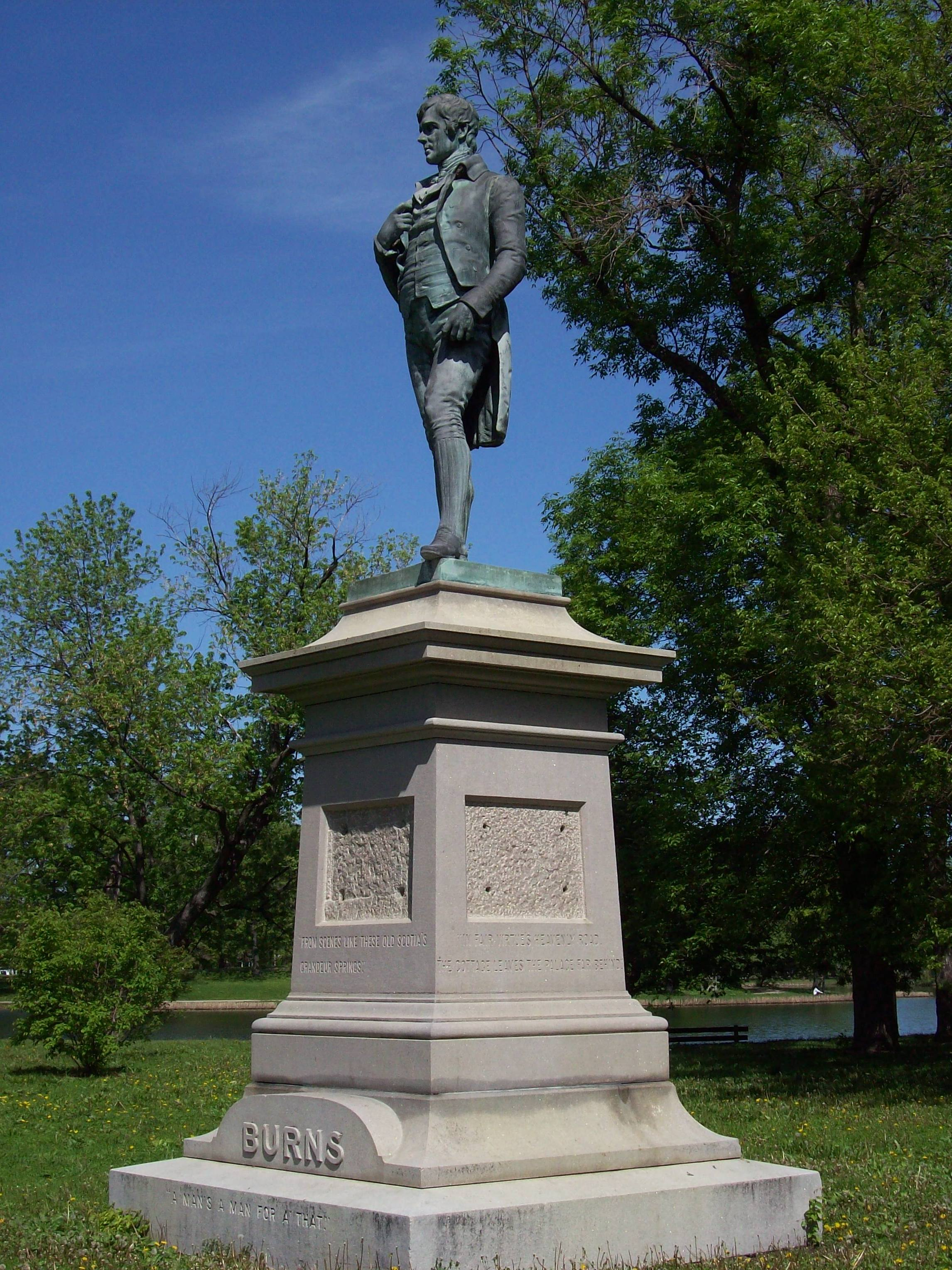
Garfield Park, Chicago

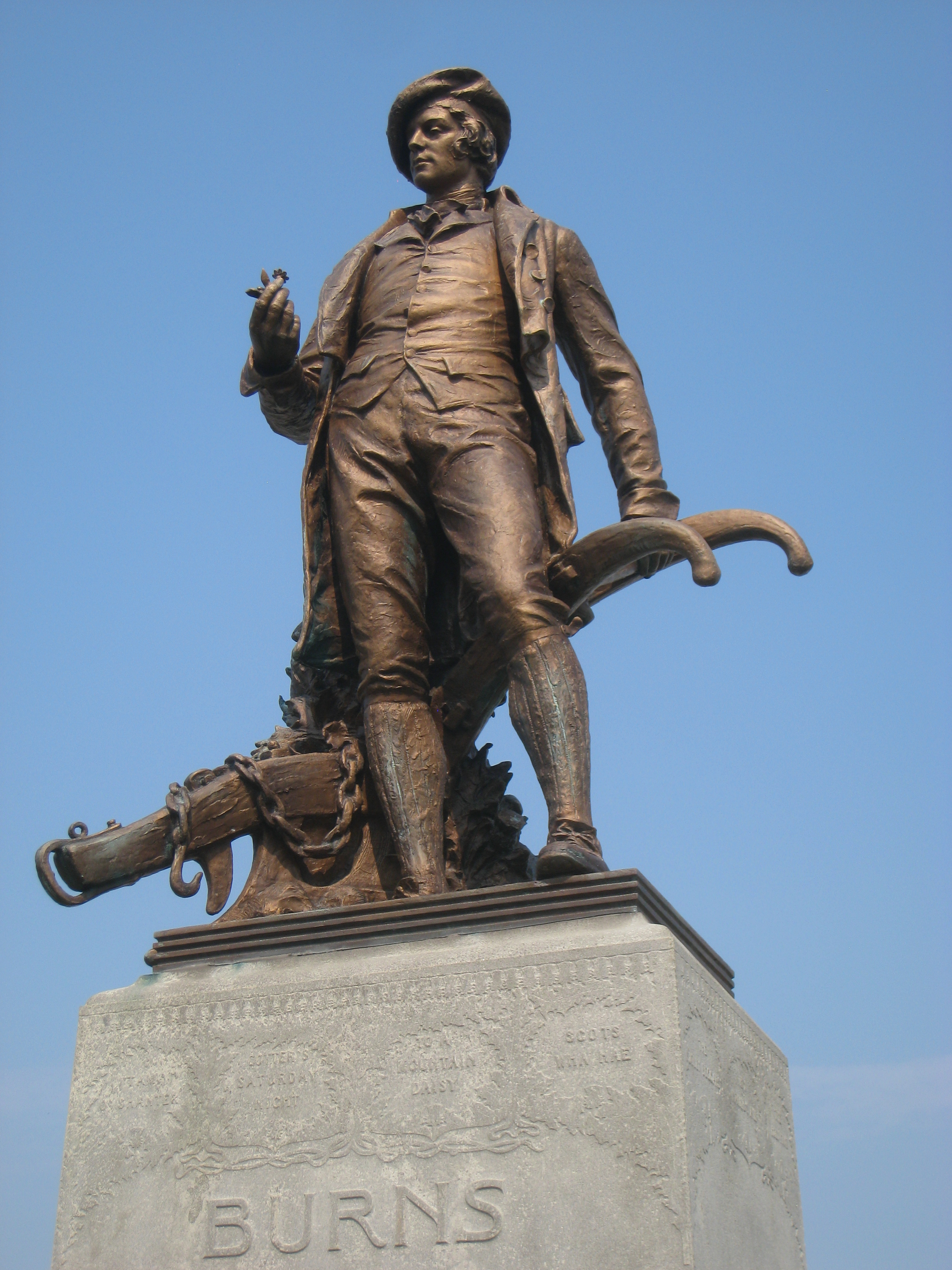
Schenley Park, Pittsburgh

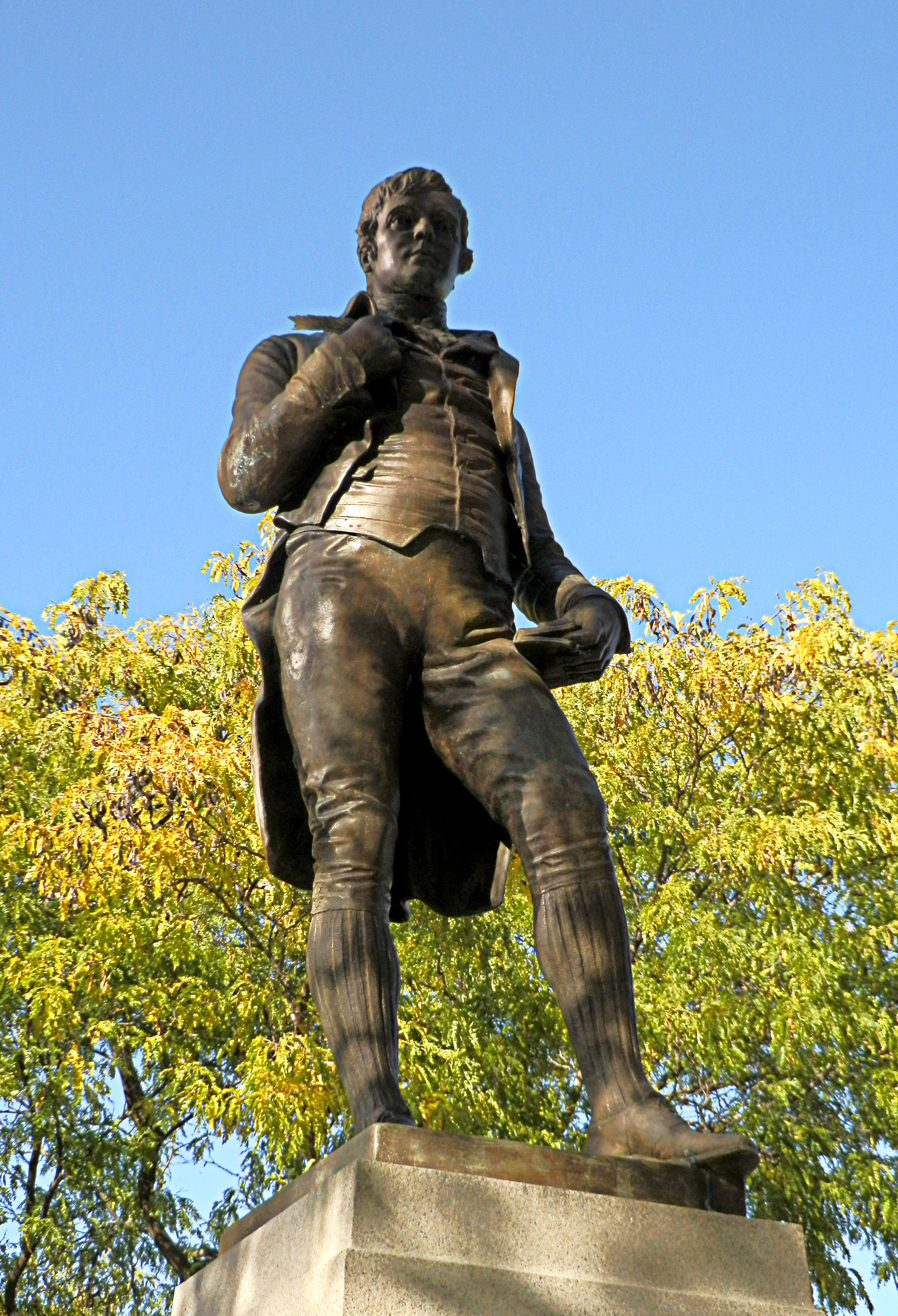
Burns Commons, Milwaukee

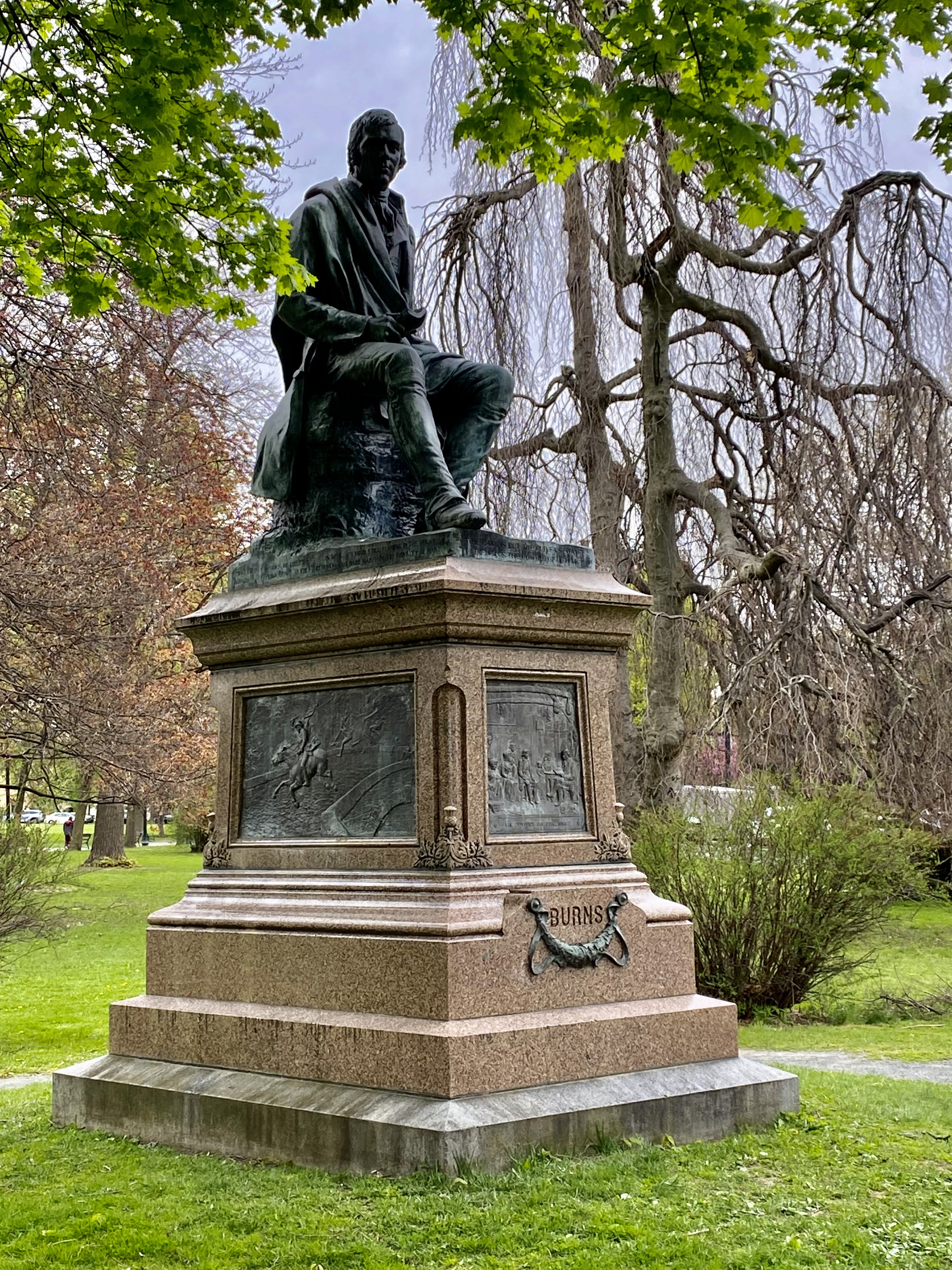
Washington Park, Albany, New York

== Other countries ==
- Belfast, Northern Ireland – a small pedestal and bronze statue stands in the reception area of the Linen Hall Library, being presented to the people of Belfast in 1893
- Tallinn, Estonia – statue (bust) in Scottish Park (Šoti Park), Uus 31 (street), beside the Old Town. Formerly the home of Tallinn's Scottish Club (Šoti Klubi), the park is now associated with the Leib restaurant. Opposite the Burns bust is the later bust of Sir Sean Connery, erected 2011.

== Statue styles ==
Other than text of his poems, a plow may be present to represent his earlier vocation as a farmer. Several statues show Burns' dog, Luath.

A number of statues of Burns, and the friezes around the plinths, are reproductions of an original work.

Sculptor George Anderson Lawson's original work of Burns with right arm folded above the left, in Ayr, Scotland, in 1892 can be seen at:

- Belfast, Northern Ireland (1893), a smaller copy
- Melbourne, Australia (1904)
- Halifax, Nova Scotia, Canada (1914)
- Detroit, Michigan, USA (1921)
- Vancouver, British Columbia, Canada (1928)
- Montreal, Quebec, Canada (1930)
- Winnipeg, Manitoba, Canada (1936)

It has also been reported a second small copy was presented to the Sorbonne University, Paris, France, in 1938. It was then hidden during the German military occupation of France, and so avoided being melted down. Its present whereabouts is unknown.

William Grant Stevenson's Kilmarnock design of Burns holding a book in the left hand whilst the right hand holds the lapel, can be seen at:

- Denver, USA (1904)
- Chicago, USA (1906)
- Milwaukee, USA (1909).

The Frederickton, Canada (1906) statue is also in the Kilmarnock style.

John Steell has four copies of Burns seated on a stump, looking pensively to the upper right:

- New York City, USA (1880)
- Dundee, Scotland (1880)
- London, England (1884)
- Dunedin, New Zealand (1887).

== Gallery ==
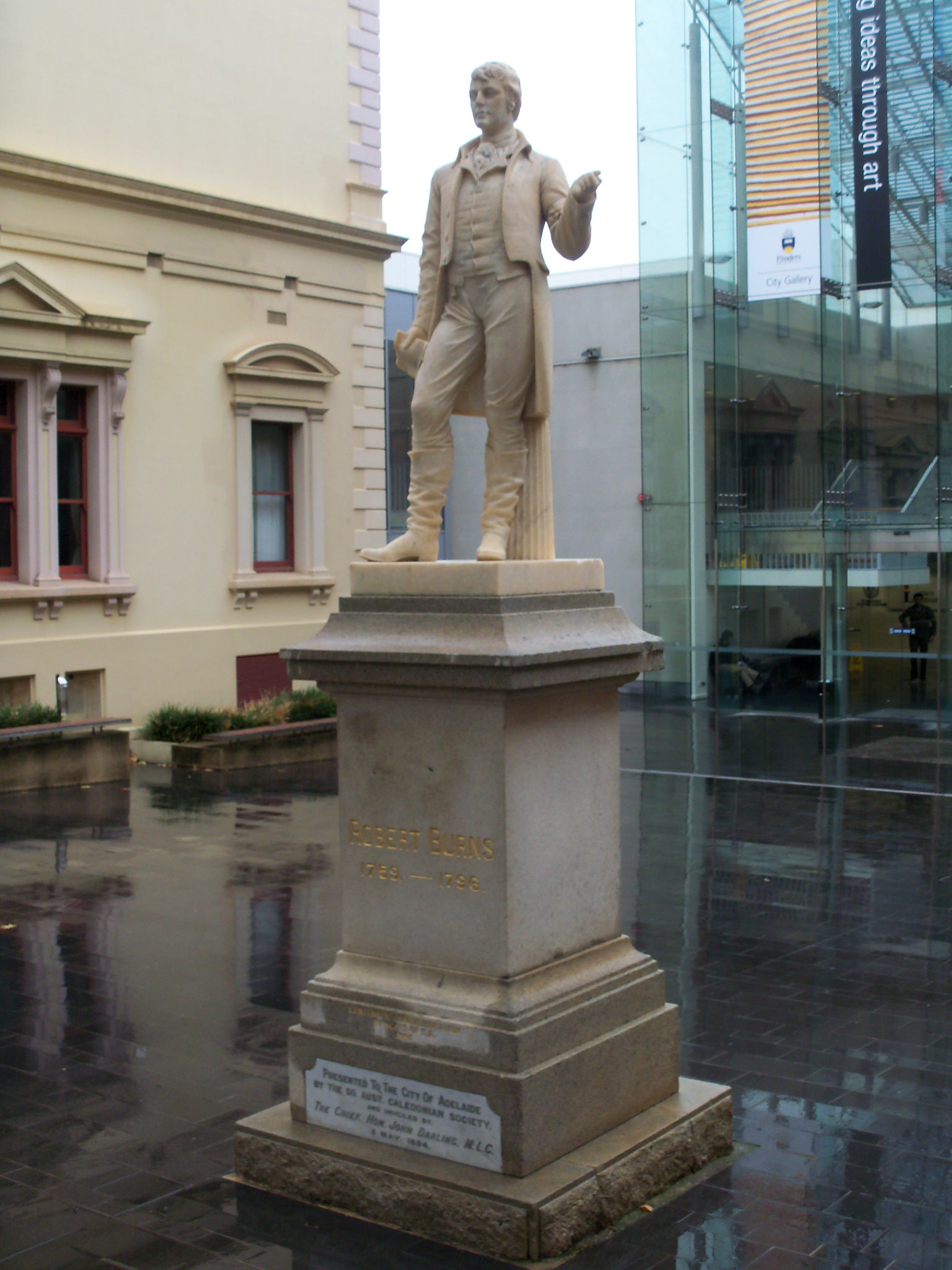
Adelaide, Australia

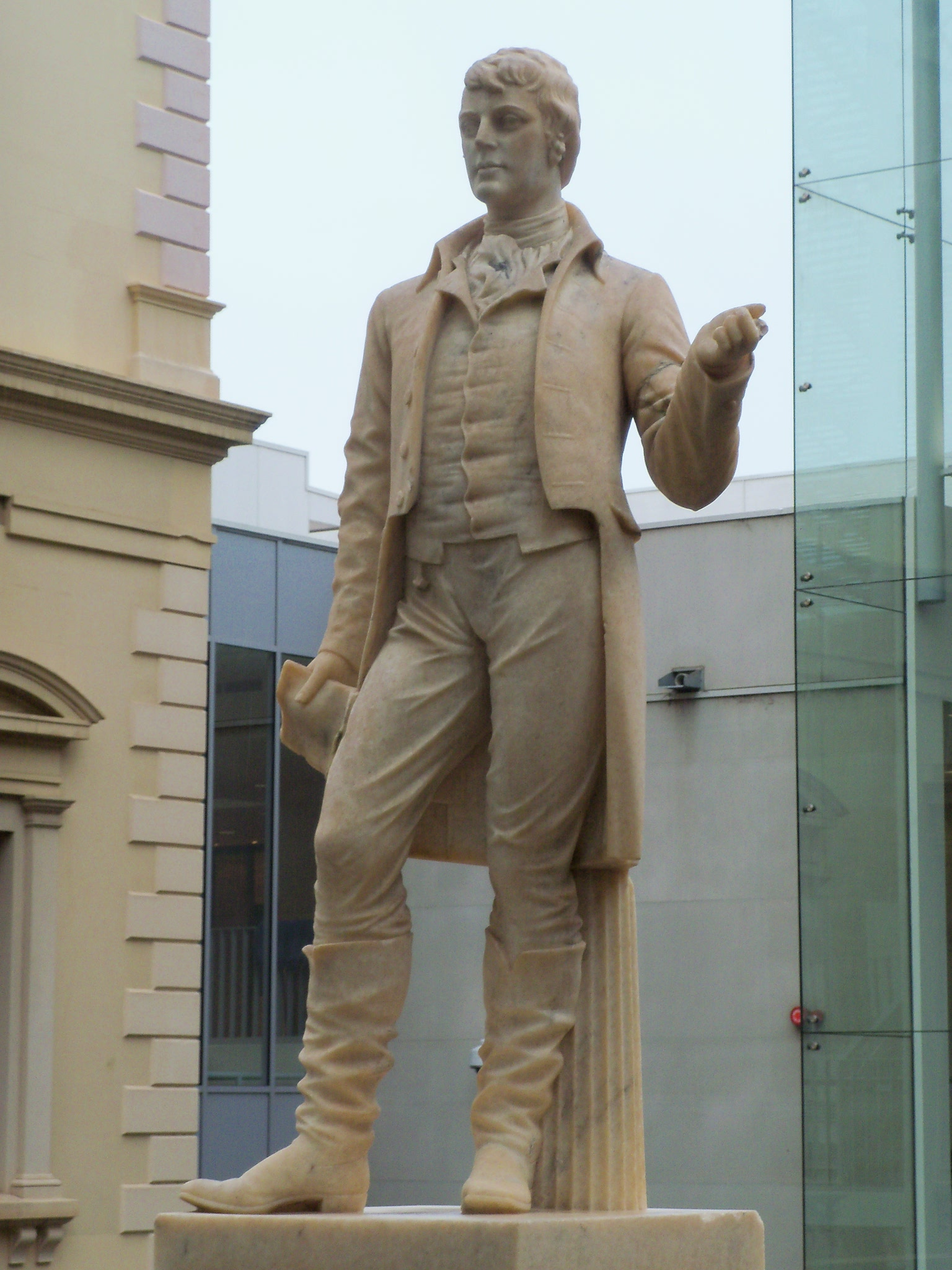
Adelaide, Australia, close-up

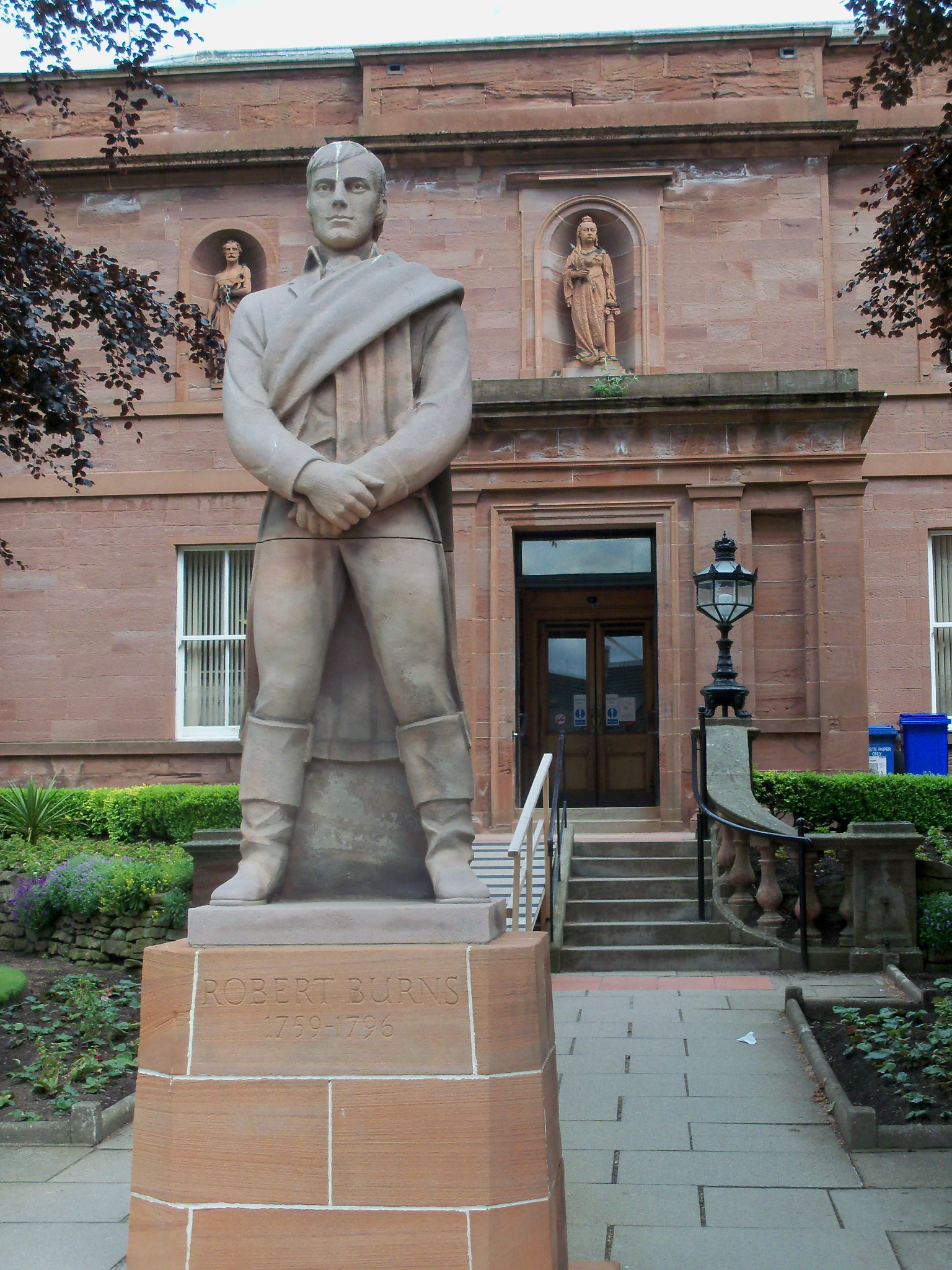
Arbroath, Scotland

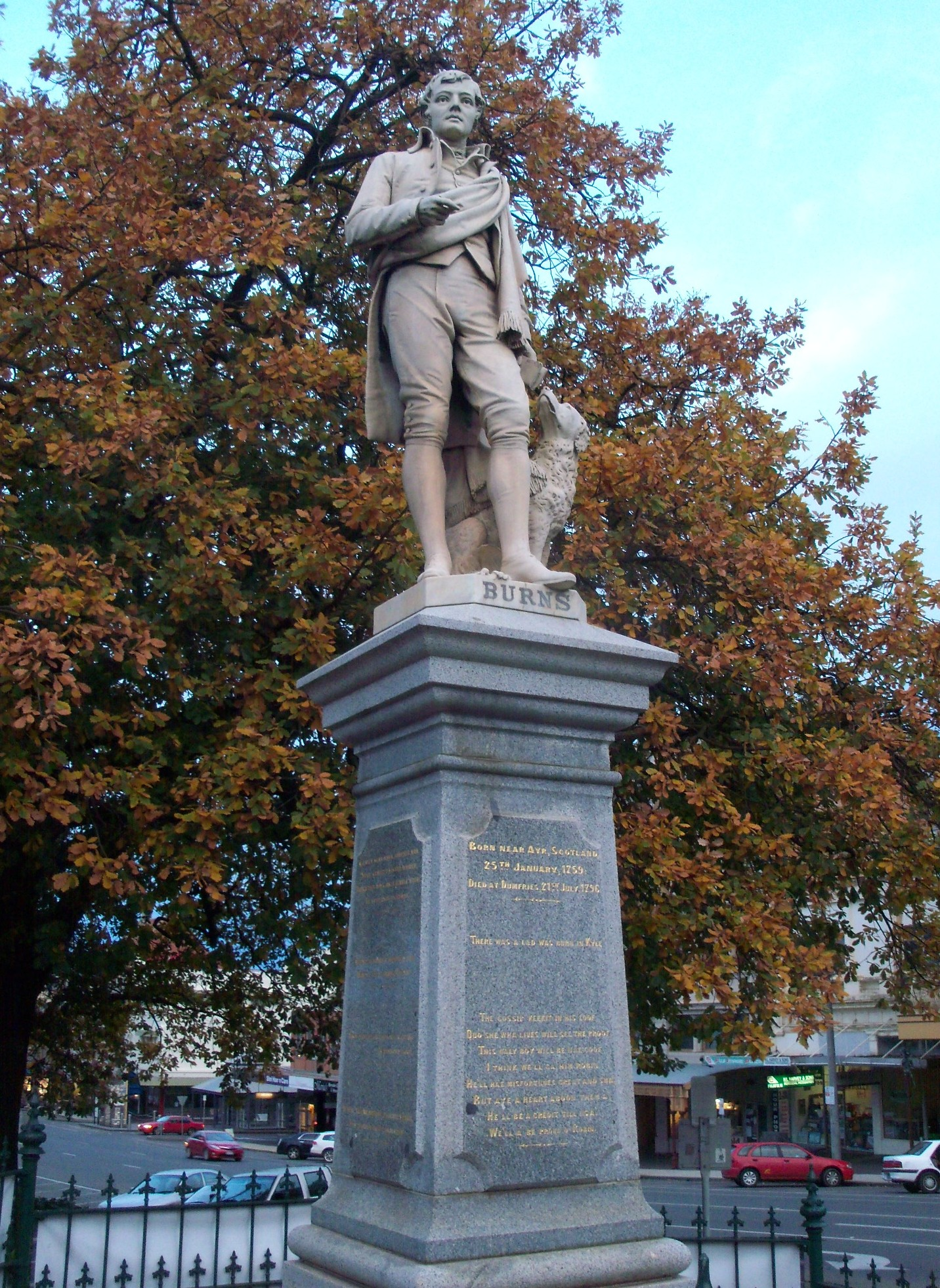
Ballarat, Australia

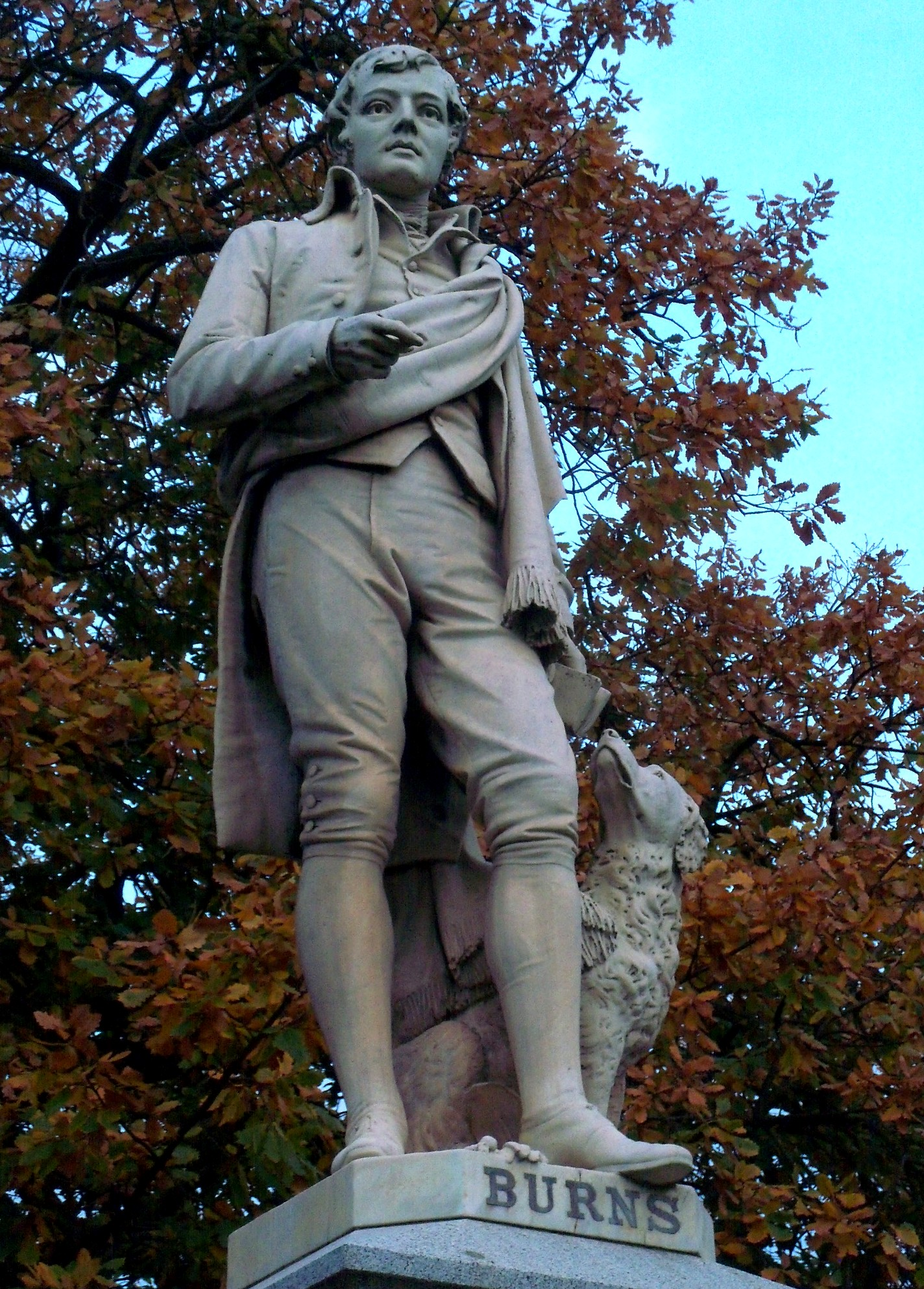
Ballarat, Australia, close-up

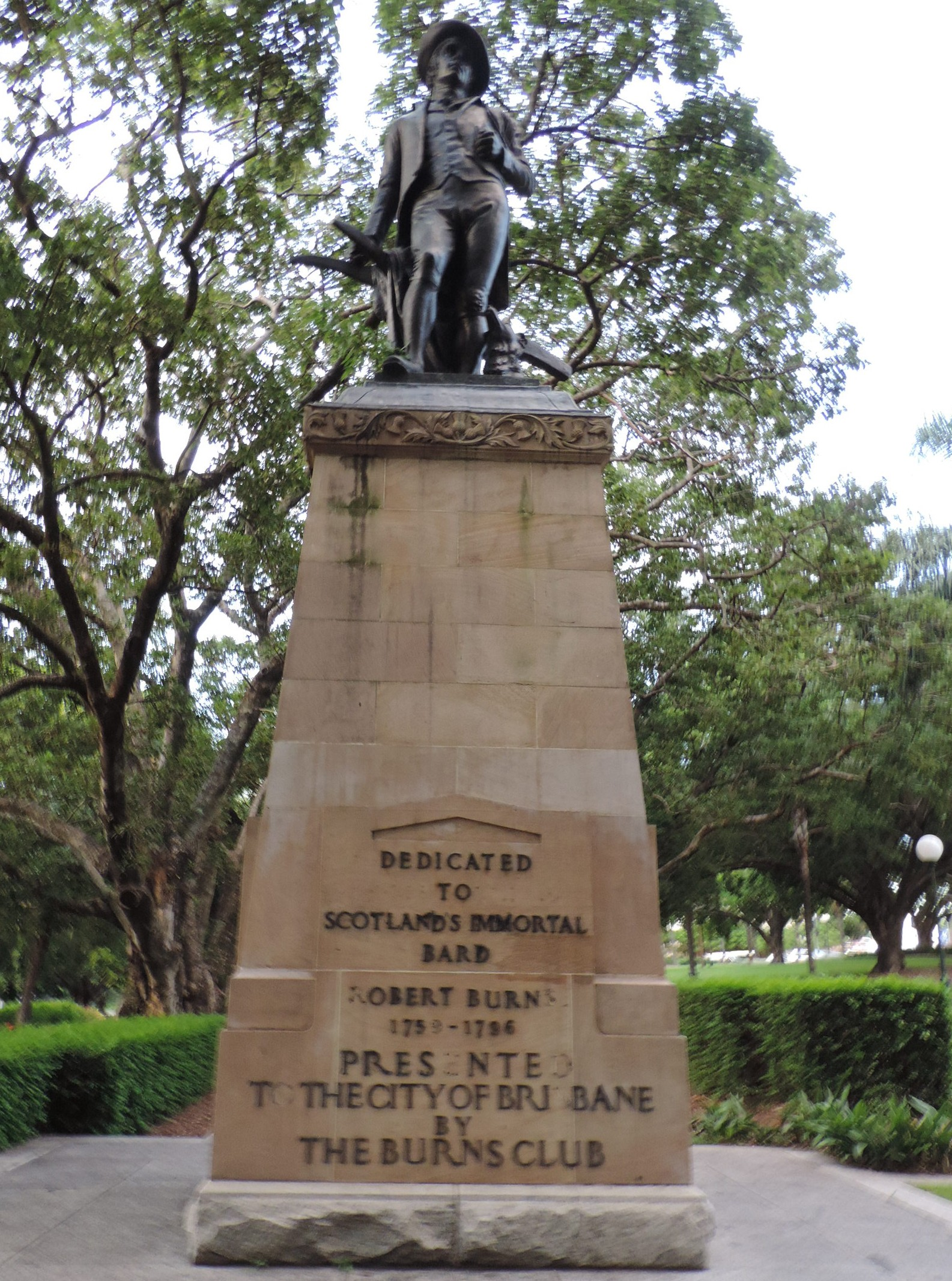
Brisbane, Australia

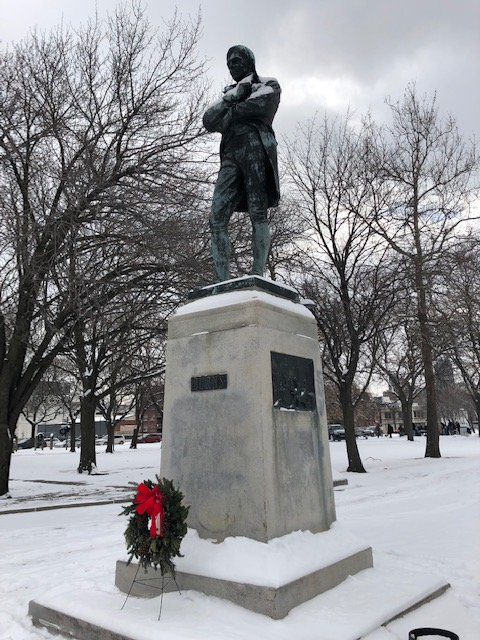
Detroit, Michigan, USA

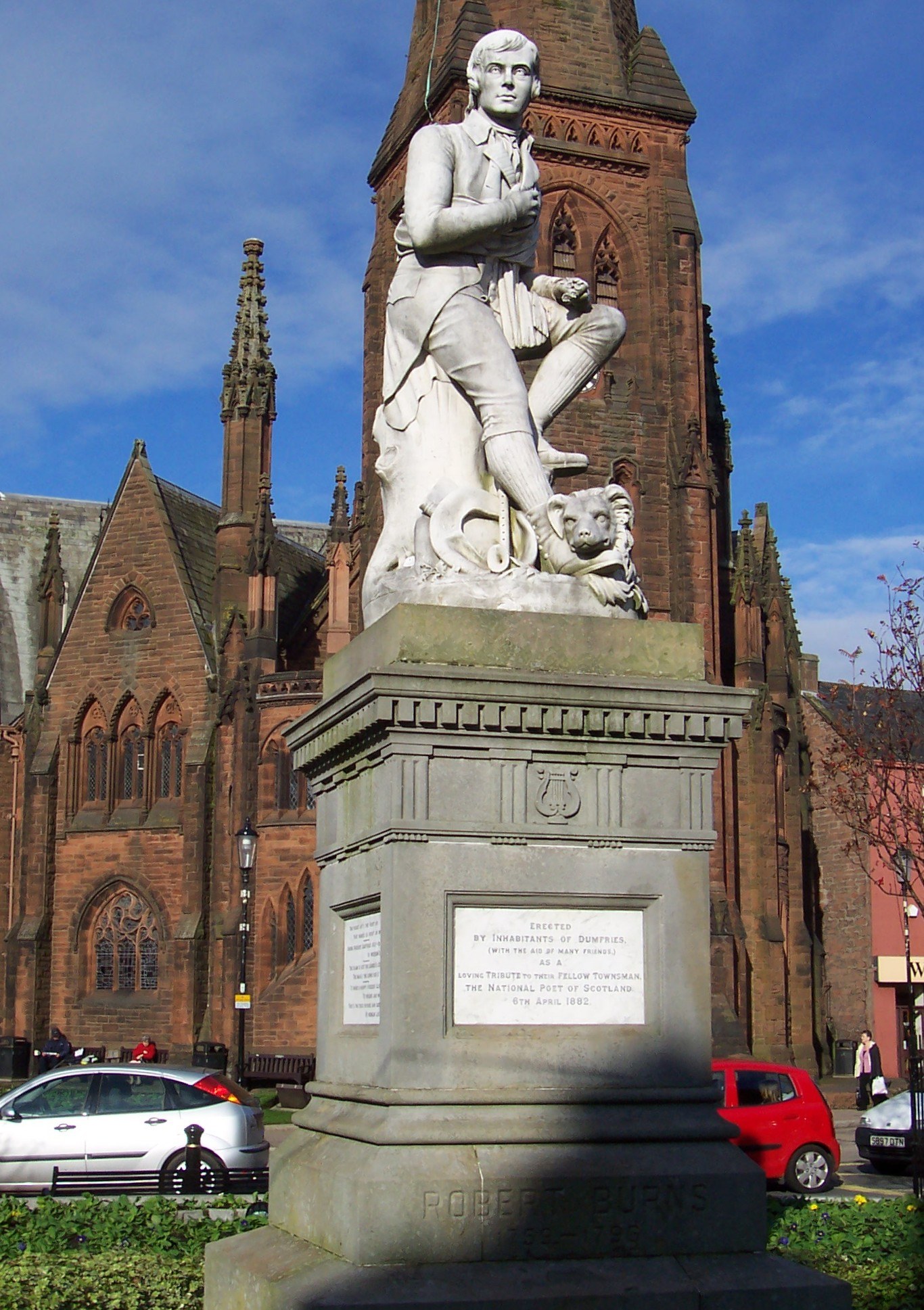
Dumfries, Scotland

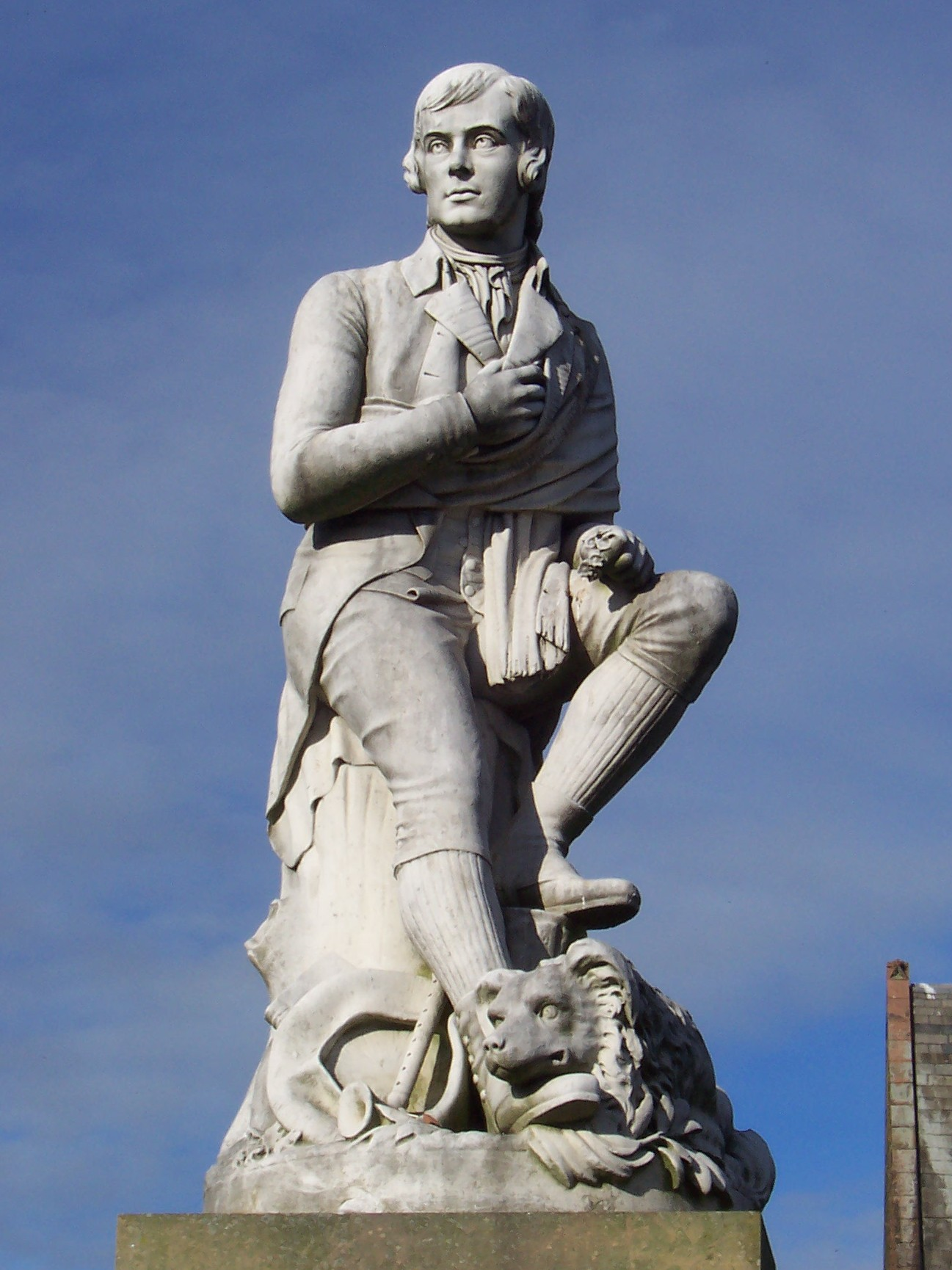
Dumfries, Scotland, close-up

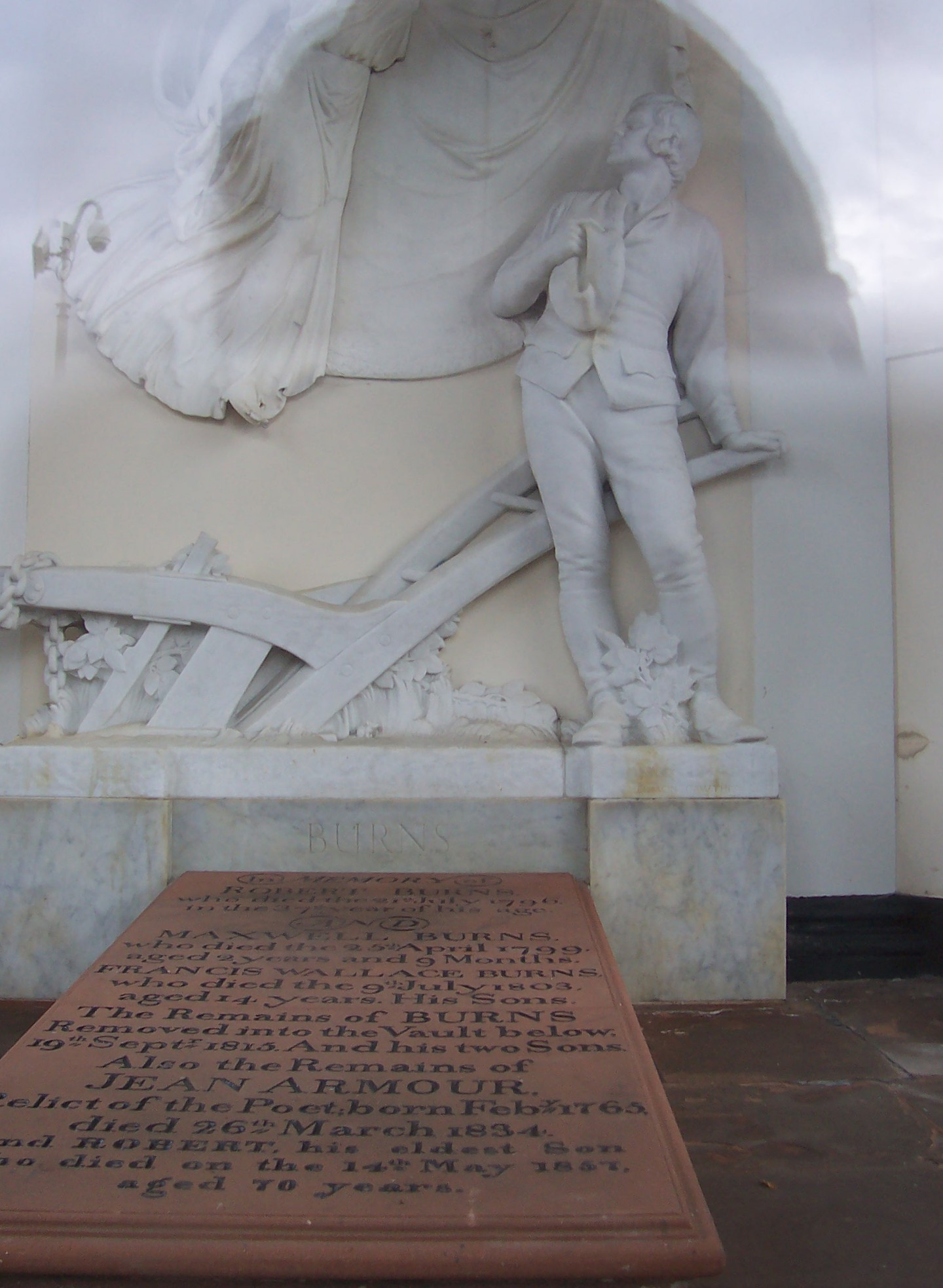
Dumfries, Scotland, Burns's mausoleum

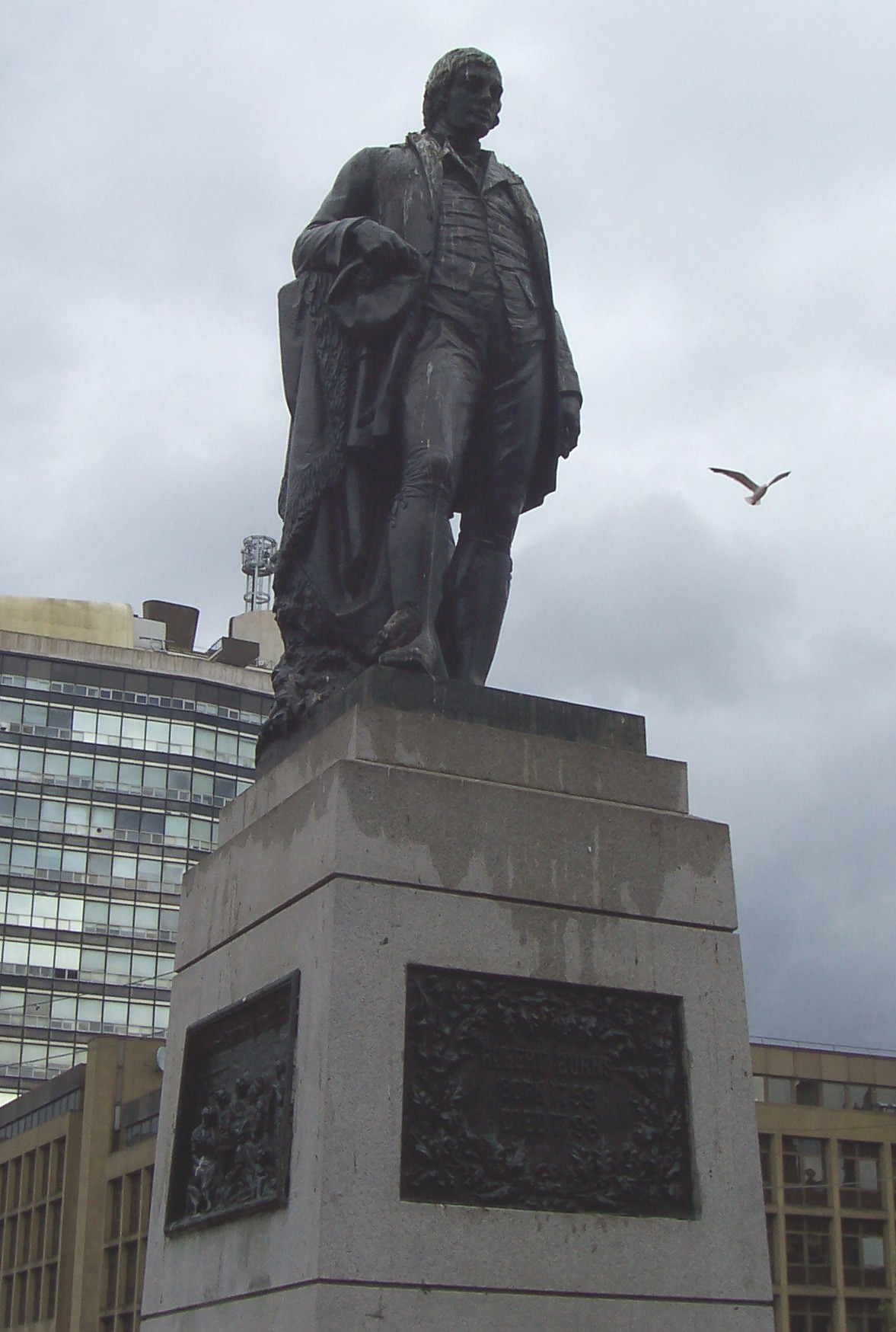
Glasgow, Scotland

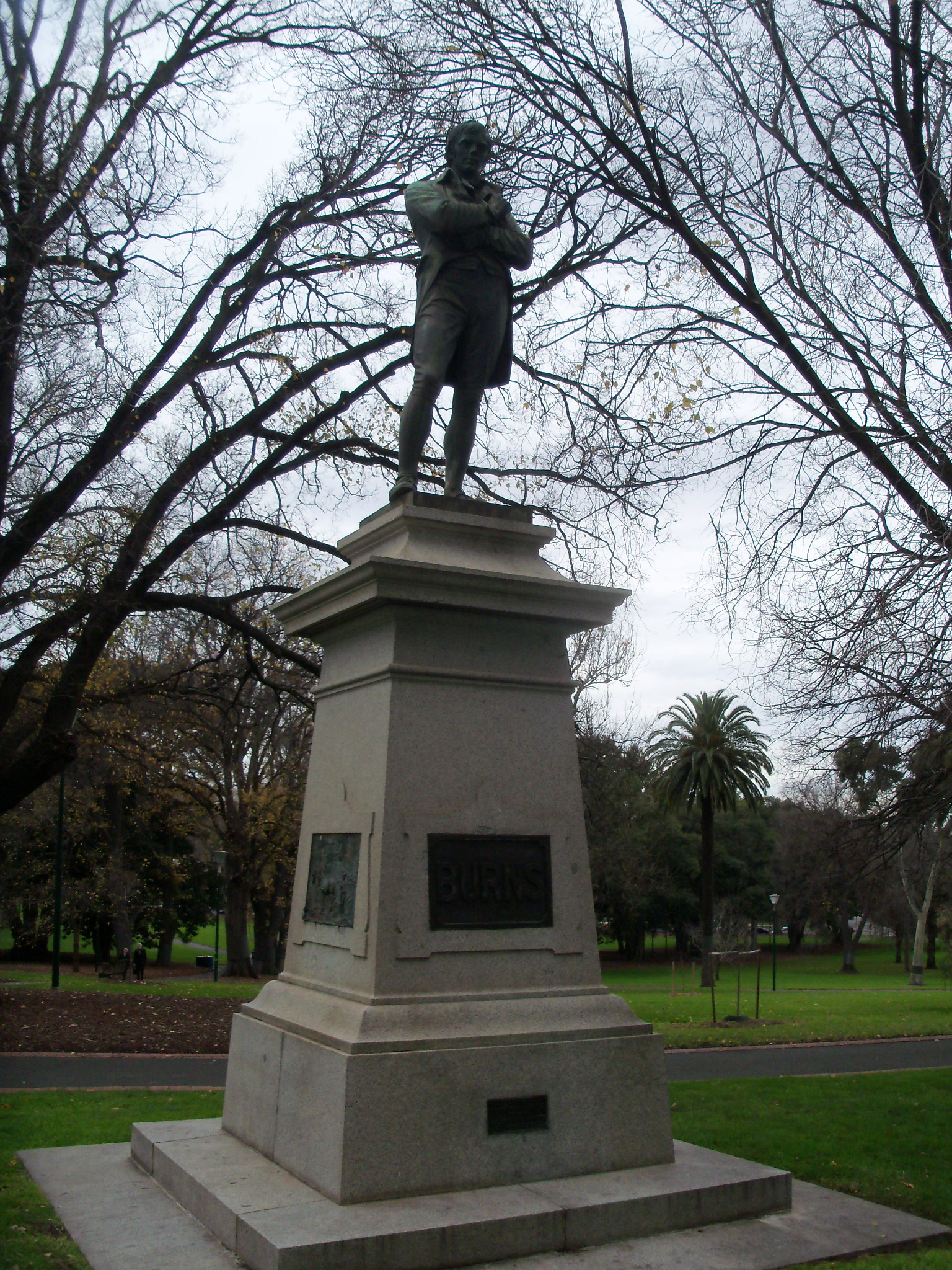
Melbourne, Australia

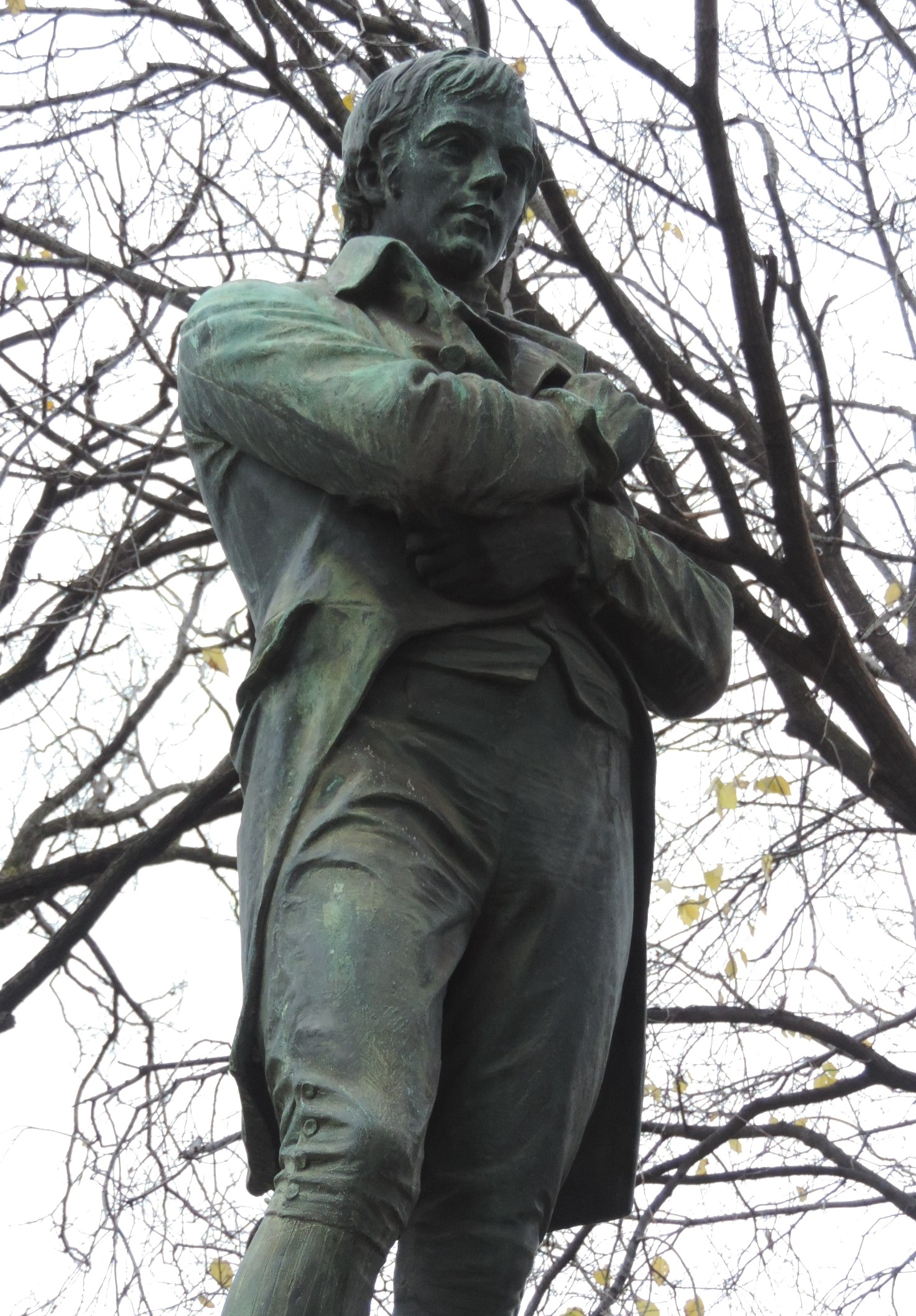
Melbourne, Australia, close-up

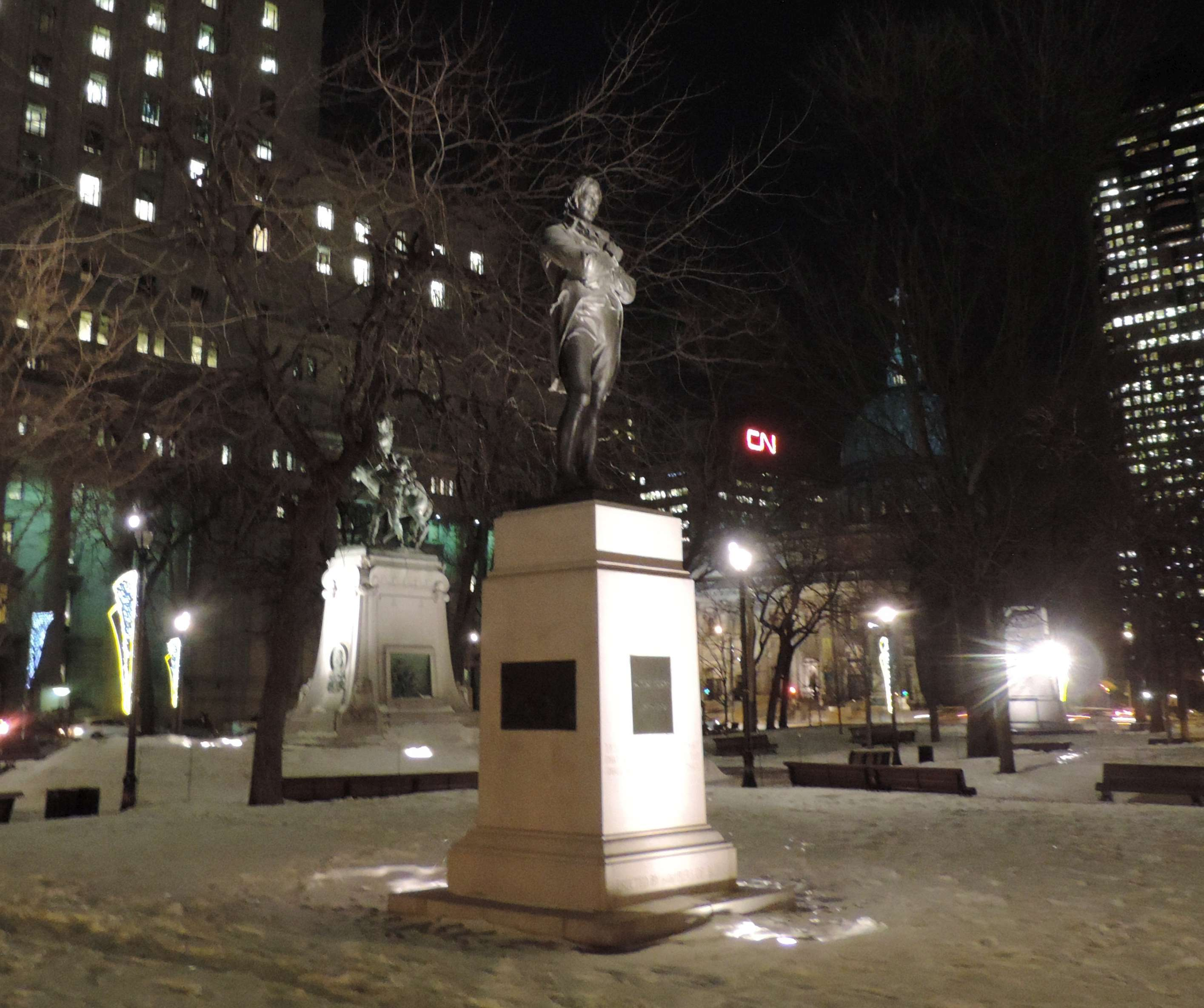
Montreal, Quebec, Canada

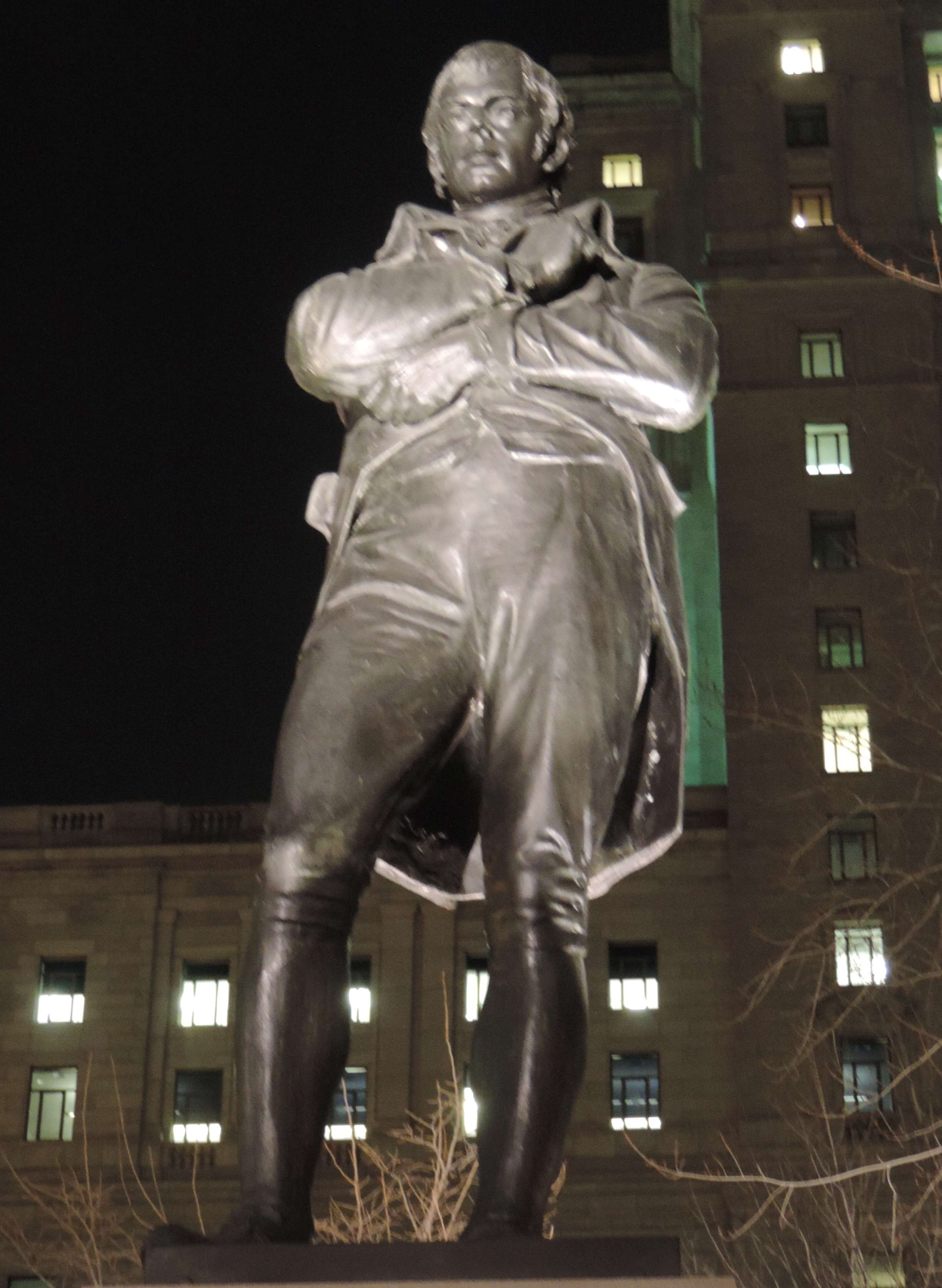
Montreal, Quebec, Canada, close-up

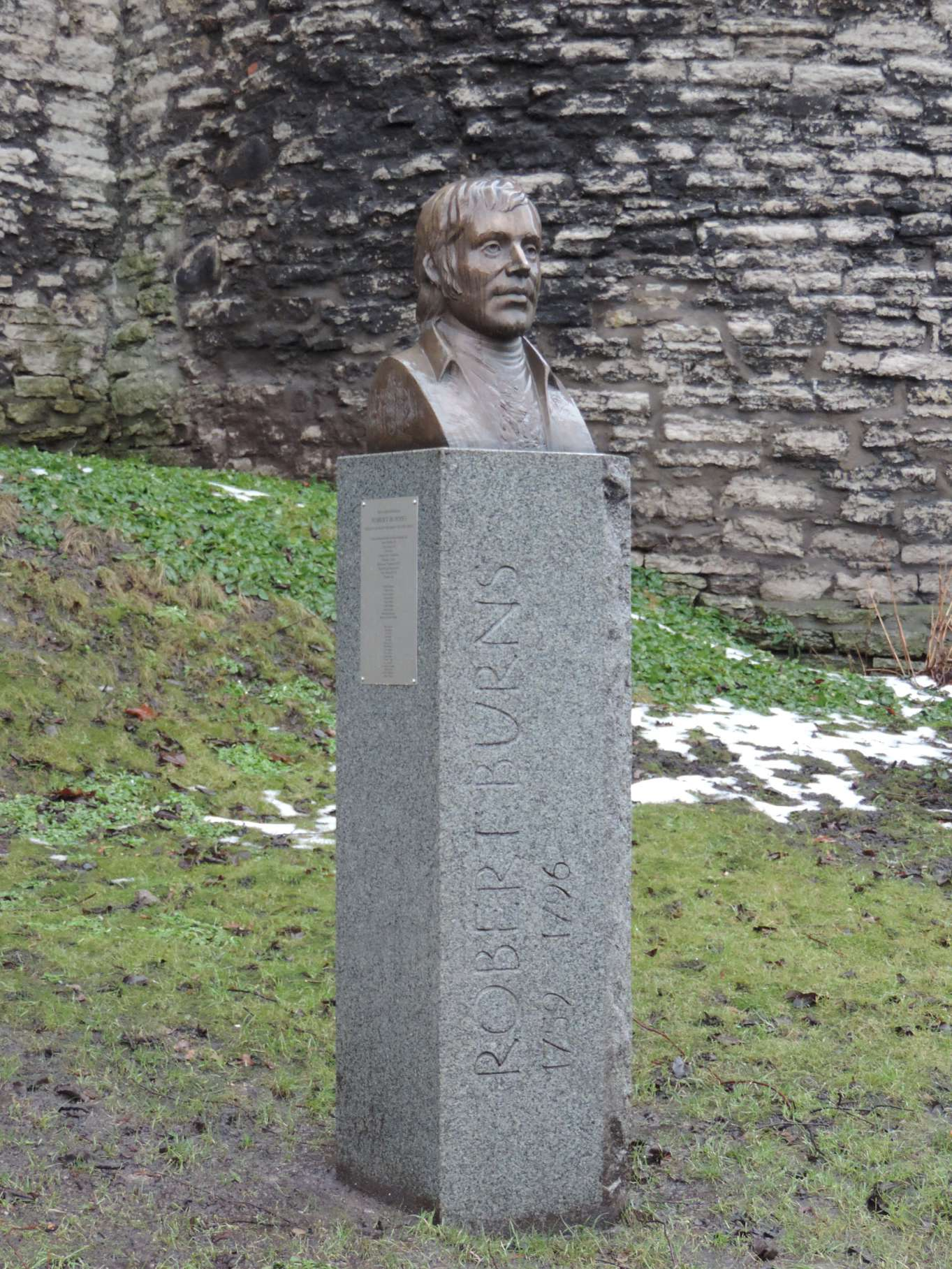
Tallinn, Estonia

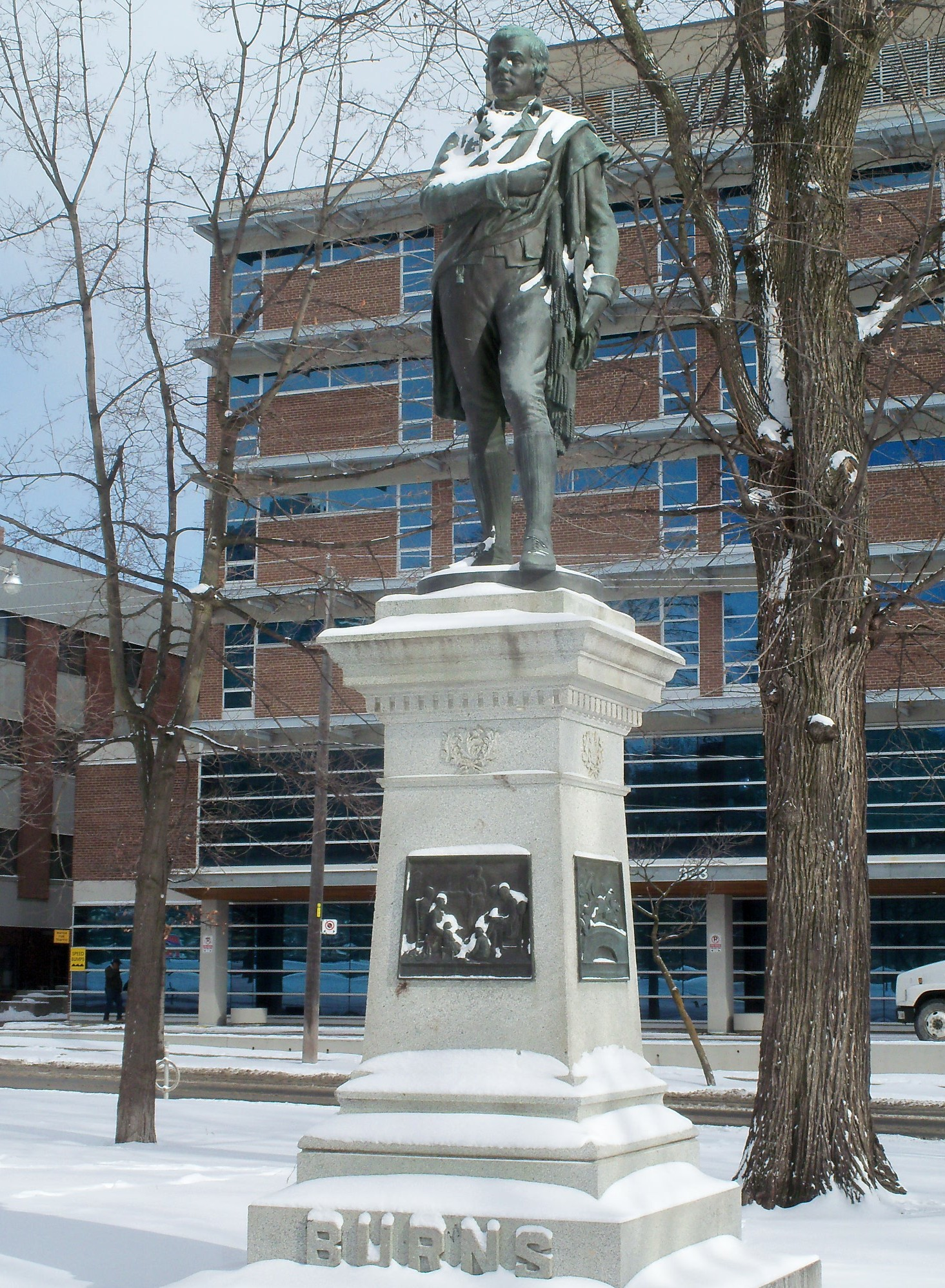
Toronto, Ontario, Canada

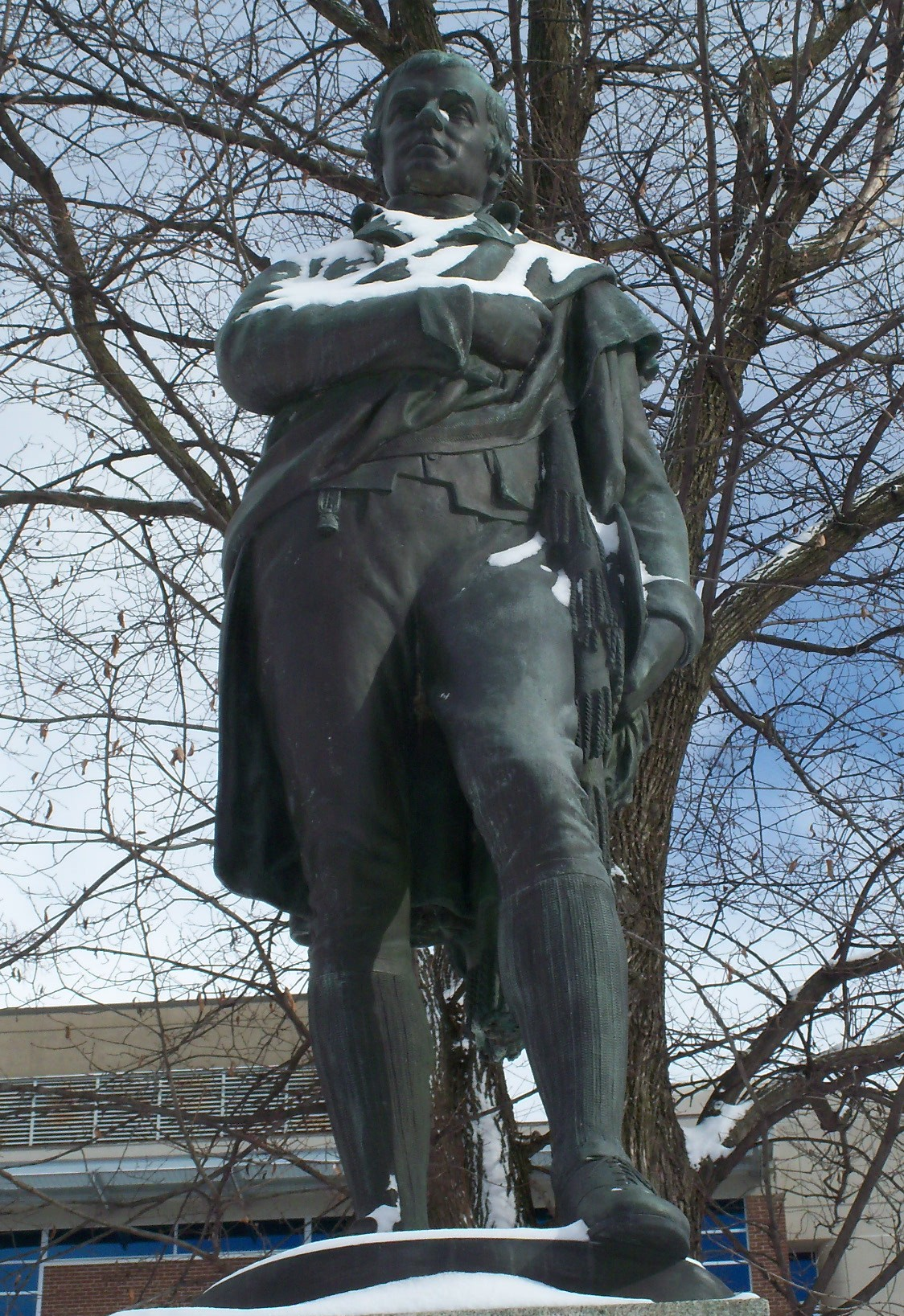
Toronto, Ontario, Canada, close-up

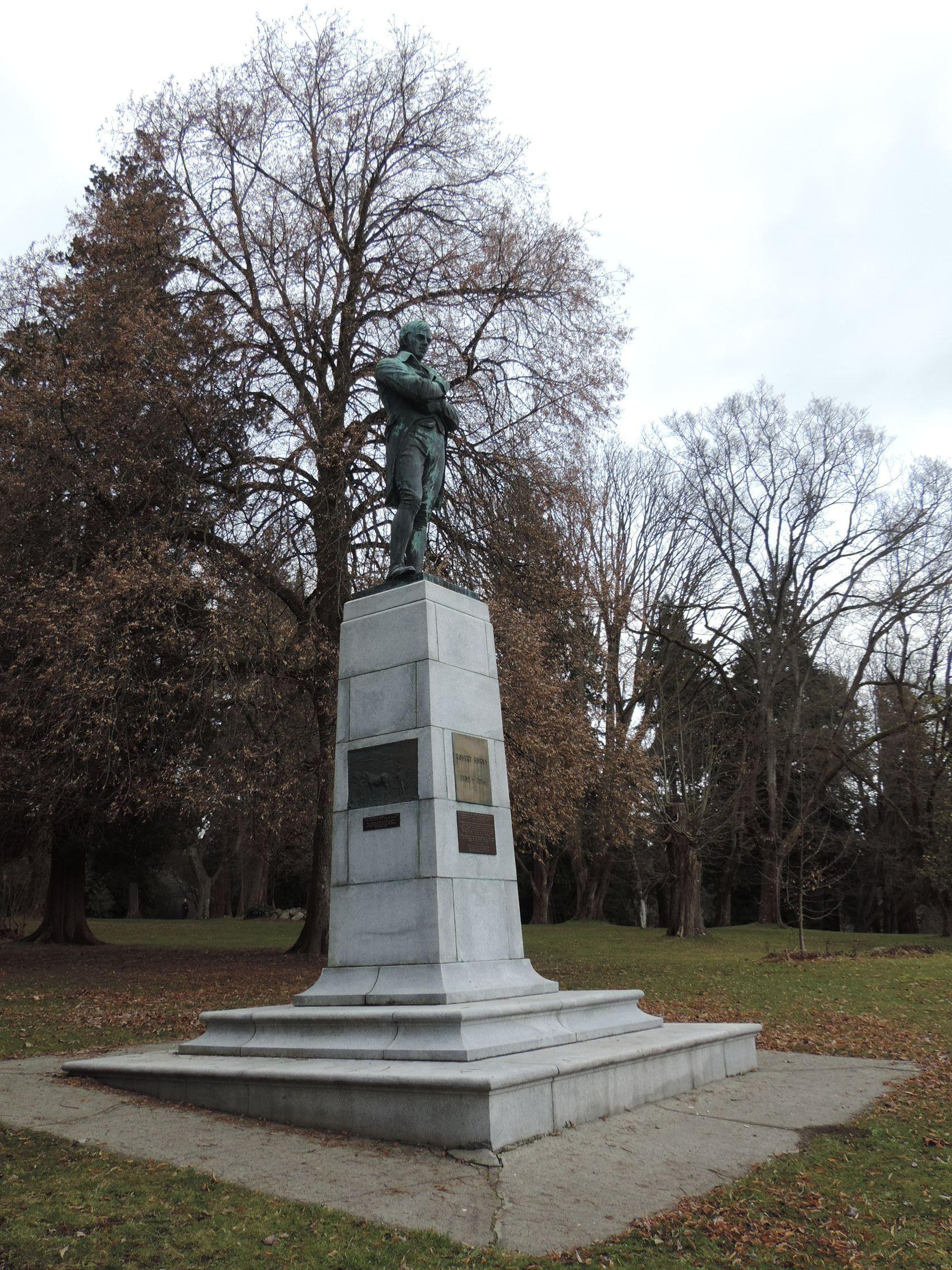
Vancouver, British Columbia, Canada

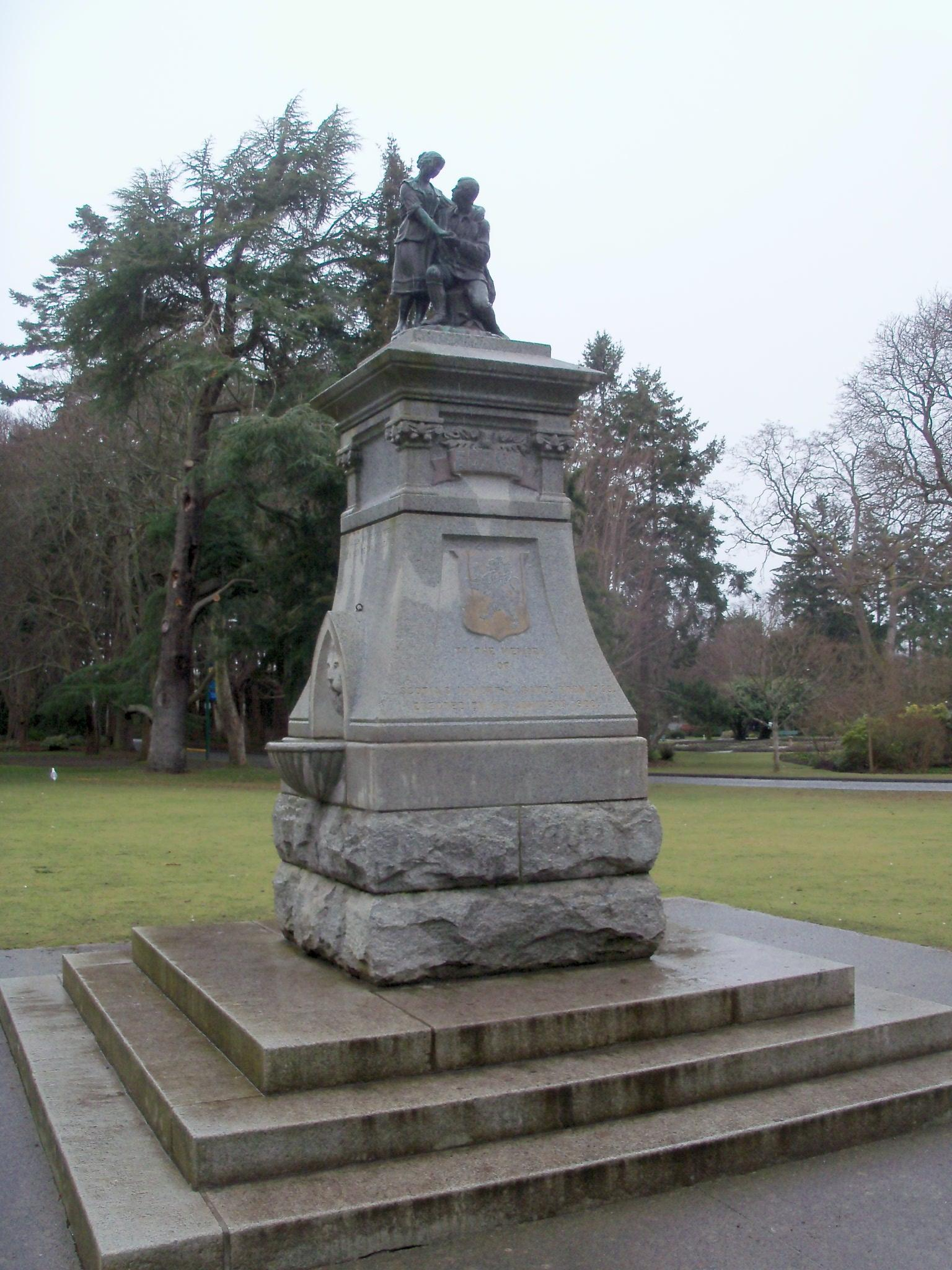
Victoria, British Columbia, Canada

== See also ==
- Burns memorials by sculptor John Steell

== Bibliography ==
- Sharon Alker, Leith Davis, and Holly Faith Nelson (eds), "Robert Burns and Transatlantic Culture", Ashgate Publishing, 2012, ISBN 1283429306.
- Thomas Keith, "Burns Statues in North America, a Survey" in Robert Burns & America, ed. by G. Ross Roy (Fife, Scotland & Columbia, SC: Thomas Cooper Library & Akros Publications, 2001): 23-33
- Thomas Keith "Burns Statues in North America," in The Burns Chronicle (Kilmarnock, Scotland: The Burns Federation, 2001): 71-83, https://www.rbwf.org.uk/digitised-chronicles
- Elizabeth A. Sudduth (compiler), "The G. Ross Roy Collection of Robert Burns: An Illustrated Catalogue", ISBN 978-1-57003-829-7.
