= List of public art in Fredericton =

This is a list of permanent public art in Fredericton, New Brunswick, Canada.

The list contains only works of permanent public art freely accessible in public spaces, and not, for example, works inside museums that charge admission, or that are installed for short-term display.

== Artworks ==
Image	Title / subject	Location and coordinates	Date	Artist / designer	Type	Material	Dimensions	Designation	Owner / administrator	Wikidata	Notes
More images	The Beavers	Beaverbrook Art Gallery 45°57′35.5″N 66°38′8.5″W	1959	Claude Roussel	Sculpture						
More images	Carleton and York Regiment Memorial	Garrison District 45°57′47″N 66°38′25″W			Memorial						
More images	Fort Nashwaak Monument	North side of the Bill Thorpe Walking Bridge 45°57′28″N 66°37′28.5″W			Monument						
More images	Fredericton Cenotaph	Intersection of Church Street, King Street, and Queen Street 45°57′30″N 66°38′5″W	November 11, 1923		Cenotaph						
More images	Fredericton Firefighter Memorial	South Riverfront Trail 45°57′58″N 66°38′59.5″W			Memorial						
More images	James Dunn Memorial Fountain	South Riverfront Trail, near the Beaverbrook Art Gallery 45°57′32″N 66°38′4″W			Fountain						
More images	New Brunswick Legislative Building memorial	Grounds of the New Brunswick Legislative Building 45°57′34.5″N 66°38′11.5″W			Memorial						
	New Brunswick Medical Society bench	South Riverfront Trail 45°57′52″N 66°38′30″W			Bench						
	New Brunswick Paramedic Monument	South Riverfront Trail 45°57′57.5″N 66°39′18″W			Monument						
More images	New Brunswick Peace Officers' Memorial	South Riverfront Trail 45°57′57″N 66°39′2″W			Memorial						
More images	Saint John River monument	South Riverfront Trail 45°57′57.5″N 66°39′18″W			Monument						
More images	Statue of Lord Beaverbrook	South Riverfront Trail, near the Beaverbrook Art Gallery 45°57′33″N 66°38′5″W	August 28, 1957	Vincent Apap	Statue	Bronze					
More images	Robert Burns Memorial Statue	South Riverfront Trail, near the Beaverbrook Art Gallery 45°57′32.5″N 66°38′4.5″W	Octoer 18, 1906	William Grant Stevenson	Statue	Bronze					
More images	Thomas Temple Fountain	Queen Street, near the Beaverbrook Art Gallery 45°57′36.5″N 66°38′10.5″W			Fountain						
More images	United Empire Loyalists Monument	Old Burial Ground 45°57′36″N 66°38′34″W			Monument						
More images	Watermark	South Riverfront Trail 45°57′49.5″N 66°38′23.5″W	2016	Gerald Beaulieu	Sculpture						
