= Statue of Lord Beaverbrook =

Statue in Fredericton, New Brunswick, Canada

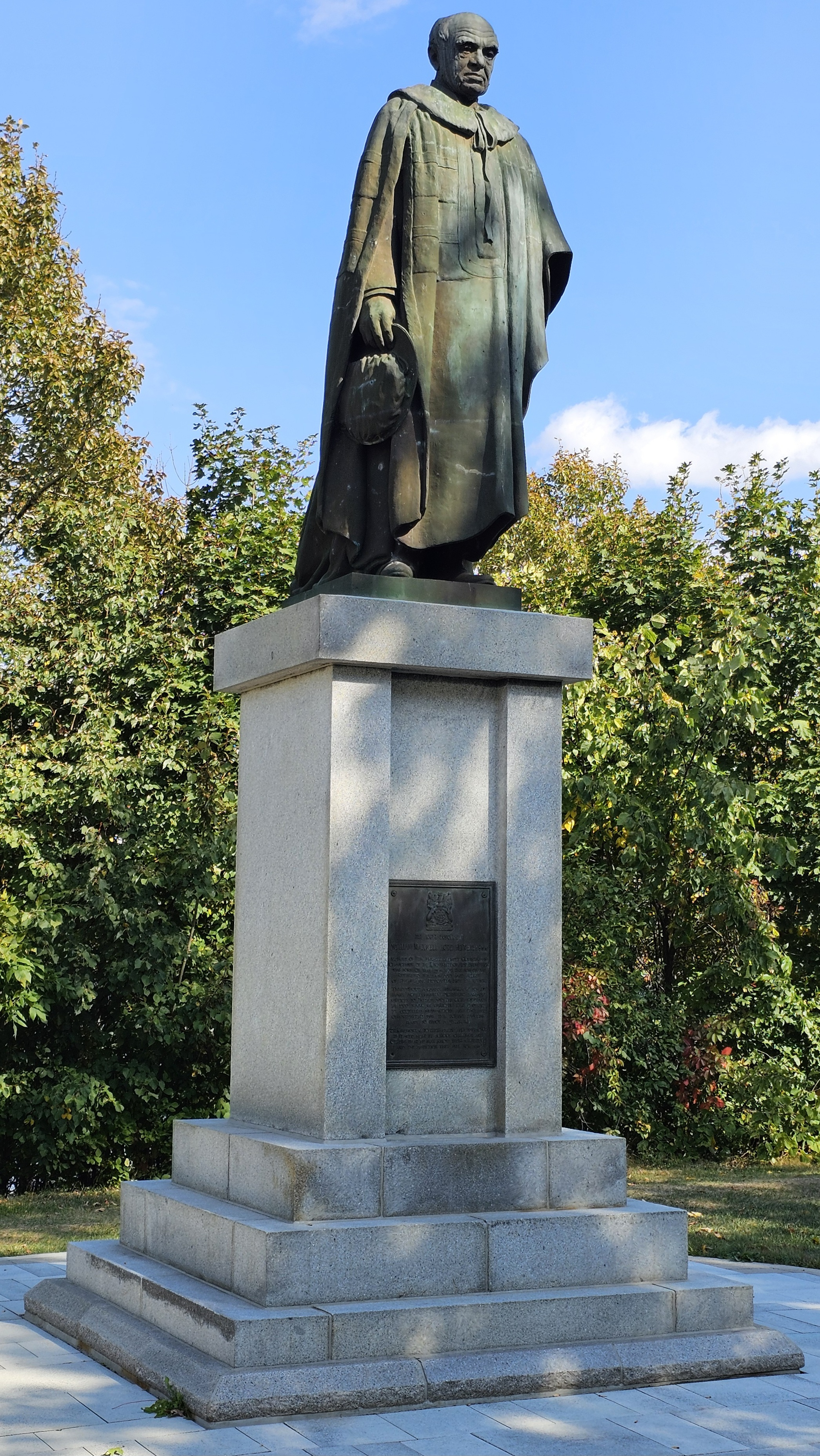
- The statue in 2025
- Interactive map of Statue of Lord Beaverbrook
- Location: Fredericton, New Brunswick, Canada
- Coordinates: 45.959196°N 66.634679°W
- Designer: Vincent Apap
- Type: Statue
- Material: Bronze
- Height: 9 feet (2.7 m) (Statue); 11 feet (3.4 m) (Pedestal)
- Dedicated date: August 28, 1957
- Dedicated to: Max Aitken, 1st Baron Beaverbrook

A bronze statue of Max Aitken, 1st Baron Beaverbrook, designed by sculptor Vincent Apap, is located adjacent to the Beaverbrook Art Gallery in Fredericton, New Brunswick, Canada. The statue was initially dedicated in Officers' Square in 1957 but was removed from this site in 2019 as part of a planned sculpture garden near the art gallery. It currently stands in a greenspace near the gallery, alongside the James Dunn Memorial Fountain and the Robert Burns Memorial Statue.

== History ==
=== Creation and dedication ===
The idea for a statue dedicated to Max Aitken, 1st Baron Beaverbrook, was first proposed by night watchman T. Donald "Shun" Ryan of Fredericton. Lord Beaverbrook was a native of New Brunswick who had sponsored several philanthropic enterprises in both the city and province. Examples of this included the Beaverbrook Art Gallery, which was named in his honor, and the James Dunn Memorial Fountain, a public art piece. In order to raise funds for the statue, school children were urged to donate money, with any child who donated $0.10 (equivalent to $1.15 in 2025) getting their name placed on a ledger that would be stored in the base of the statue. Sculptor Vincent Apap was commissioned to create the statue, which would be located in Officers' Square. On August 28, 1957, Ryan officially unveiled the statue in a ceremony that prominently featured the schoolchildren who had aided in the statue's funding. The monument consisted of a 9-foot (2.7-metre) bronze statue of Lord Beaverbrook atop an 11 ft (3.4 m) stone pedestal. On September 5 of that year, Lord Beaverbrook issued a statement thanking the children who had helped with the statue's creation.

=== Relocation ===
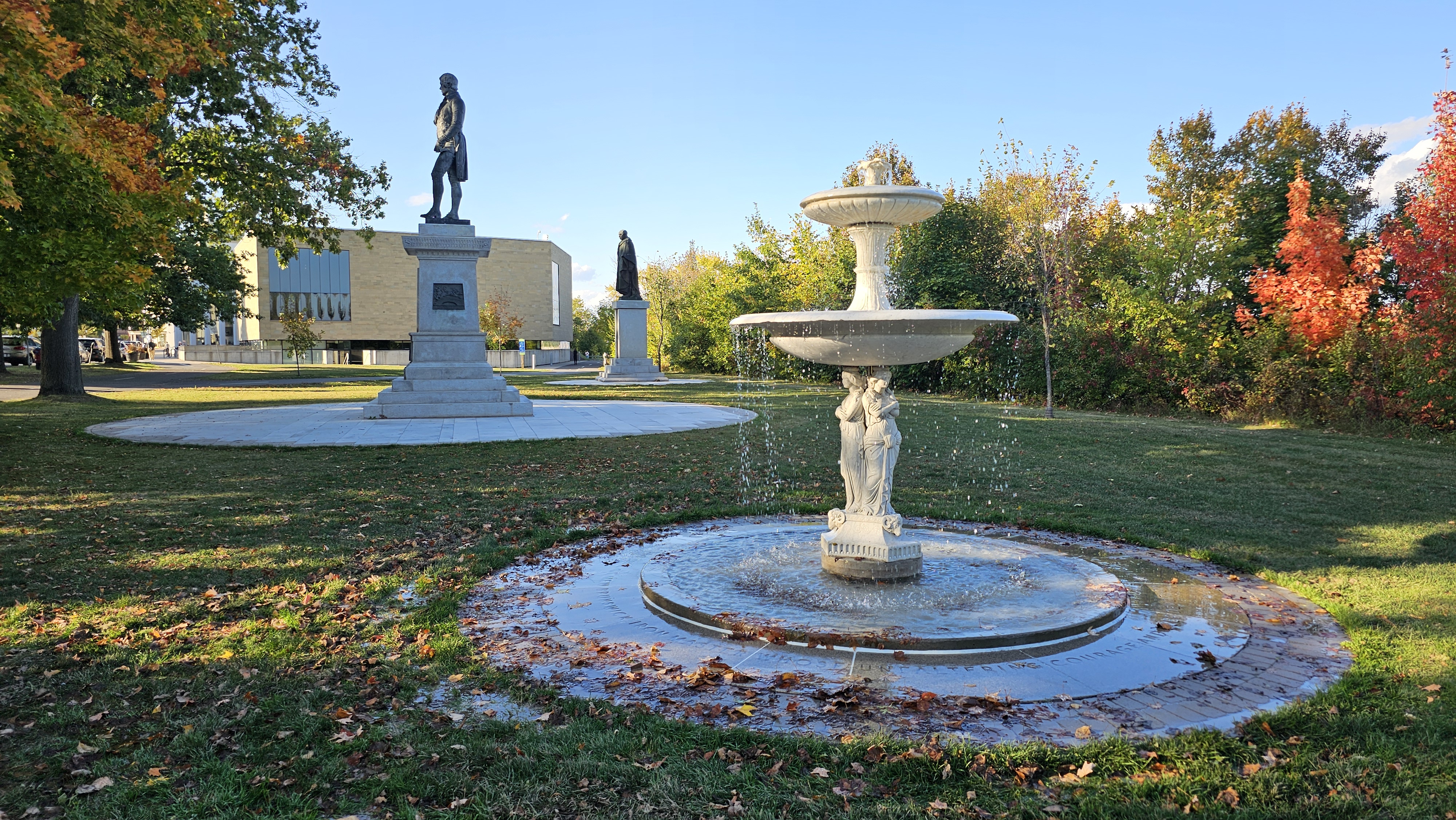
The statue (background) in 2025, in a sculpture garden with the Robert Burns Memorial Statue (left) and the James Dunn Memorial Fountain (foreground)

Beginning in January 2018, the Beaverbrook Art Gallery entered into discussions with the city government regarding a relocation of the Lord Beaverbrook statue. Per the art gallery, the statue would be moved to an area near their facilities that they intended to turn into a sculpture garden, placing it alongside the Robert Burns Memorial Statue and the James Dunn Memorial Fountain in a greenspace. According to Mayor Mike O'Brien, the city would continue to own both the statue and the land it sits on. By October, the art gallery announced that they had allocated $100,000 ($123,000 in 2025) towards the project, with $10,000 ($12,000 in 2025) specifically set aside for the Lord Beaverbrook statue. This money was matched by funds from the Fredericton City Council. The relocation coincided with a planned renovation of Officers' Square that the city planned to begin in spring of the following year. However, the city noted that, as the statue was included in Provincial Heritage Site Designation documentation for Officers' Square, a permit from the government of New Brunswick would be required before it could be relocated. By August 2019, the city had received all necessary permits and approvals to move ahead with the statue's relocation and the square's renovation. In October 2019, the statue was removed and placed in storage, with plans to place it in the new sculpture garden the following year.

== See also ==
- List of public art in Fredericton
- The Beavers, a statue gifted to Beaverbrook and formerly located next to this statue
