= Robert Burns Memorial Statue (Fredericton) =

Monument in New Brunswick, Canada

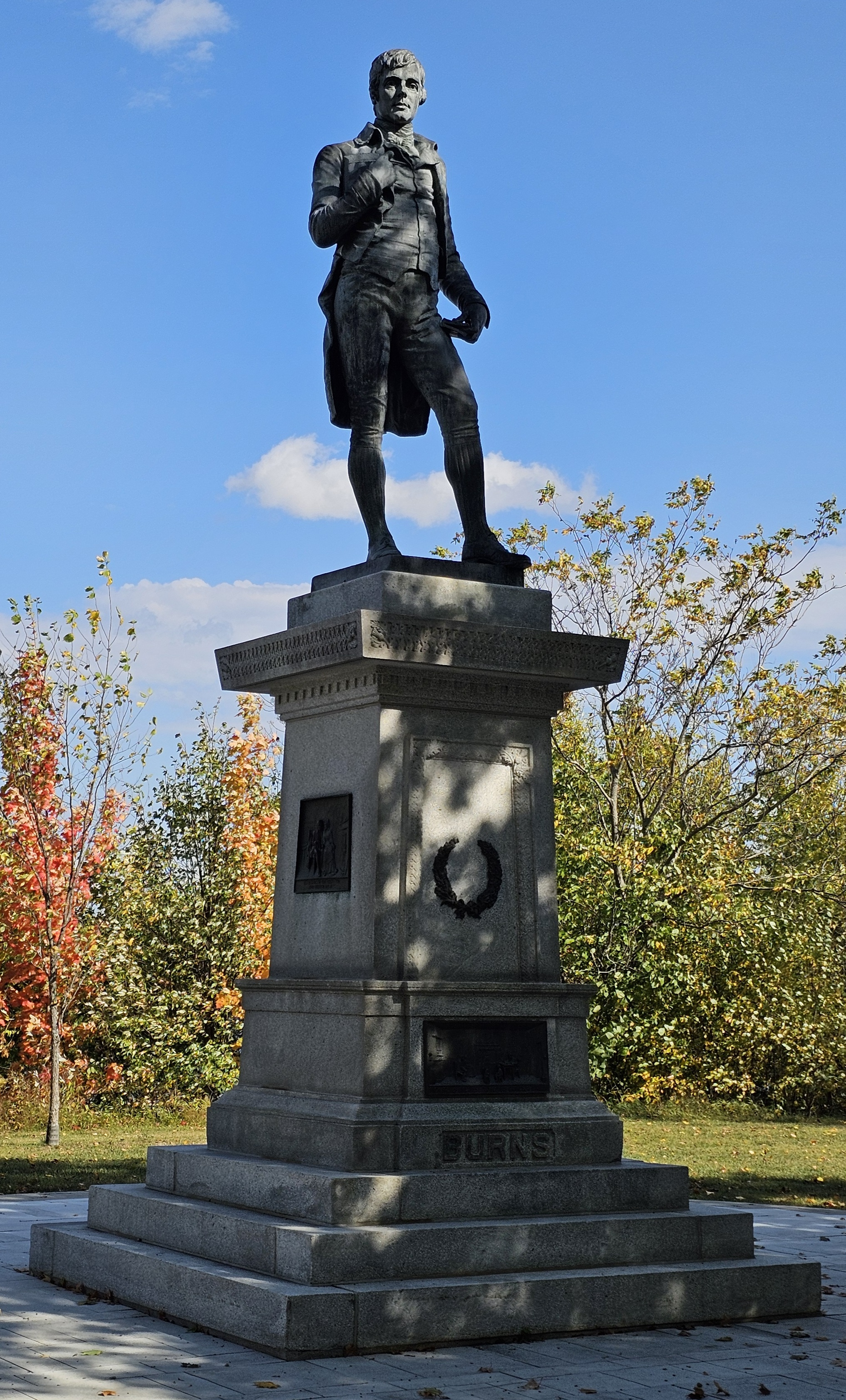
- The statue in 2025
- Interactive map of Robert Burns Memorial Statue
- Location: 799 Queen Street; Fredericton, New Brunswick, Canada
- Coordinates: 45°57′32″N 66°38′05″W
- Designer: William Grant Stevenson (statue); McIntosh-Gullet Granite Company (pedestal)
- Type: Statue
- Material: Bronze (statue); Granite (pedestal)
- Height: 10 ft 6 in (3.20 m) (statue); 12 ft (3.7 m) (pedestal) (Note: Sources vary on the heights for both the pedestal and statue. Regarding the statue, most sources give a height of 10 ft 6 in (3.20 m), though a 2024 article in the Telegraph-Journal gives a slightly smaller value of 10 ft (3.0 m). Sources are more varied with regards to the pedestal, with values of 10 ft 6 in (3.20 m), 12 ft (3.7 m), and 20 ft (6.1 m), with 12 ft (3.7 m) being the most reported value.)
- Dedicated date: October 18, 1906
- Dedicated to: Robert Burns

The Robert Burns Memorial Statue is a monumental statue in Fredericton, New Brunswick, Canada. It was designed by Scottish sculptor William Grant Stevenson and dedicated in 1906. It currently stands on the Green, a park adjacent to the Saint John River, near Christ Church Cathedral. It consists of a bronze statue of the Scottish poet Robert Burns atop a granite pedestal. Ornaments on the pedestal include bronze panels depicting scenes from some of Burns's works.

Plans for the statue originated from Fredericton's Society of St. Andrew in 1903, with that group's president serving as the chairman for the monument committee and overseeing fundraising efforts. Stevenson, who had worked on the creation of other statues of Burns, was commissioned for the statue, while the pedestal was created by the McIntosh-Gullet Granite Company of Toronto. The memorial was dedicated in a large ceremony held on Thanksgiving, October 18, 1906, with an oration given by Lieutenant Governor Duncan Cameron Fraser of Nova Scotia. The event attracted 5,000 people, which was considered one of the largest gatherings in the city's history. The monument marked the first public statue erected in the province.

In 1911, the statue was recast due to defects in the original casting. In 1956, the statue was relocated due to the construction of the Beaverbrook Art Gallery. In the early 21st century, the statue underwent repairs and was incorporated into a sculpture garden by the gallery, situated near a statue of Lord Beaverbrook and a public fountain.

== Background ==
The idea of erecting a statue in honor of the Scottish poet Robert Burns in Fredericton first arose during a November 1903 meeting of the Fredericton Society of St. Andrew. The proposal was enthusiastically supported by the members, and by the end of the meeting, $2,800 (equivalent to $105,200 in 2025) had been pledged towards the monument's creation. Oswald S. Crocket, the president of the society, served as the chairman for the Provincial Burns Memorial Committee. Crocket proposed that funds be raised from other Scottish heritage groups, and in total, fundraising came exclusively from Scottish Canadians. In total, the project cost $6,500 ($217,700 in 2025). For the pedestal, Crocket commissioned the McIntosh-Gullet Granite Company of Toronto, while William Grant Stevenson, a sculptor from Edinburgh, was commissioned to design the statue.

== Dedication ==
The statue was dedicated on October 18, 1906, Thanksgiving, becoming the first public statue erected in both the city and province as a whole. While Robert Burns Day is celebrated on January 25, Thanksgiving was chosen due to the long weekend. The ceremony attracted over 5,000 spectators, including members of Scottish heritage groups from around the region, with the Telegraph-Journal reporting that there were "representatives from seemingly every city and town in the Maritimes". Many civil and religious officials were also in attendance, including the mayors of the New Brunswick municipalities of Campbellton, Chatham, Moncton, Newcastle, Saint John, St. Stephen, Sussex, and Woodstock. A 1911 book discussing the event called it the largest gathering of people in the city's history. It was situated directly across from the entrance to the New Brunswick Legislative Building, in a park area near the Saint John River called the Green.

At its dedication, the statue was covered by the Union Jack. The ceremony began with statements from several elected officials, after which the statue was unveiled by Belle J. Hutchison. Hutchison was the daughter of the president of the Highland Society of Miramichi, who was a member of Parliament. Duncan Cameron Fraser, the lieutenant governor of Nova Scotia, served as the orator for the event. In a departure from the largely apolitical statements made earlier in the ceremony, Fraser gave a speech in which he stated that Burns had been an advocate for radical politics and argued that he would have supported progressive measures of the time, such as improved living conditions and electrification for poor residents of the Maritimes. The speech was well-received by the crowd. Following the formal dedication ceremonies, celebrations continued across Fredericton until after midnight. Shortly before departing by train, Edward Sears, the mayor of Saint John, gave an impromptu speech wherein he stated that his city should follow the example of Fredericton, recommending the creation of a statue of Samuel de Champlain, which was later erected in the city.

== Design ==
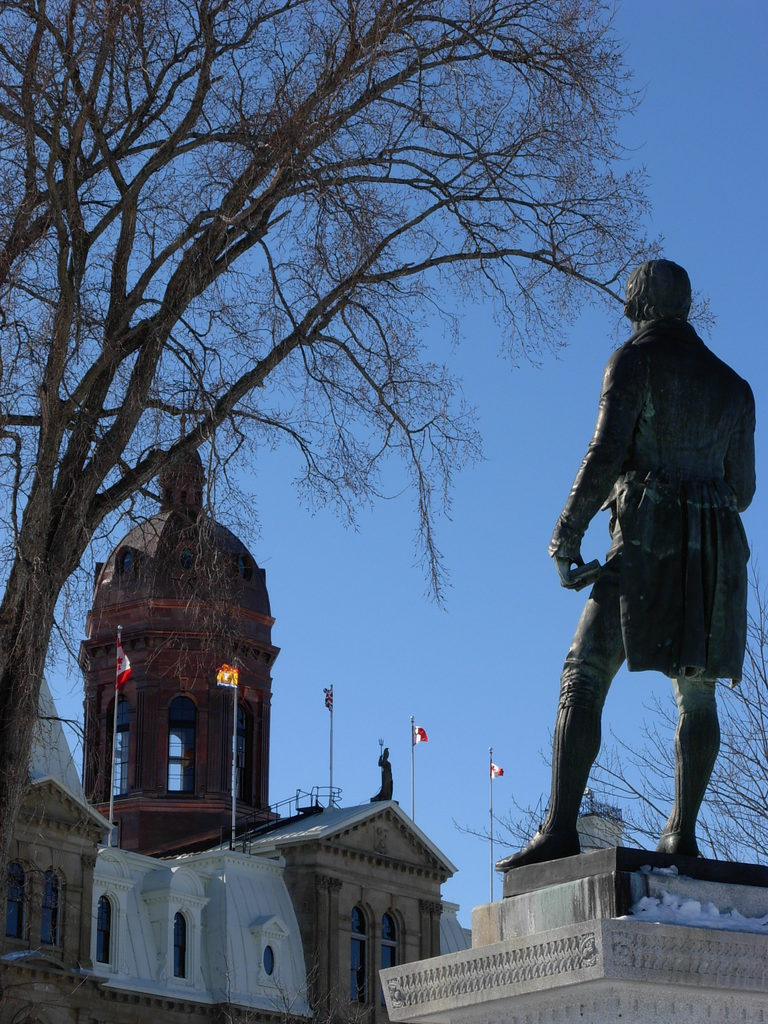
A rear view of the statue in 2007, with the New Brunswick Legislative Building in the background.

The monument consists of a bronze statue of Burns atop a granite pedestal. The pedestal is 12 feet (3.7 m) in height, while the statue is 10 ft 6 in (3.20 m) tall. The pedestal consisted of several steps with a plinth that contained bronze panels featuring scenes from several of Burns's stories in relief. The scenes depicted were from The Cotter's Saturday Night, John Anderson, My Jo, and "Tam o'Shanter". Additional ornaments on the pedestal include a wreath and Burns's last name in raised letters. Stevenson, who designed many statues of Burns during his career as a sculptor, considered the Fredericton statue to be his greatest work. The mould used for this statue was also used in the creation of a Burns statue in Chicago.

=== Gallery of plaques ===
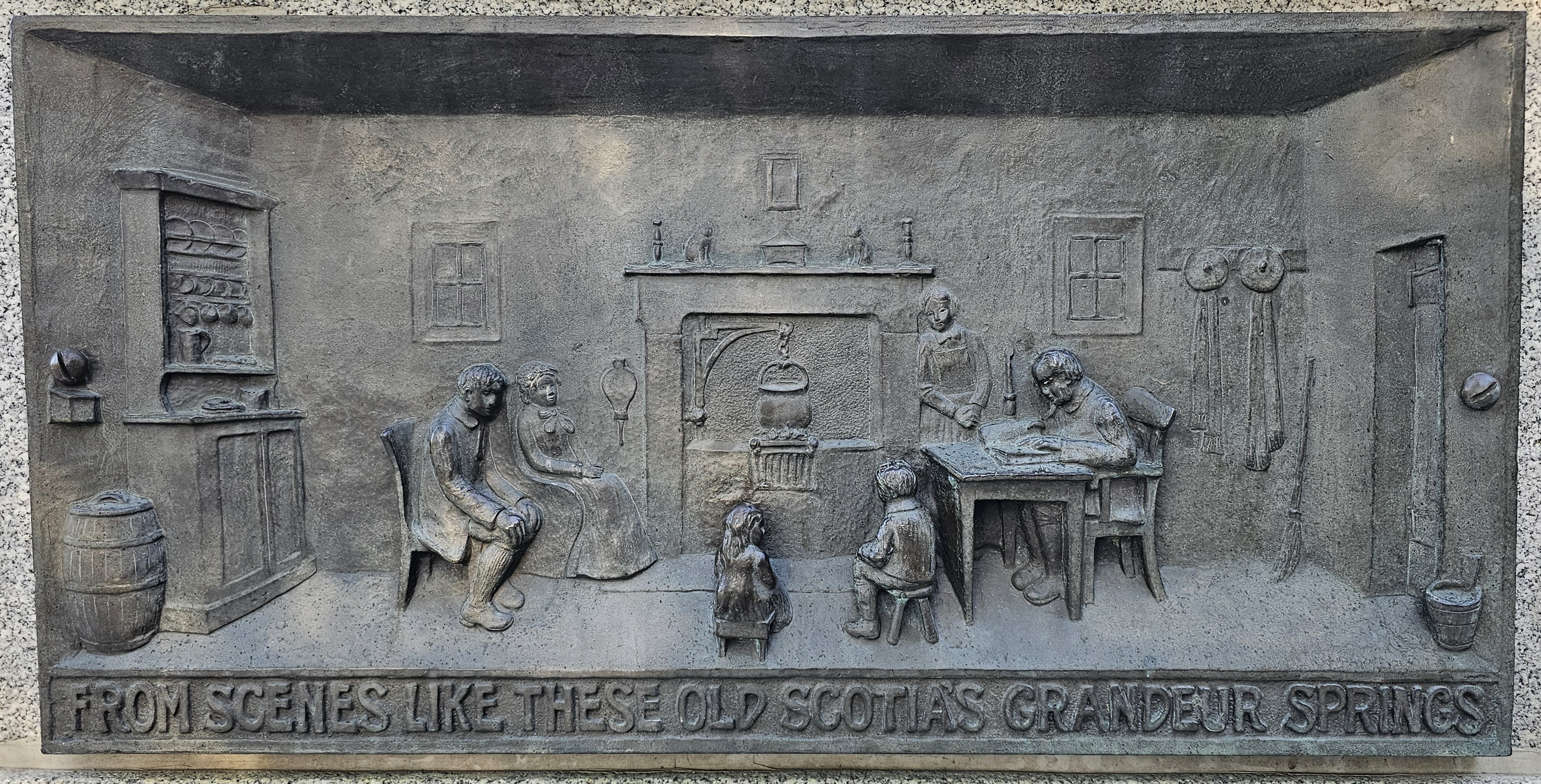
The Cotter's Saturday Night

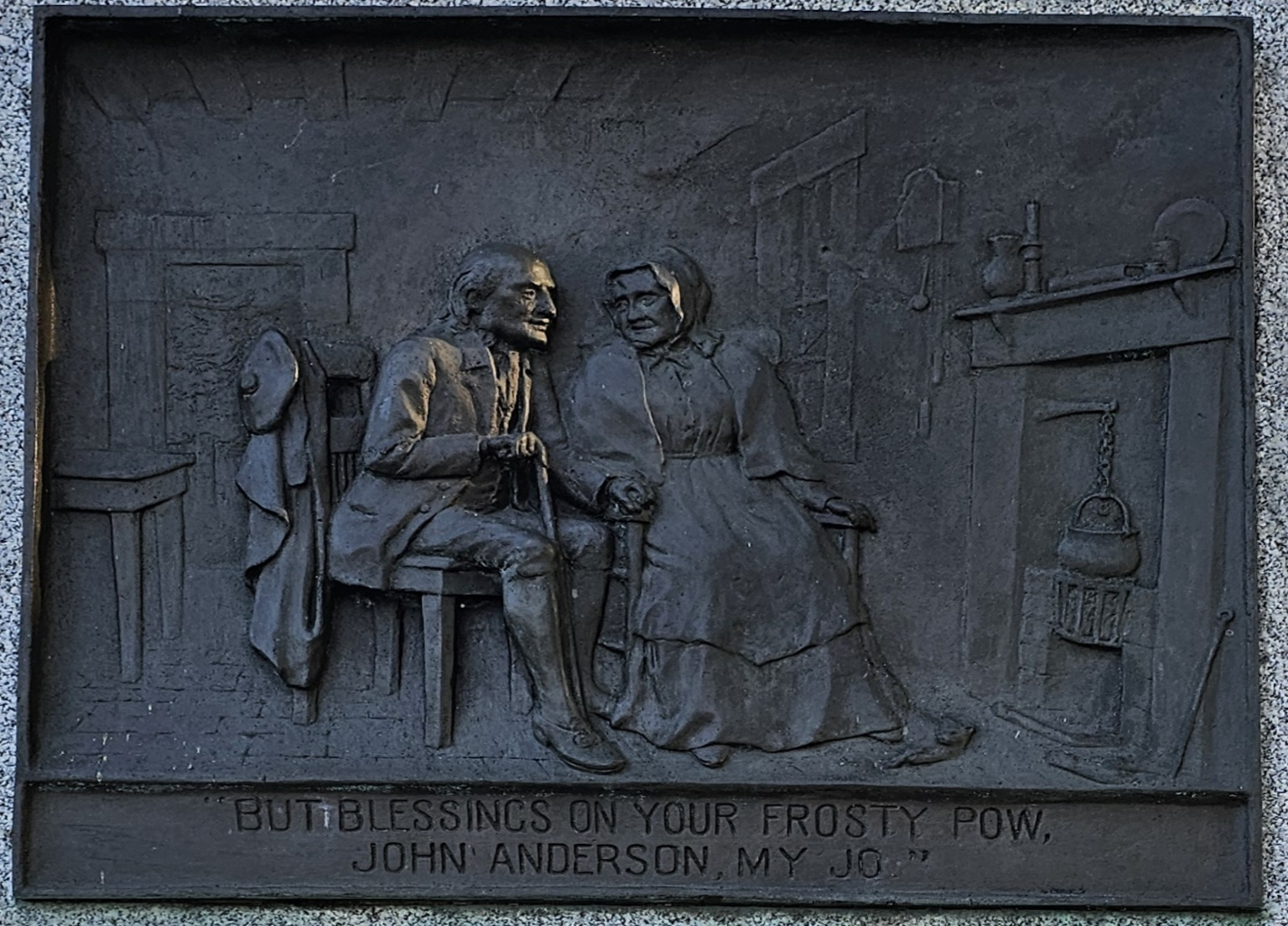
John Anderson, My Jo

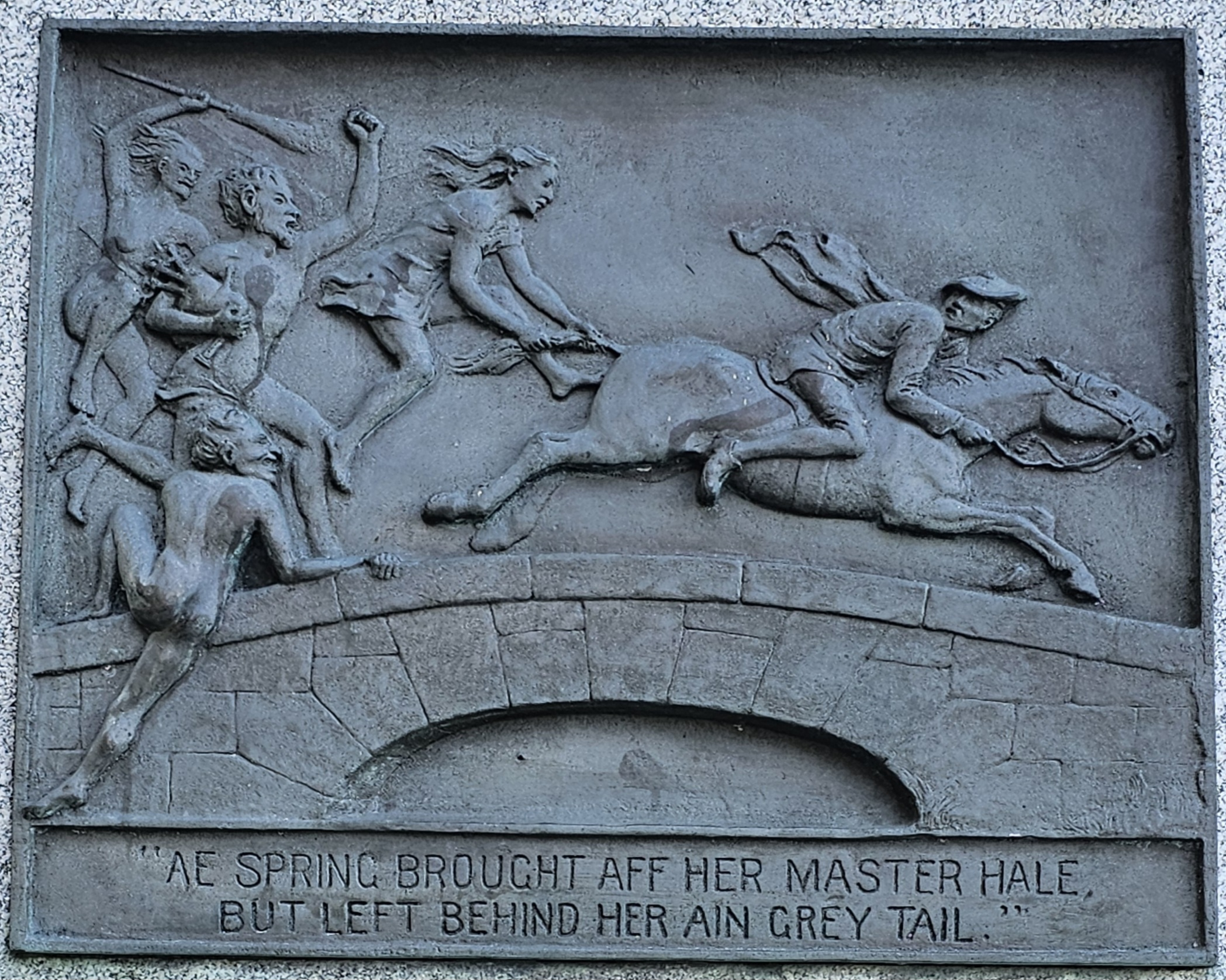
"Tam o'Shanter"

== Later history ==
There had been defects with the statue's casting, and within three years, rust began to appear, prompting a recasting of the statue. In September 1911, the new statue replaced the old one.

In late 1956, the planned construction of the Beaverbrook Art Gallery prompted the relocation of the monument east of its original location. As a result, the statue, still located on the Green, was positioned across the street from Christ Church Cathedral, next to a public fountain.

In 2008, the statue was taken down for repairs. However, by December 2010, the statue had yet to be restored, with the city government stating that it lacked the funds necessary to complete the repairs. Specifically, the city government stated that it could not afford to flood-proof the statue, which it said would cost $80,000 ($113,000 in 2025). While the government said that it could provide half of this total, it would require additional contributions to complete the project. In January 2011, the Irving family announced that they had made a donation to complete the repairs. The statue was rededicated on September 10, 2011, with Jean Irving, the wife of businessman James K. Irving, unveiling the statue, which had been covered with a tartan cloth.

Around 2016, work on an expansion for the Beaverbrook Art Gallery prompted the removal of the statue, which was placed in storage. In October 2018, the gallery announced that it planned to place the statue in a sculpture garden near the building that would also include a statue of Lord Beaverbrook (the gallery's namesake) and a fountain that had been donated by Beaverbrook to the city. The cost of placing the three pieces of sculpture would cost a total of $200,000 ($246,000 in 2025), which would be split equally by the gallery and the city government. Per the city government's website, the statue has an address of 799 Queen Street.

== Urban legend ==
In a 1994 book, author Colleen Thompson recounted an urban legend that she said was popular in Fredericton. According to the legend, Fredericton's St. Andrew's Society had first proposed the idea of erecting a statue of Burns in 1825, with plans to place the statue on the lawn of Christ Church Cathedral. Bishop John Medley of the Diocese of Fredericton, under a misunderstanding that the society wanted to erect a statue of William Shakespeare, initially supported the idea. However, after realizing that the statue would be of Burns instead of Shakespeare, he changed his mind. While later church officials compromised and allowed the statue to be placed on the Green next to the cathedral, the individuals erecting the monument placed Burns so that he was facing slightly away from the church building.

== See also ==
- List of public art in Fredericton
- List of Robert Burns memorials
- Robert Burns Memorial (Denver) – Another statue of Robert Burns designed by William Grant Stevenson
- Statue of Robert Burns (Milwaukee) – Another statue of Robert Burns designed by William Grant Stevenson
