= Thomas Temple Fountain =

Public work of art in New Brunswick, Canada

Coordinates: 45.960181°N 66.63629°W

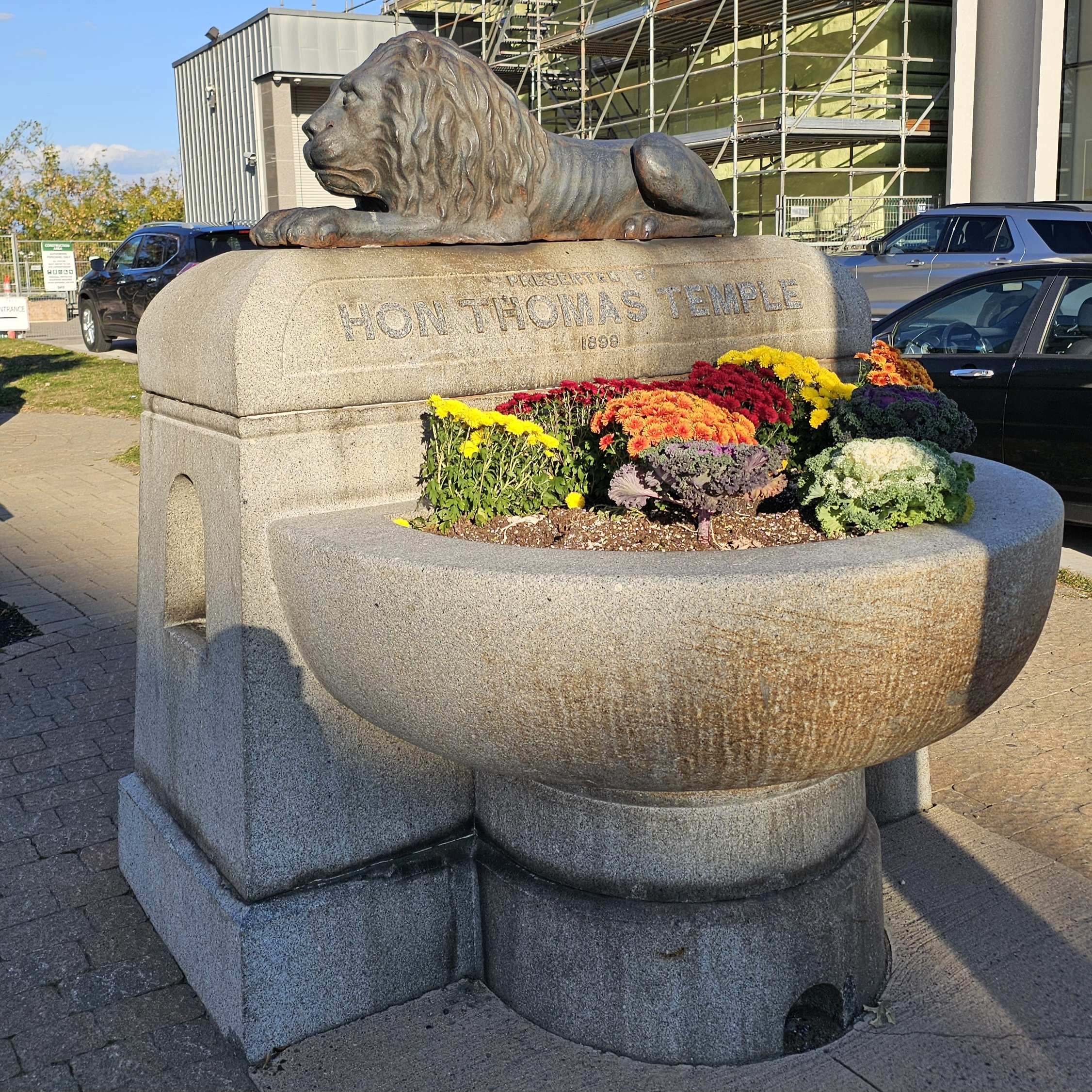
The Thomas Temple Fountain in 2025

The Thomas Temple Fountain was a cast-iron and granite drinking fountain for "man and beast" in Fredericton, New Brunswick, Canada. It no longer functions as a fountain but remains in place as a work of public art. It is located at the north end of Queen Street, just west of the Beaverbrook Art Gallery. The Temple Fountain was added to Fredericton's Local Historic Places Register in June 2011.

Senator Thomas Temple presented the fountain to the city in 1899 for the use of horses, dogs and humans. The upper trough, now used as a flower planter during summer, provided water for horses, while dogs used a cast-iron bowl at the fountain's base. People drank from cups chained in the niches on either side of the structure.

Senator Temple bought the fountain's cast-iron elements in Ottawa, and the granite was quarried and carved in New Brunswick. The stone came from a quarry on Spoon Island in the Saint John River near Hampstead, and the firm of Tayte, Meating & Co. in Saint George built the fountain.

== See also ==
- List of public art in Fredericton
