= Thomas Temple (Canadian politician) =

Canadian politician

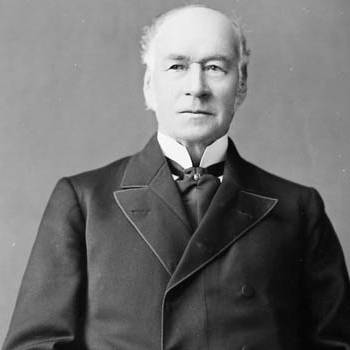
Thomas Temple Source: Library and Archives Canada

Thomas Temple (November 4, 1818 – August 25, 1899) was a farmer, lumberman, businessman and political figure in Fredericton, New Brunswick, Canada.

He was born in Bampton, Oxfordshire, England, the son of Charles Temple and his wife Hannah Spiers, and was educated in England. Temple came to New Brunswick in 1832 and served with the York Light Dragoons in the Aroostook War of 1838. He married Susannah Howe of Southampton, New Brunswick in 1842. Temple served as high sheriff for York County from 1864 to 1883. In 1868 he became president of the Fredericton Railway Company, which had been incorporated in 1866 in order to extend the line from Fredericton to the Western Extension of the European and North American Railway. He retained that position until at least 1897. He was also managing director of the Fredericton and St. Mary's Railway Bridge Company, which was incorporated in 1885, and a director of the People's Bank of Fredericton and the Saint John Safety Fund Insurance Company.

Temple was elected to the House of Commons of Canada in an 1884 by-election held after the death of John Pickard. He was re-elected in the 1887 and 1891 general elections, and represented York in the House of Commons from 1884 to 1896 as a Conservative member. Temple went on to represent York division in the Senate of Canada from 1896 to 1899.

He died in office at the age of 80, having served over 15 years in the House of Commons and Senate. Shortly before his death he presented the city of Fredericton with a granite drinking fountain which became known as the Thomas Temple Fountain. His last public act as a Senator was to turn on the water at the fountain's unveiling ceremony in August 1899.
