= The Beavers =

Limestone sculpture in Fredericton

- The Two Beavers
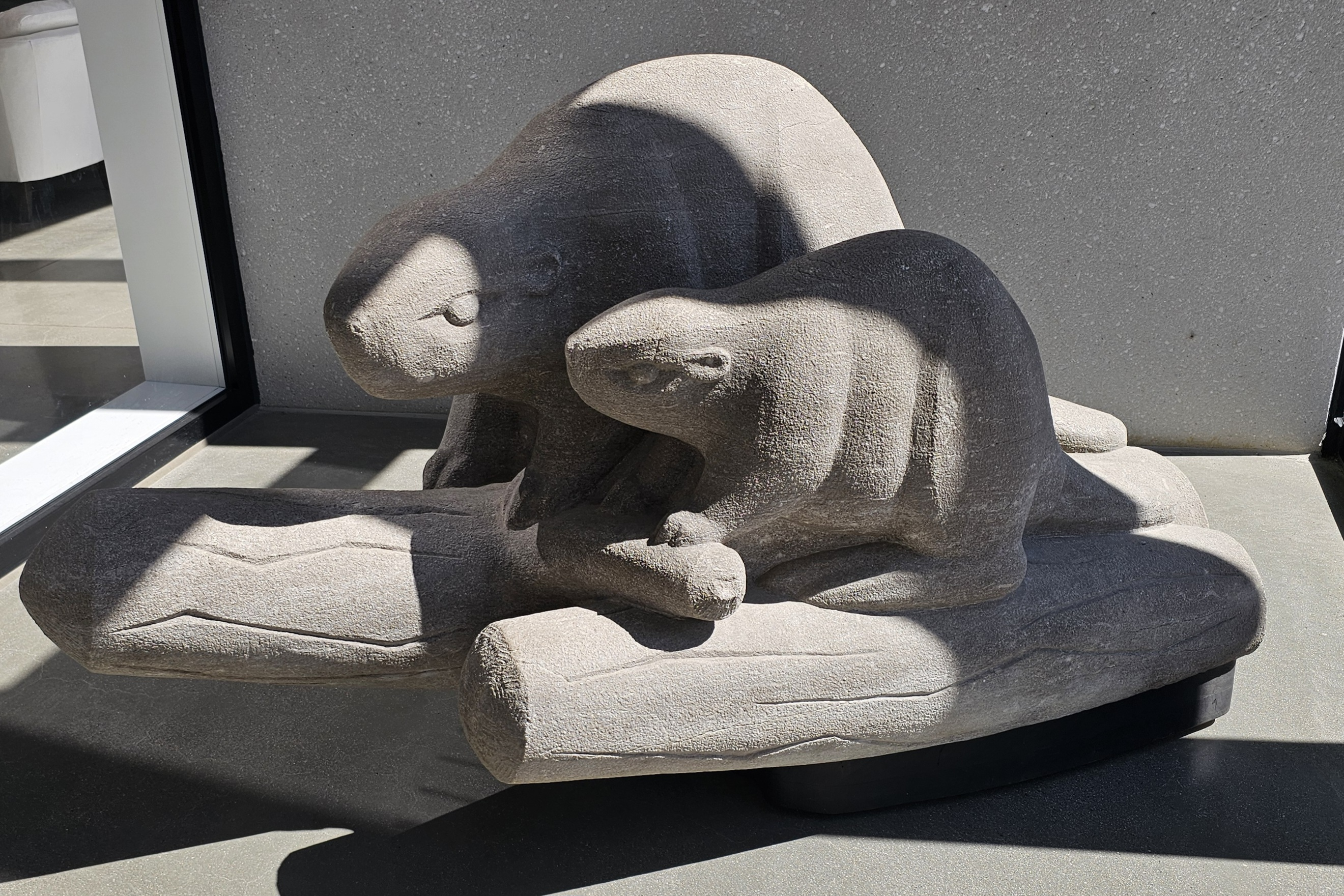
- The sculpture in 2026
- Artist: Claude Roussel
- Year: 1959
- Medium: Limestone
- Subject: Beavers
- Dimensions: 76 cm × 76 cm × 150 cm (30 in × 30 in × 60 in)
- Weight: 3,000 pounds (1,400 kg)
- Location: Beaverbrook Art Gallery, Fredericton; 45°57′35″N 66°38′8″W

The Beavers (also known as The Two Beavers) is a 1959 sculpture by Claude Roussel. It is made of limestone and depicts two beavers perched on a log. The piece was commissioned by the government of New Brunswick as a gift for Max Aitken, 1st Baron Beaverbrook, to celebrate his 80th birthday. The sculpture was originally installed in Officers' Square in the provincial capital city of Fredericton. However, in 2016 it was moved into storage as part of a renovation of the square. In 2024, it underwent a restoration and was relocated to the city's Beaverbrook Art Gallery.

== Description ==
The sculpture is made of limestone and depicts two beavers—a mother and a child—perched on a log. The sculpture, which weighs approximately 3,000 pounds (1,400 kilograms), has a length of 60 inches (150 centimetres) and width and height measurements of 30 in (76 cm).

== History ==
=== Creation and unveiling ===
The sculpture was commissioned by the provincial government of New Brunswick in 1959 as a gift for Max Aitken, 1st Baron Beaverbrook, in celebration of his 80th birthday. Beaverbrook was a businessman, philanthropist, and politician from New Brunswick whose actions in the provincial capital of Fredericton included serving as chancellor for the University of New Brunswick and funding the creation of the Beaverbrook Art Gallery. For the work, the province hired Claude Roussel, an Acadian artist from New Brunswick. The sculpture would be Roussel's first major work produced in stone. He carved it in his basement in Edmundston. According to a 1984 article in Atlantic Insight, the project served as "something of a fountainhead" for Roussel. Beaverbrook helped him to become an assistant curator at the Beaverbrook Art Gallery, serving in that position at the gallery's opening in 1959.

The sculpture was unveiled in 1959 and was originally installed outdoors in Officers' Square, next to a bronze statue of Lord Beaverbrook that had been designed by sculptor Vincent Apap. It was positioned as the cynosure for a small body of water, though this wading pool was removed in the 1990s. Despite the pool's removal, the sculpture remained fixed to a concrete pedestal in the square.

=== Restoration and relocation ===
In 2016, when the city began to work on a renovation of Officers' Square, the sculpture was moved into storage. This move was partially to prevent further damage to the sculpture, as it had become weathered due to several decades of exposure to the elements. Additional damage had been caused by children who climbed on the sculpture. Issues with the sculpture at the time included several large cracks, vegetation growing on its surface, and damage to the eyes and ears of the smaller beaver.

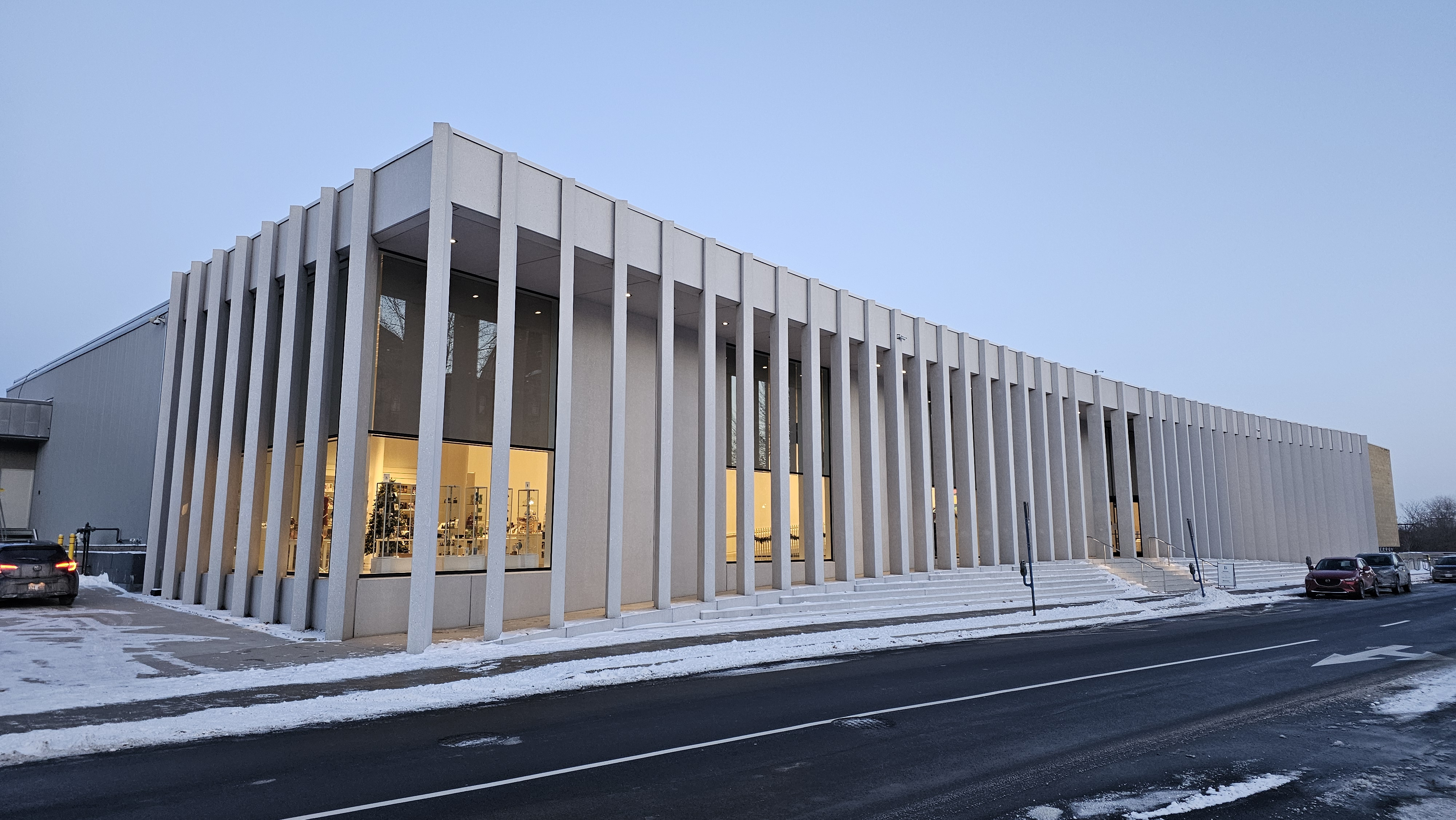
In 2024, the sculpture was relocated to the Beaverbrook Art Gallery (pictured 2025).

In 2023, the government of Fredericton hired a conservator to assess the sculpture, who recommended making repairs to the cracks and relocating the sculpture indoors. The restoration, a joint collaboration between the city government and the Beaverbrook Art Gallery, commenced in mid-2024 and took about two weeks to complete. Additionally, after reviewing several possible locations, the city government recommended placing the sculpture inside the art gallery, with Roussel also supporting the relocation. At that time, the gallery owned several of Roussel's works, including a maquette of the beaver sculpture made of plaster that had been produced during his work on the project. The work was unveiled at the gallery on November 23, 2024. It was positioned in the gallery's entryway, in an area where it would be visible from both the inside and outside of the museum.

== Reception ==
The sculpture has been largely well-received and is considered a symbol of the city. Discussing the significance of the sculpture in 2024, Fredericton Mayor Kate Rogers called the piece "a strong representation of Fredericton's history" and "a piece of New Brunswick history". Around the same time, Bernard Doucet, the executive director of the Beaverbrook Art Gallery, called the work "a cherished part of Fredericton's history and a beautiful testament to the immense talent of Acadian artists", a sentiment echoed in a description of the work given by the gallery's website.

== See also ==
- 1959 in art
- List of public art in Fredericton
