= The Fountain of Indolence =

Painting by J. M. W. Turner

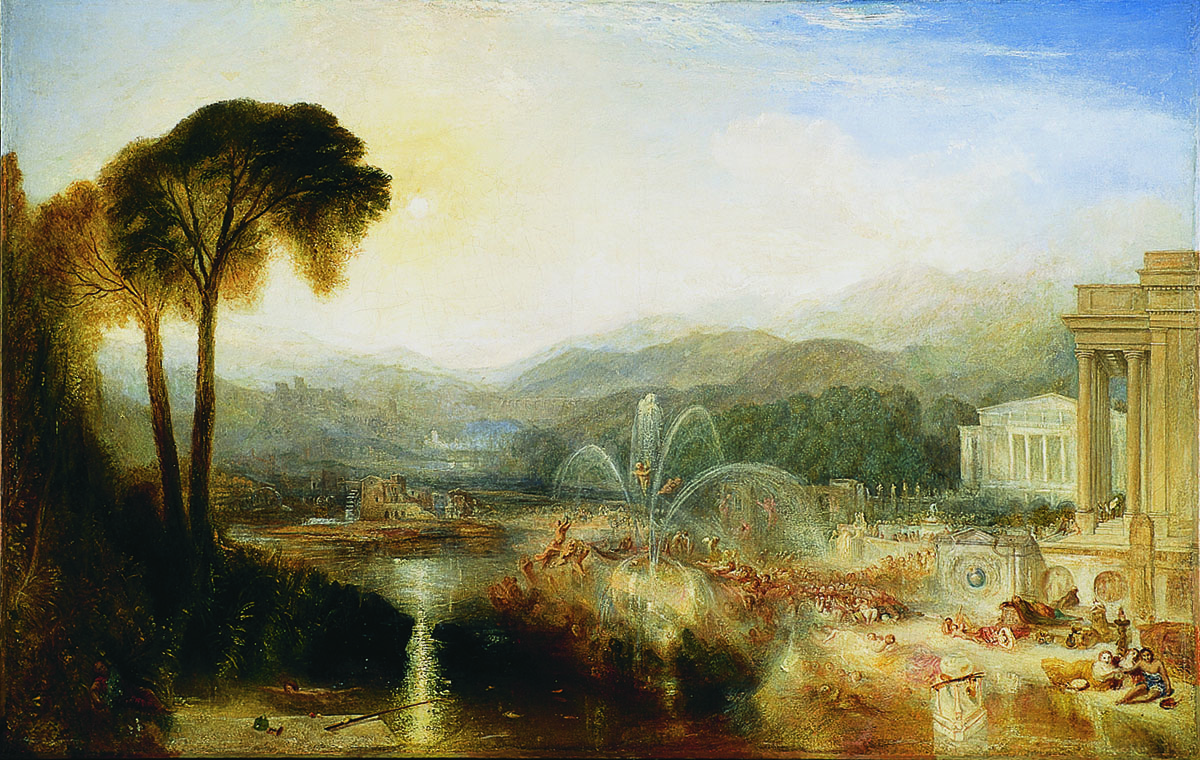
- Artist: J. M. W. Turner
- Year: 1834
- Medium: Oil on canvas
- Dimensions: 106.5 cm × 166.4 cm (41.9 in × 65.5 in)
- Location: Beaverbrook Art Gallery, Fredericton
- Accession: 1959.259

The Fountain of Indolence is an oil painting by the English artist J. M. W. Turner. First exhibited in 1834, it is now in the collection of the Beaverbrook Art Gallery in Fredericton, New Brunswick, Canada.

== Subject ==
The painting depicts a scene described in Canto 1 of James Thomson's 1748 poem The Castle of Indolence.

Thus easy-rob'd, they to the fountain sped
That in the middle of the court up-threw
A stream, high spouting from its liquid bed,
And falling back again in drizzly dew;
There each deep draughts, as deep he thirsted drew;
It was a fountain of nepenthe rare;
Whence, as Dan Homer sings, huge pleasaunce grew,
And sweet oblivion of vile earthly care;
Fair gladsome waking thoughts, and joyous dreams more fair.

It shows an imaginary landscape with Classical buildings and ruins centred on the fountain, around and within which human and winged Cupid-like figures are grouped.

== History ==
The Fountain of Indolence was first exhibited at the 66th Royal Academy Exhibition at Somerset House in May 1834, to a generally favourable reception. The subsequent history of the painting is unknown until 1882, when it was sold to Thomas Agnew & Sons by H. Lumley. William Henry Vanderbilt then purchased it from Agnew and it remained in the Vanderbilt family until 1958. George W. Vanderbilt loaned it to the Metropolitan Museum of Art for an exhibition of British paintings in 1907.

In 1958 Lord Beaverbrook was actively seeking a "first-rate" Turner painting for the Beaverbrook Art Gallery, which was to open the following year in Fredericton. He purchased The Fountain of Indolence from the dealers Leggatt Brothers of London. The painting became central to a dispute that developed in 2004 between the Gallery and the Beaverbrook UK Foundation, which claimed ownership of 133 paintings that had been acquired by Lord Beaverbrook for the Gallery. The Foundation proposed to take back and sell The Fountain of Indolence, which Sotheby's had valued in 2002 at between $16.7 and $25 million in Canadian funds. The Gallery denied that the Foundation owned the paintings, maintaining that they all belonged to the Gallery. Both sides agreed to submit to arbitration, which resulted in a 2007 ruling that 85 of the paintings, including The Fountain of Indolence, belonged to the Gallery, while the remaining 48 belonged to the Foundation. The Foundation appealed the ruling, but it was confirmed by an appeal panel in 2009.

== The Fountain of Fallacy ==
The gap in the provenance of The Fountain of Indolence between 1834 and 1882 lends credence to the theory that it is identical with The Fountain of Fallacy, a painting which Turner exhibited at the British Institution in 1839, accompanied by four lines from his own poem entitled Fallacies of Hope.

Its Rainbow-dew diffused fell on each anxious lip,
Working wild fantasy, imagining;
First, Science in the immeasurable Abyss of thought,
Measured her orbit slumbering.

Contemporary descriptions of the Fountain of Fallacy apply equally well to The Fountain of Indolence. In 1839, the year it was exhibited, Turner wrote to a Mr. Marshall that The Fountain of Fallacy was for sale for 400 guineas and that he had no other painting of that size for sale. No subsequent ownership history of The Fountain of Fallacy is known and the only recorded references to it after its first exhibition are two comments by John Ruskin. According to Turner expert Martin Butlin, in the catalogue raisonné The Paintings of J.M.W. Turner, the available evidence indicates "that in fact there was – and is – only one" picture.

== See also ==
- List of paintings by J. M. W. Turner
