= Claude Roussel =

Canadian sculptor (1930–2025)

Claude Roussel CM ONB
- Born: July 6, 1930; Edmundston, New Brunswick, Canada
- Died: May 28, 2025 (aged 94); Moncton, New Brunswick, Canada
- Education: École des beaux-arts de Montréal
- Occupation: Sculptor; painter; educator
- Years active: 1959–1992
- Awards: See list
- Website: www.clauderoussel.ca

Claude P. Roussel CM ONB (July 6, 1930 – May 28, 2025) was a Canadian sculptor, painter and educator. He is considered a pioneer of Acadian modern art.

== Early life and education ==
Roussel was born on July 6, 1930, in Edmundston, New Brunswick, Canada. He was 10 years old when he began sculpting wood. At the age of 14, Roussel's artistic possibilities were discovered by Paul Carmel Laporte when Roussel showed him a plaque entitled Trout (1944), an artwork created using only a file and his own intuitive knowledge. With Laporte's mentorship, Roussel advanced his wood carving techniques, and showed his early works at his first solo exhibition in 1947, at the age of 17, the year he completed his high school studies in Edmundston.

From 1950 to 1956, he studied under the tutelage of art professors at the École des beaux-arts de Montréal in Quebec, Canada, where he graduated with a diploma in drawing professorship in 1955, and a diploma in sculpture in 1956. During his studies, Quebec's artistic revolutions of Refus Global and Les Automatistes played an influence on Roussel, who not only admired them but practised their expressive forms of art within his own work, and implemented the use of bold colours and abstract forms. In 1961, Roussel was awarded a Senior Fellowship from the Canada Council for the Arts to study Europe's important art, especially architectural decorations in England, France, Italy, and Spain.

== Career ==
After completing his studies, Roussel returned to his hometown where he became the first professional artist to teach education through art in the public school system of the province of New Brunswick. From 1959 to 1961, Roussel was employed at the Beaverbrook Art Gallery in Fredericton as the first Francophone occupying a curatorial position. During the public announcement of his appointment, Lord Beaverbrook stated "I think young Roussel will give the gallery a major liaison with the Acadian culture of this area and at the same time impart to our French Canadian artists a real sense of belonging".

In 1963, at the invitation of Clément Cormier, vice chancellor and founder of Université de Moncton, New Brunswick, and with a special grant from Canada Council for the Arts, Roussel became the first Artist-in-residence given the responsibility to develop the visual arts curriculum. He was the founding director of the university's Visual Arts Department and occupied the position from 1963 to 1971, and again from 1976 to 1979. He was also the founding director of the university's Art Gallery, from 1964 to 1967, during which he organized in 1964 an exhibition of Canadian masters – Borduas, Pellan, Riopelle and Dumouchel – and the first two major exhibitions of works by Acadian artists, Selection 65 and Selection 67. He retired from his position as professor in 1992 after a tenure of 29 years.

Roussel was a member of the Maritime Education Foundation and the Jack Chambers Memorial Foundation. He was chair of Louise-et-Reuben-Cohen Acquisition Fund for the Art Gallery of the University of Moncton until 1991. From 1971 to 1976, he was the founding president of Canadian Artists Representation (CARFAC) representing New Brunswick.

== Later life and death ==
In February 1992, Roussel retired to Cap-Pelé, where he worked full time as an artist. He died in Moncton on May 28, 2025, at the age of 94.

== Notable artwork ==
Roussel's work has been exhibited at more than 200 solo and group shows in Canada and internationally. His artworks are found in many countries but especially in Canada's eastern provinces. Roussel created more than 60 monumental and public art sculptures, some of which are listed below.

- The Beavers, 1959, limestone, Officer's Square, Fredericton, New Brunswick (presented to Lord Beaverbrook by the Government of New Brunswick on the occasion of his 80th birthday)
- Escuminac Disaster Monument, 1959–1969, limestone, Escuminac Disaster Monument Provincial Historic Site, New Brunswick
- Fishermen's Monument (1968), soldered iron rods, Blacks Harbour, New Brunswick post office
- Éros, 1971, welded Corten steel, Université de Moncton, Moncton, New Brunswick
- Progression, 1972, fiberglass, Saint John City Hall
- Atlantic, 1976, steel and epoxy, Summer Olympic Games XXI, City of Kingston, Ontario
- Brûlez et détruisez tout, 1986, polyester paste, Grand-Pré National Historic Site, Nova Scotia
- Dina Bolts, 1988, XXIV Summer Olympic Sculpture Garden, Seoul, South Korea
- Monument Père Clément-Cormier, 1990, bronze casting, Université de Moncton, Moncton, New Brunswick
- Moncton 100 Monument, 1990, bronze, steel and granite, Moncton, New Brunswick
- Transition 2000, 1999, welded brass and copper, UNI Financial Cooperation, Moncton, New Brunswick
- Monument Mère Marie Léonie, 2004, bronze casting, Memramcook, New Brunswick
- Inspire-Action, 2017, welded steel, City of Dieppe, New Brunswick

== Gallery ==
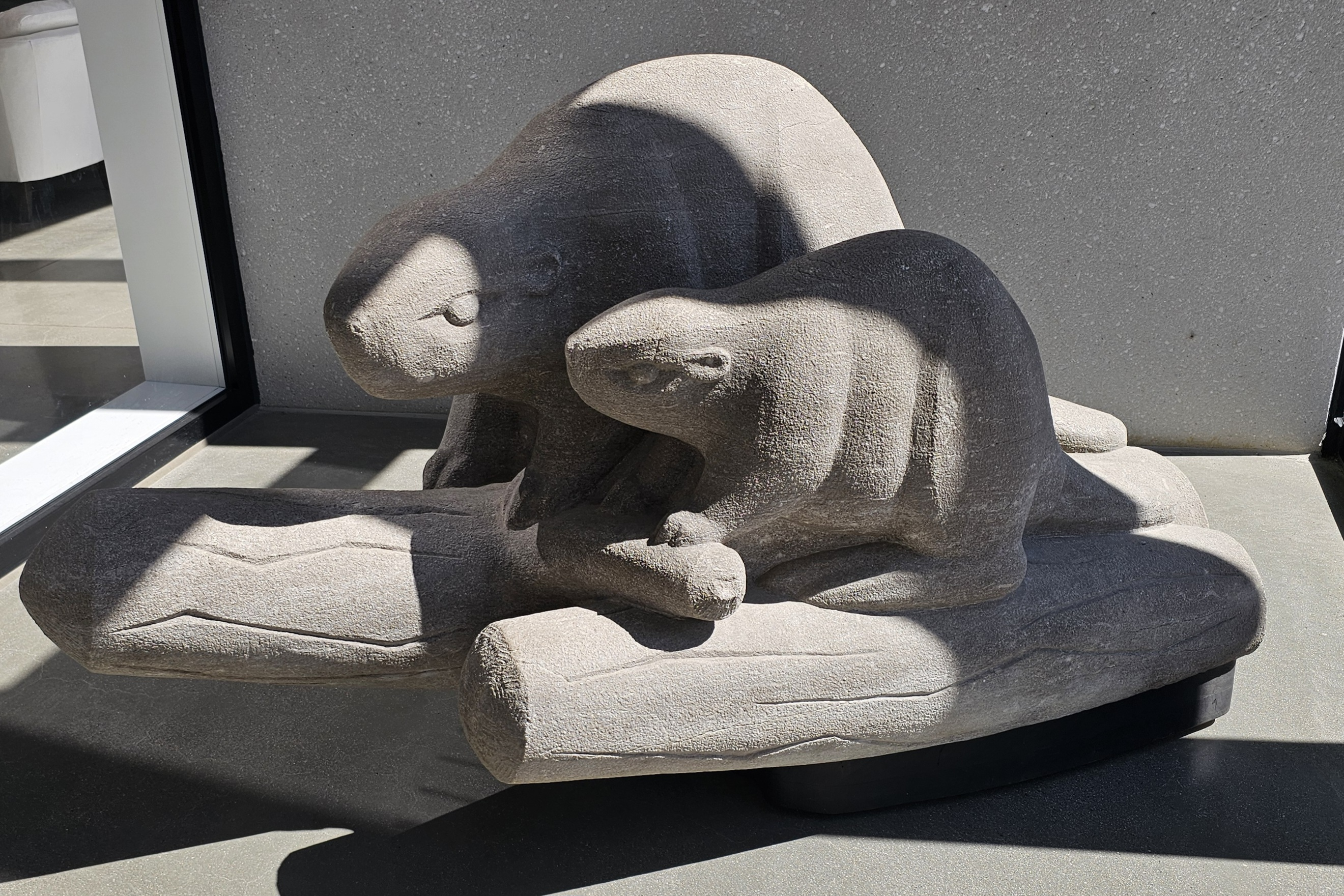
The Beavers, 1959

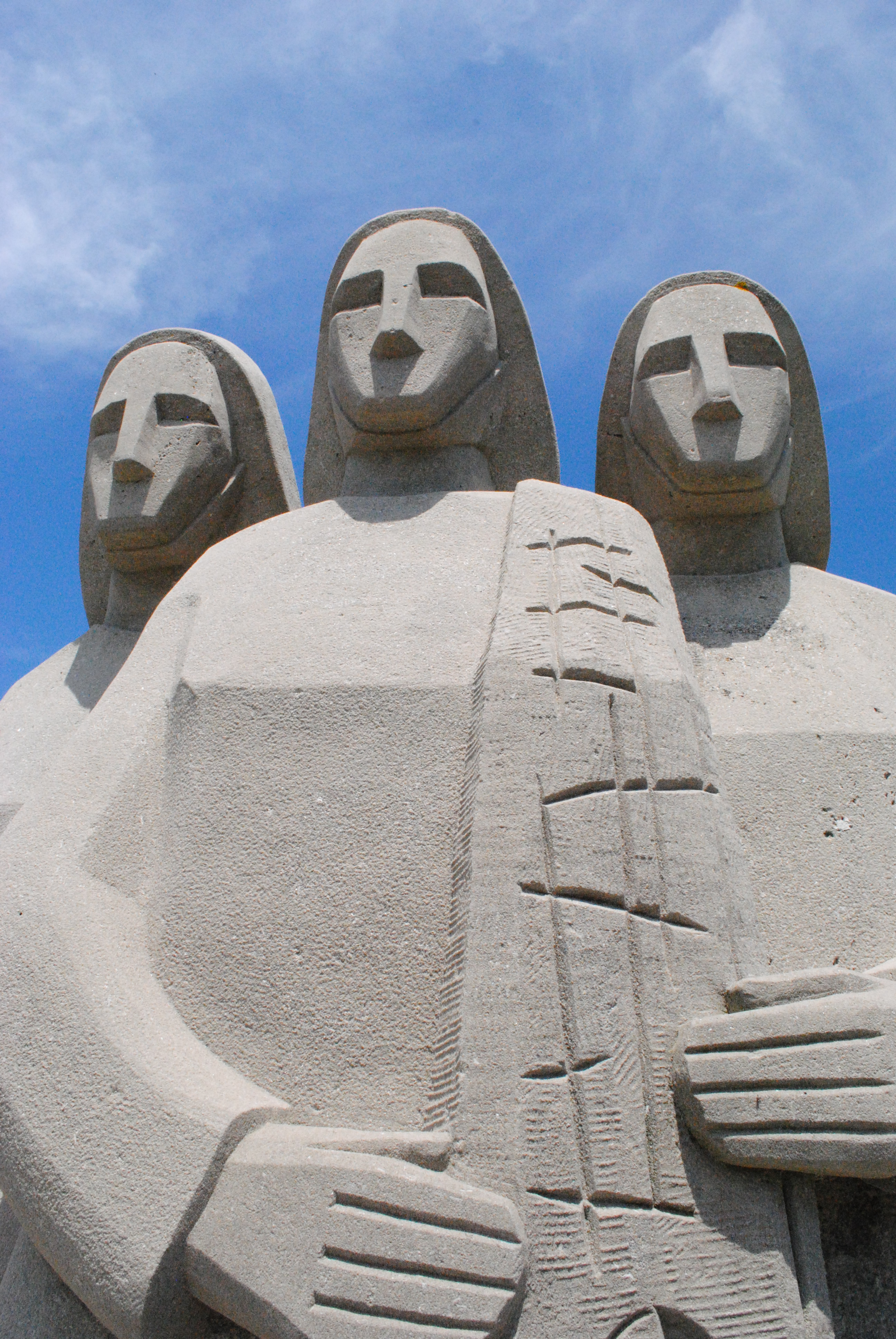
Escuminac Disaster Monument, 1959–1969 (close-up)

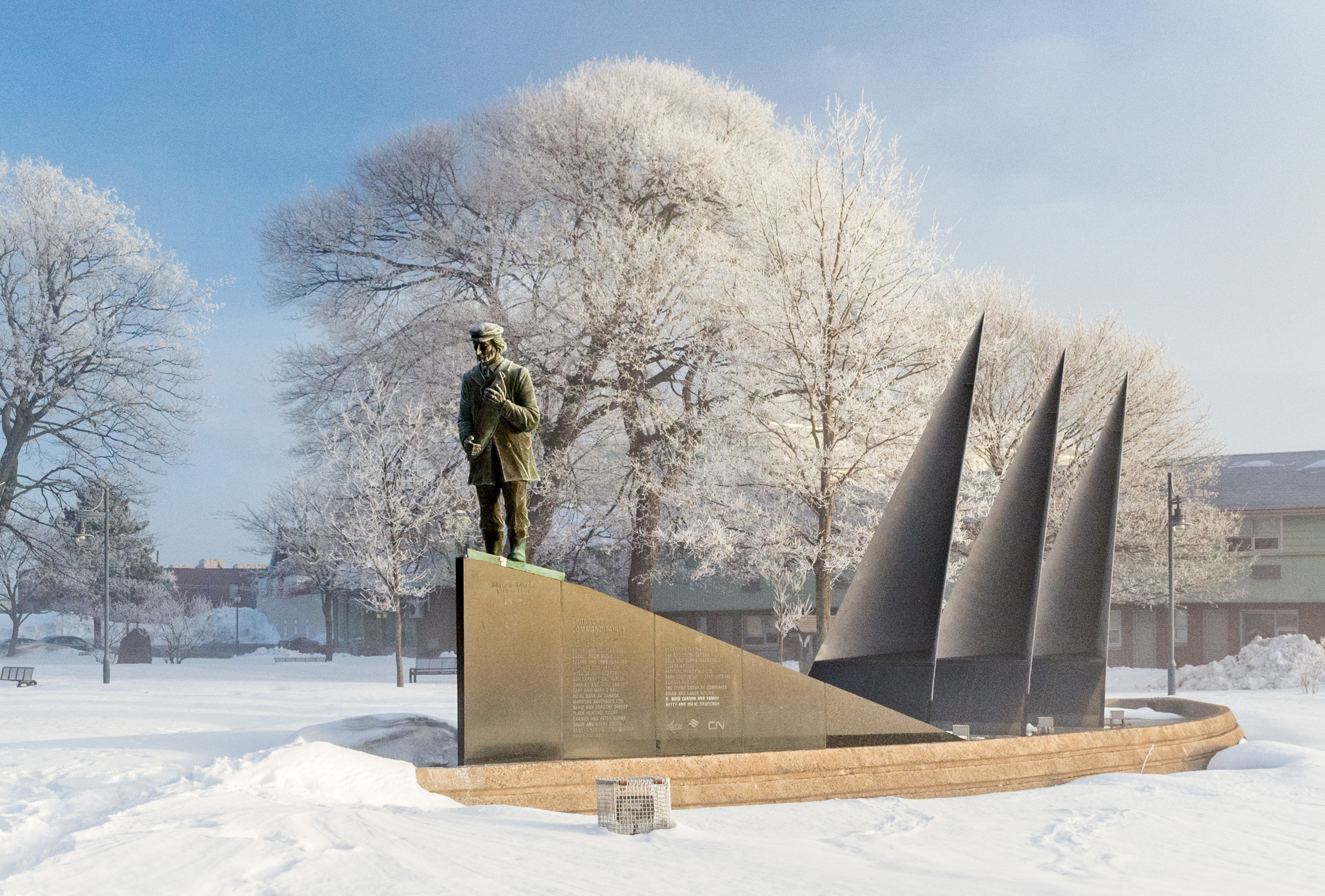
Moncton 100 Monument, 1990

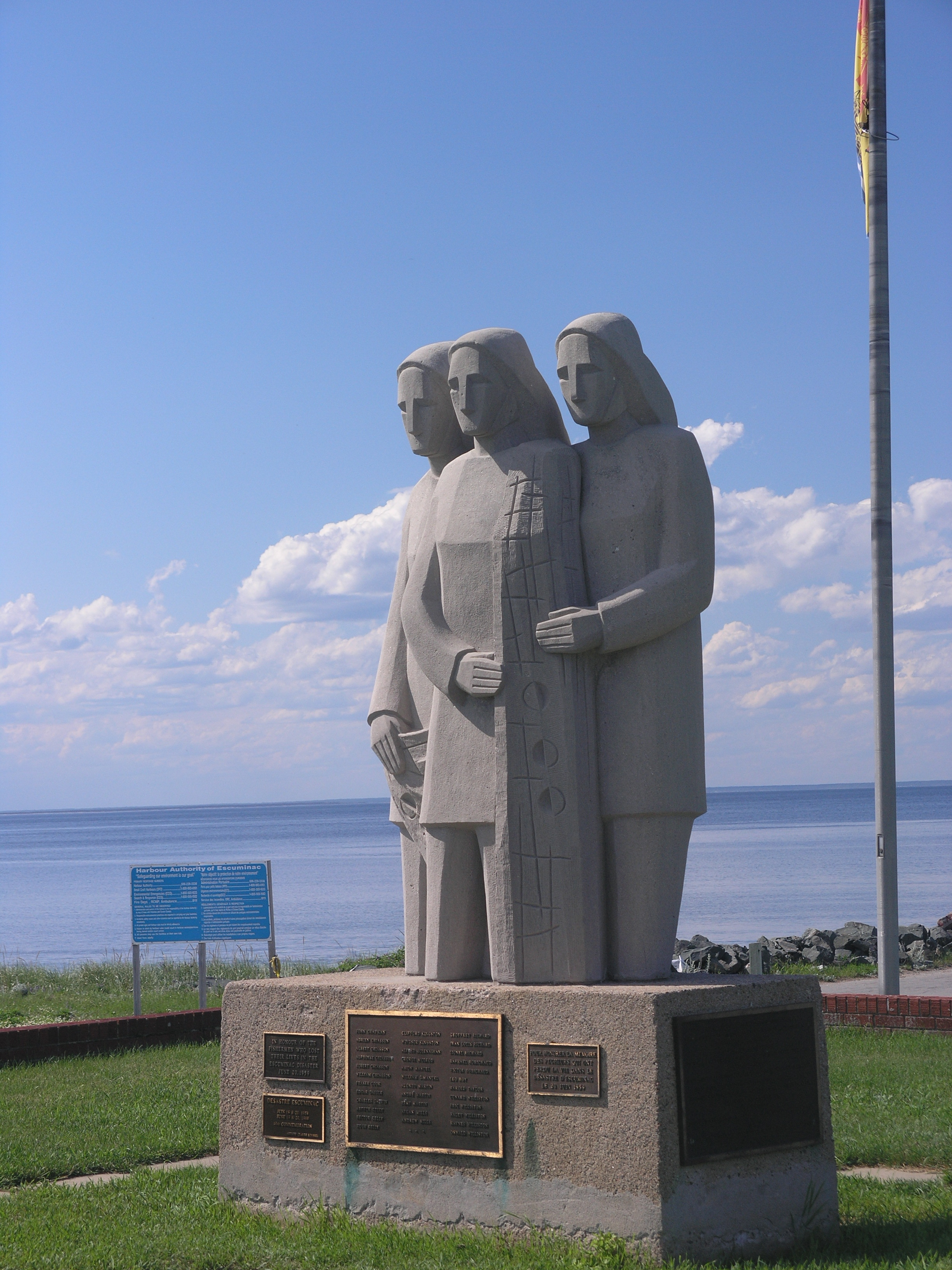
Escuminac Disaster Monument, 1959–1969

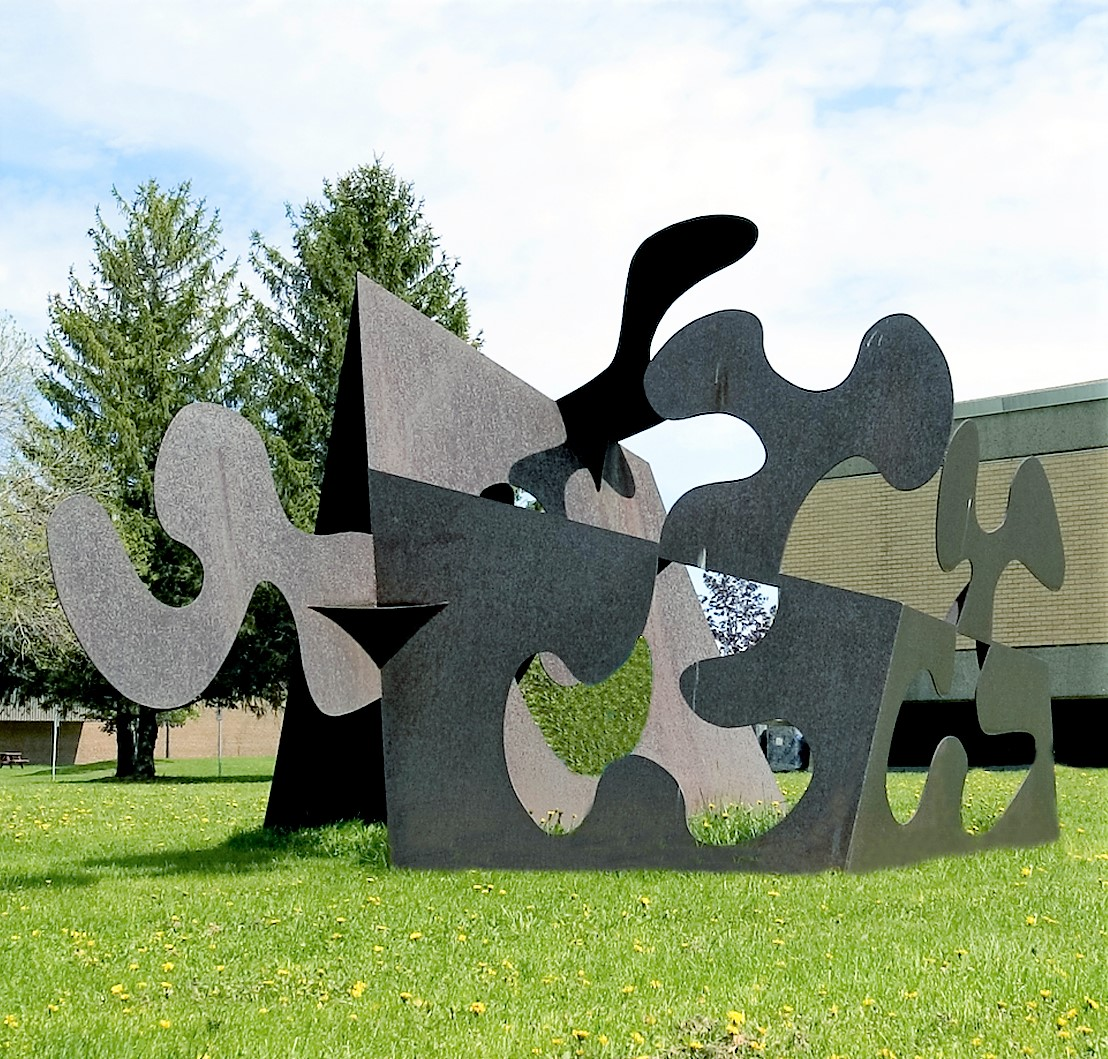
Éros, 1971

== Awards and honours ==
- 1964: Allied Arts Medal of the Royal Architectural Institute of Canada
- 1967: Centennial Medal
- 1972: Knight of the Order of La Pléiade
- 1976: Symposium Olympique
- 1977: Queen Elizabeth II Silver Jubilee Medal
- 1982: Medal of the Order of the Pléiade
- 1984: Order of Canada
- 1989: First Prize of the Marion McCain exhibit, Beaverbrook Art Gallery, Fredericton
- 1992: 125th Anniversary of the Confederation of Canada Medal
- 2002: Order of New Brunswick
- 2005: Lieutenant-Governor's Award for High Achievement in the Arts
- Member of the Royal Canadian Academy of Arts
