= Beaverbrook Art Gallery =

Art museum in Fredericton, New Brunswick, Canada

Coordinates: 45.9598°N 66.6356°W

- Musée des beaux-arts Beaverbrook

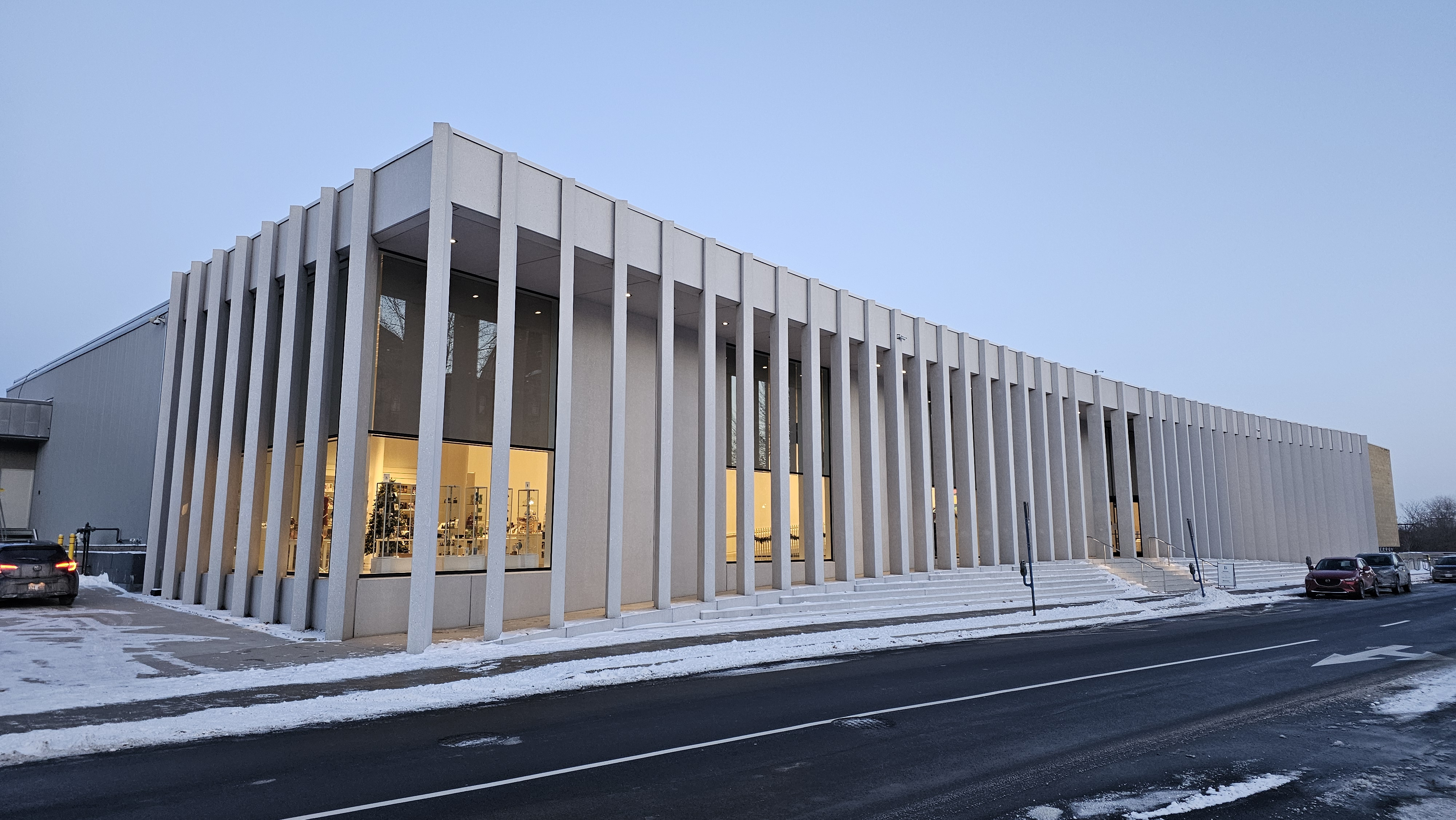
- The museum in 2025
- Established: 1959
- Location: 703 Queen Street; Fredericton, New Brunswick, Canada
- Type: Art museum
- Collection size: 6,000 works (2018)
- Visitors: 38,960 (2018)
- Founder: William Maxwell "Max" Aitken, 1st Baron Beaverbrook
- Director: Bernard Doucet (2024)
- Public transit access: 16N Marysville (Fredericton Transit)
- Parking: Queen Street, East End Parking Garage
- Website: beaverbrookartgallery.org

The Beaverbrook Art Gallery (French: Musée des beaux-arts Beaverbrook) commonly referred to simply as The Beaverbrook, is a public art gallery in Fredericton, New Brunswick, Canada. It is named after William Maxwell "Max" Aitken, Lord Beaverbrook, who funded the building of the gallery and assembled the original collection. It opened in 1959 with over 300 works, including paintings by J. M. W. Turner and Salvador Dalí. The Beaverbrook Art Gallery is New Brunswick's officially designated provincial art gallery.

The building has undergone several expansions, the latest of which opened in 2017 via a design by Halifax-based MacKay-Lyons Sweetapple Architects. Former director Terry Graff stated that this "expansion and revitalization" aimed to make the gallery "an important destination for national and international contemporary art".

== Building ==
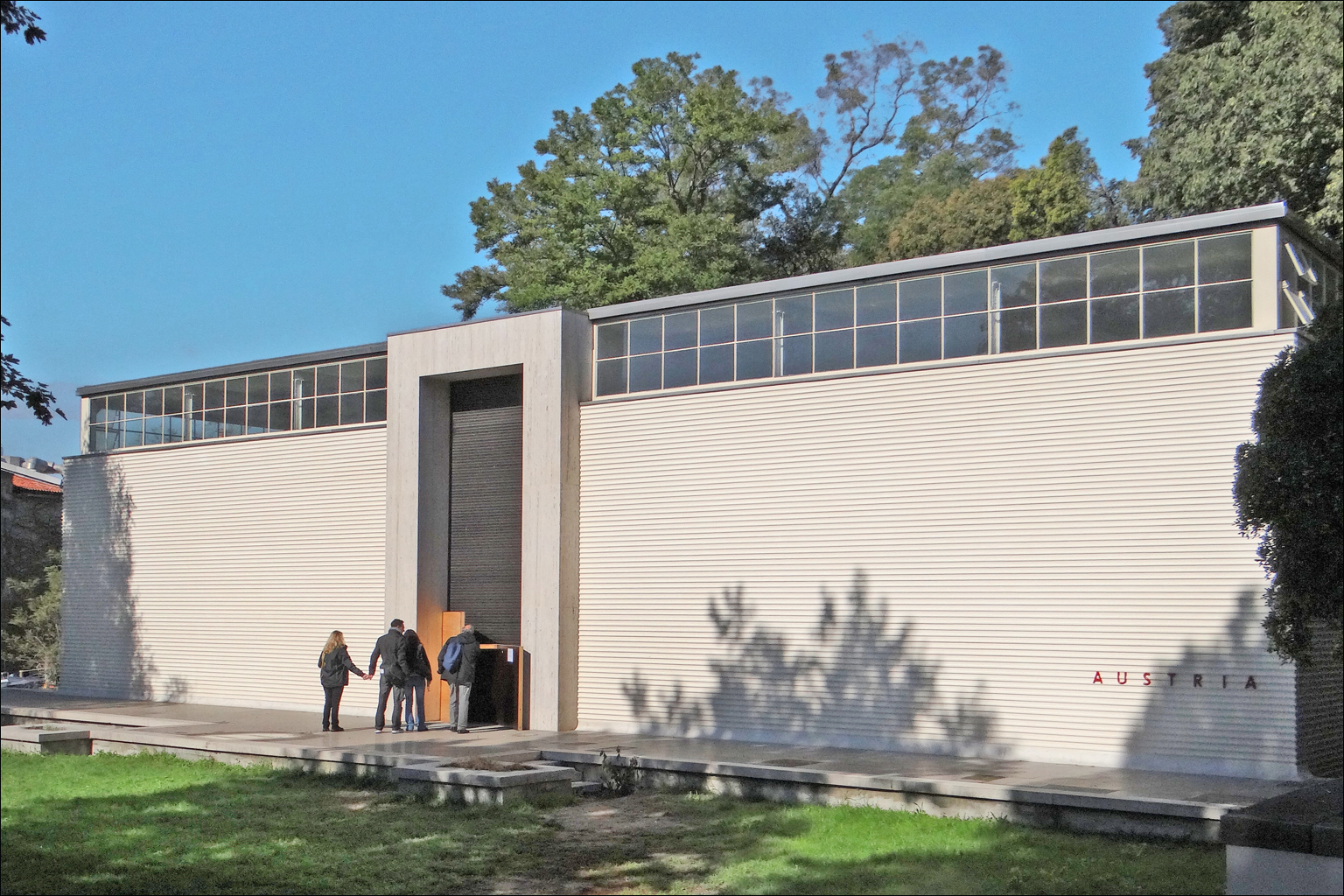
The simplified Classical symmetry of the building echoes such earlier works as Josef Hoffman's Austrian Pavilion (shown above), built for the 1934 Venice Biennale

In 1954 Lord Beaverbrook made an offer to Hugh John Flemming, the Premier of New Brunswick, to build and stock an art gallery in Fredericton. The Province accepted the proposal, and provided him with a site directly across from the New Brunswick Legislative Building on the southern bank of the Saint John River. Neil Stewart, of the Fredericton architectural firm Howell & Stewart, designed the mid-century modern building as a flat-roofed single-storey structure, faced with pale semi-glazed brick. It has a granite base, with cornices and a frieze of white marble quarried at Philipsburg, Quebec. The original exhibition space consisted of a high-ceilinged central gallery with a square gallery on either side.

In 1983, the building was expanded with the addition of east and west wings. These additions, funded by Marguerite Vaughan and the Beaverbrook Canadian Foundation respectively, housed the Hosmer Pillow Vaughan collection of china and other decorative arts, and the Sir Max Aitken Gallery. In 1995, another expansion, housing the Marion McCain Atlantic Gallery, was opened. Its name honours the late wife of New Brunswick businessman Harrison McCain, who contributed $1 million to the project.

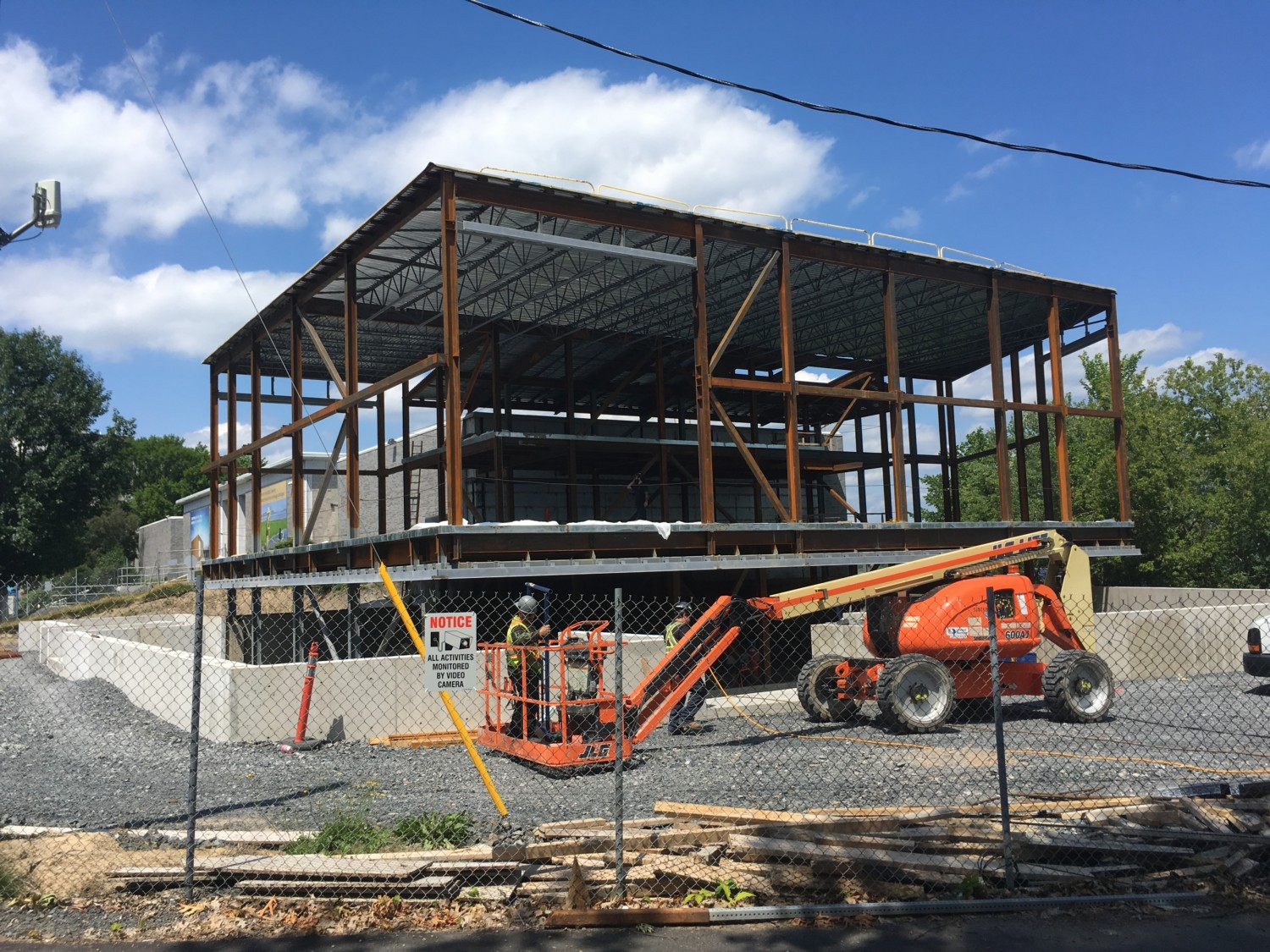
Work on the expansion for the Beaverbrook Art Gallery, July 2016.

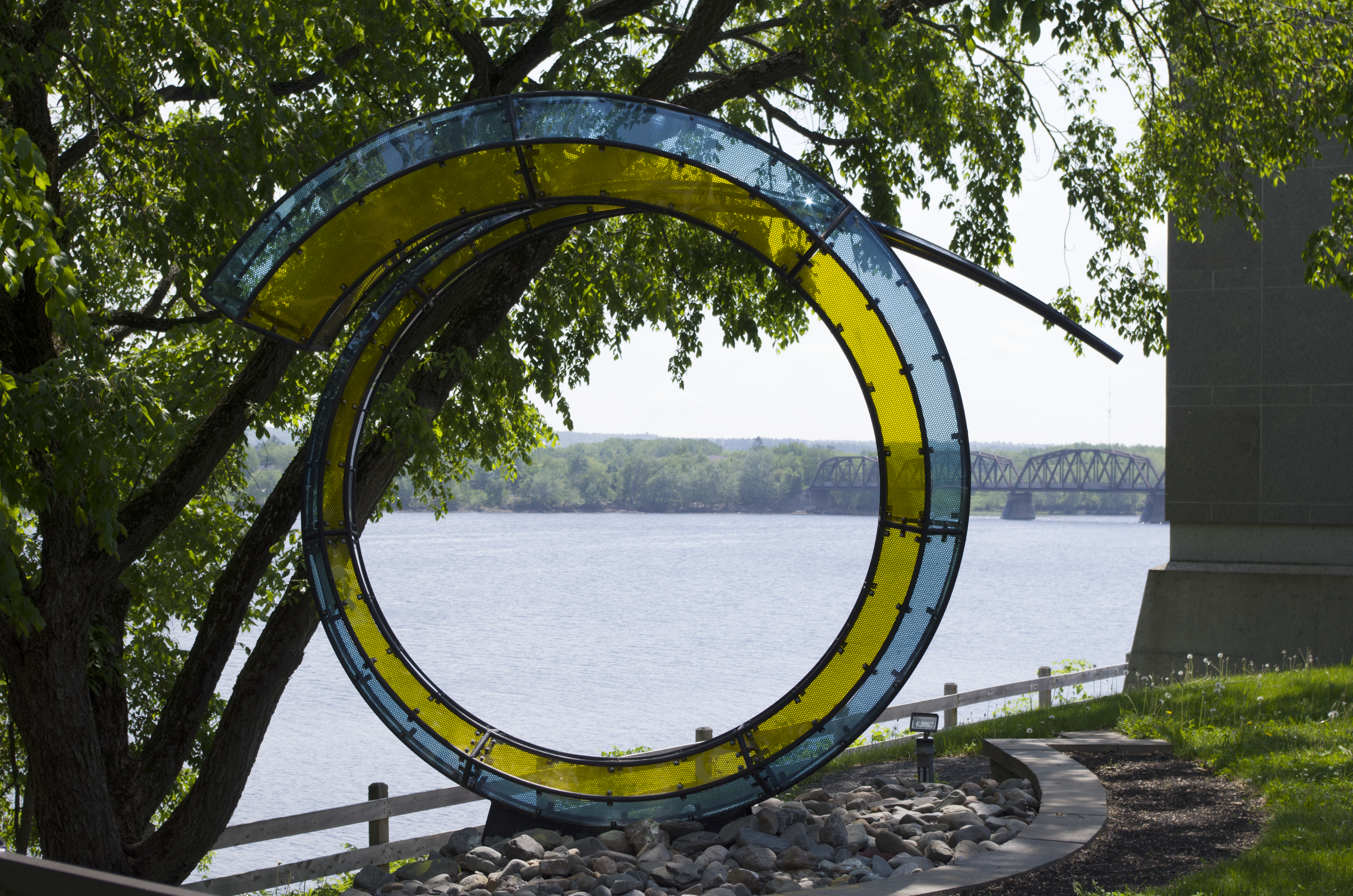
The sculpture Arriving Home, by Dennis Oppenheim, situated at the TD Sculpture Garden.

On 20 May 2015, the Beaverbrook Art Gallery unveiled plans for a large expansion project following a 6-year $25 million fundraising campaign. The expansion includes a substantial increase to gallery space, an artist-in-residence studio, a learning theatre, a café, and an outdoor sculpture courtyard. It also features new mobility access features, including an elevator and ramps. Construction of the new pavilion began in October 2015. On 20 July 2016, the Gallery announced that it was increasing its fundraising goal from $25 million to $28 million after an outpouring of generosity from private donors and government sources. The increased capital will allow for more amenities, as well as increased programming and more. Construction of the new pavilion was completed in October 2017, making the Beaverbrook Art Gallery the largest art gallery in the Atlantic region.

=== Surrounding grounds ===
In 2009, a sculpture garden was inaugurated adjacent to the Gallery. The first sculpture to be commissioned was The Birth of Venus by New Brunswick Acadian artist André Lapointe. In 2012 the Gallery received a $300,000 donation from TD Bank Group to support the initiative, which was named the TD Sculpture Garden.

A sculpture by Marie-Hélène Allain (Awakening/Éveil) has been on display on the lawns in front of the Gallery since 1985. In October 2015 the Gallery acquired the sculpture Arriving Home by American sculptor Dennis Oppenheim. The sculpture was installed permanently in the TD Sculpture Garden behind the Beaverbrook Art Gallery near the Saint John River. On September 16, 2016, the Gallery unveiled the installation of a newly acquired work by Sorel Etrog titled King and Queen.

== Permanent collection ==
=== Original collection ===
The gallery opened with a collection of more than 300 paintings, mostly British, and assembled by Lord Beaverbrook. Most of the works had been purchased by Beaverbrook himself, with the help of advisors, including Sir Alec Martin, managing director of Christie's, W.G. Constable, curator of the Boston Museum of Fine Arts, and Lady Dunn, the widow of the industrialist and art collector Sir James Dunn. Lady Dunn became Lady Beaverbrook when she married Lord Beaverbrook in 1963, a year before his death.

In 1954, Lord Beaverbrook had set up the Beaverbrook U.K. Foundation, a charitable foundation one of whose objects was "the purchasing for or providing funds for the purchase by libraries museums or art galleries in the Province [of New Brunswick]... of books manuscripts papers letters periodicals maps paintings prints statuary and other documents or works of art..." Beaverbrook gave the paintings he had already acquired to the Beaverbrook U.K. Foundation, and subsequent purchases of works for the Gallery were made by the Foundation.

According to news reports in 1959, the total value of the collection was $2,100,000 (equivalent to $22.5 million in 2025). It included works by J.M.W. Turner, John Constable, Thomas Gainsborough, Joshua Reynolds, Edwin Henry Landseer and other 18th- and 19th-century British artists. Beaverbrook had also acquired works by contemporary artists with whom he was personally acquainted, including Augustus John, William Orpen, and Graham Sutherland. Acting on the advice of Le Roux Smith Le Roux, he bought several paintings from the 1955 Daily Express Young Artists Exhibition, which Le Roux had organised. These included Lucian Freud's Hotel Bedroom, which won second prize in the exhibition.

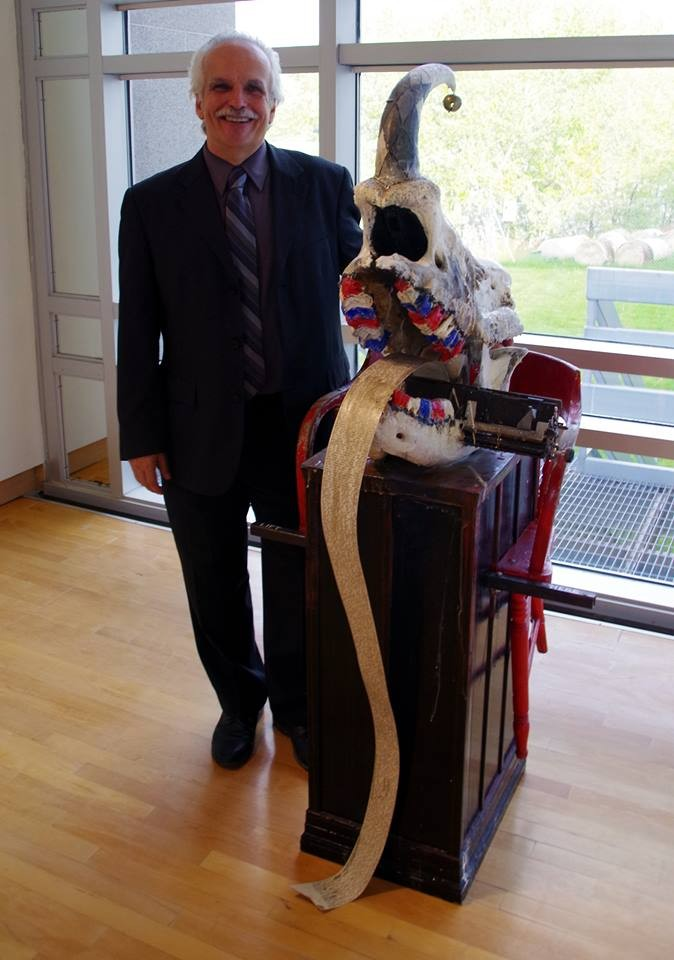
Terry Graff with Edward Kienholz sculpture the Politician With Contradictum Affixed, Also.

In addition to Lord Beaverbrook's own acquisitions, the Gallery had received two major donations of artworks before its opening. Toronto businessman James Boylen donated 22 paintings by Cornelius Krieghoff. Lady Dunn donated three portraits by Walter Sickert and three works by Salvador Dalí. Two of the Dalí paintings were portraits of Lord and Lady Dunn, while the third was the very large painting Santiago El Grande, which was on display in the central gallery when the Beaverbrook Art Gallery opened and has become closely identified with the Gallery. This painting, which measures 13 by 10 feet (400 cm × 300 cm), and represents Spain's patron saint James the Great on a white horse, had been created for the Spanish Pavilion at the 1958 Brussels World's Fair.

=== Current scope of collection ===
In the years since Lord Beaverbrook donated the original collection, the Beaverbrook Art Gallery has continued to grow its permanent collection. In 2012 there were 3600 items in the gallery's permanent collection, which is made up of four separate collection areas: the British Collection, The Canadian Collection, the International Collection, and the New Brunswick Collection. The core of the British Collection is the original Beaverbrook collection with which the gallery opened. In the Canadian Collection, the gallery hosts an extensive collection of 19th- and 20th-century Canadian artists, including many works by members of the Group of Seven, Emily Carr, David Milne and Jean-Paul Riopelle. Within the Canadian Collection, there is an emphasis on work from the Atlantic region, and the Gallery has extensive holdings of work by Christopher Pratt, Bruno Bobak, and Jack Humphrey, among others. The International Collection contains representative works from the 14th to the 20th centuries. The Hosmer Pillow Vaughan Collection of Fine and Decorative Arts forms part of the International Collection. In 1994, the Beaverbrook Art Gallery was designated the provincial art gallery of New Brunswick. A separate New Brunswick Collection was established to ensure a comprehensive historical survey of New Brunswick art, including work by Acadian, Maliseet, and Mi'kmaq artists.

In recent years, the Gallery has been expanding its collection to include a wider selection of modern and contemporary Canadian and International art. The Gallery has acquired many works by well-known First Nations artists, including work by Anong Beam, Carl Beam, and Rebecca Belmore. In 2015 and 2016, the Gallery acquired more than 2000 additional works of art for its permanent collection, representing an outpouring of generosity from donors nationwide. Notable Canadian artists that have been added to the collection include IAIN BAXTER&, Oscar Cahén, Jacques Hurtubise, and Denis Juneau. Internationally, the Gallery has acquired works by many modern and contemporary artists, including Barbara Astman, Hans Hofmann, Edward Kienholz, Dennis Oppenheim, Jean-Paul Riopelle.

In July 2022, the Beaverbrook Art Gallery opened a permanent, dedicated gallery space celebrating the artistic legacy of Mount Allison University. Created in collaboration with Canada's oldest university fine arts program, the space showcases a rotating selection of works by prominent Mount Allison alumni and faculty, including Alex Colville, Mary Pratt, Christopher Pratt, Evergon, and Thaddeus Holownia.

=== Selected works ===
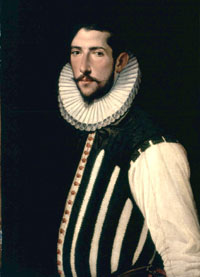
Bartolomeo Passarotti, Portrait of a Young Man, c. 16th century.

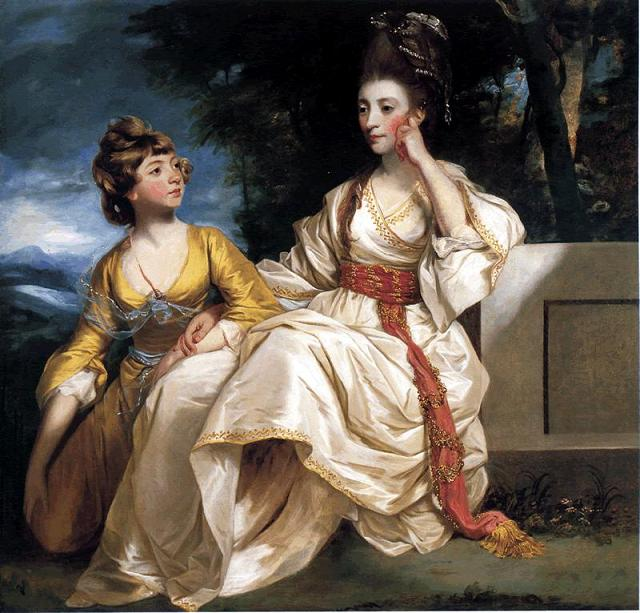
Joshua Reynolds, Portrait of Hester Thrale and her daughter Hester, c. 1777.

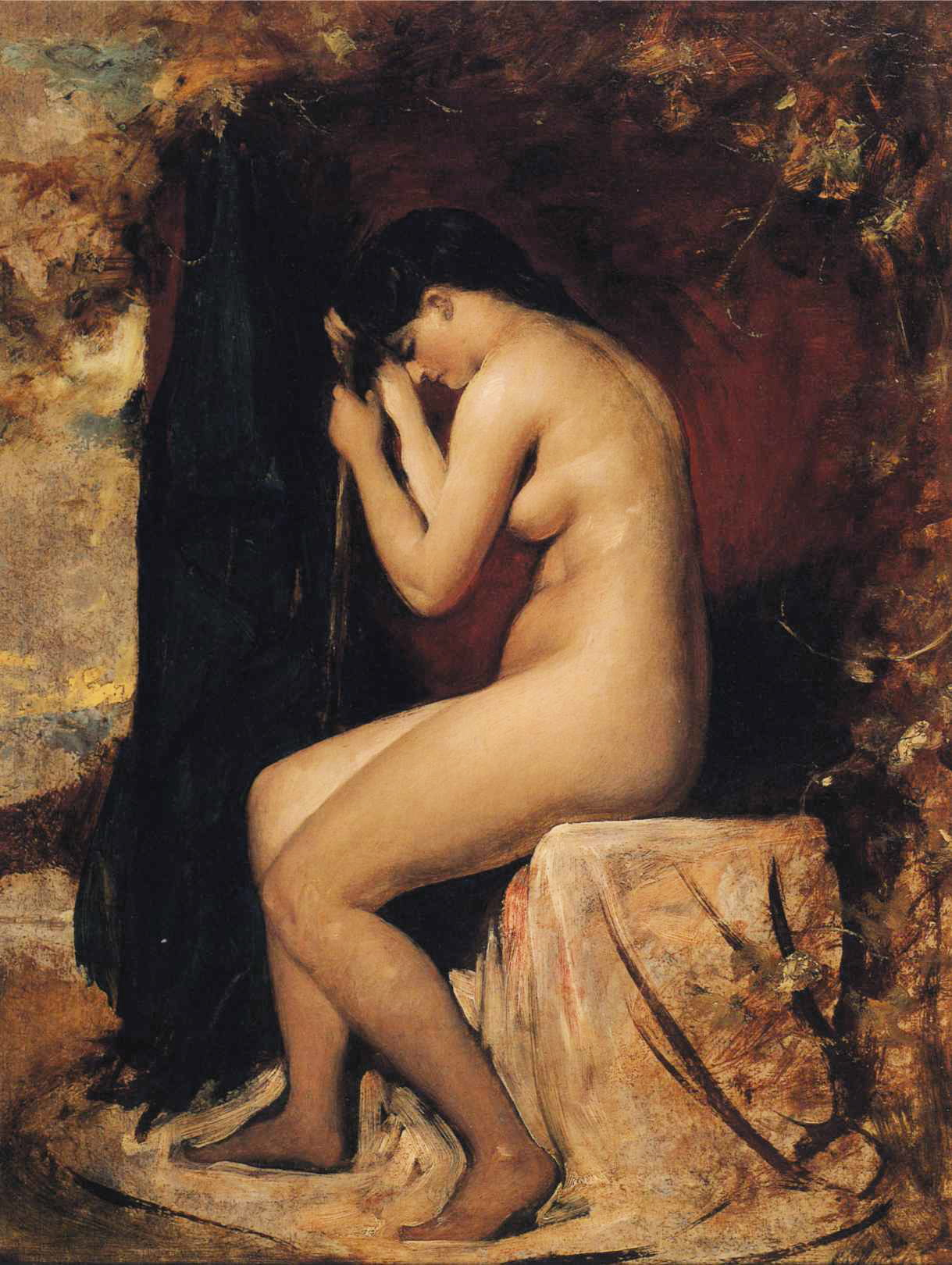
William Etty, Seated Woman Nude, c. 1830s

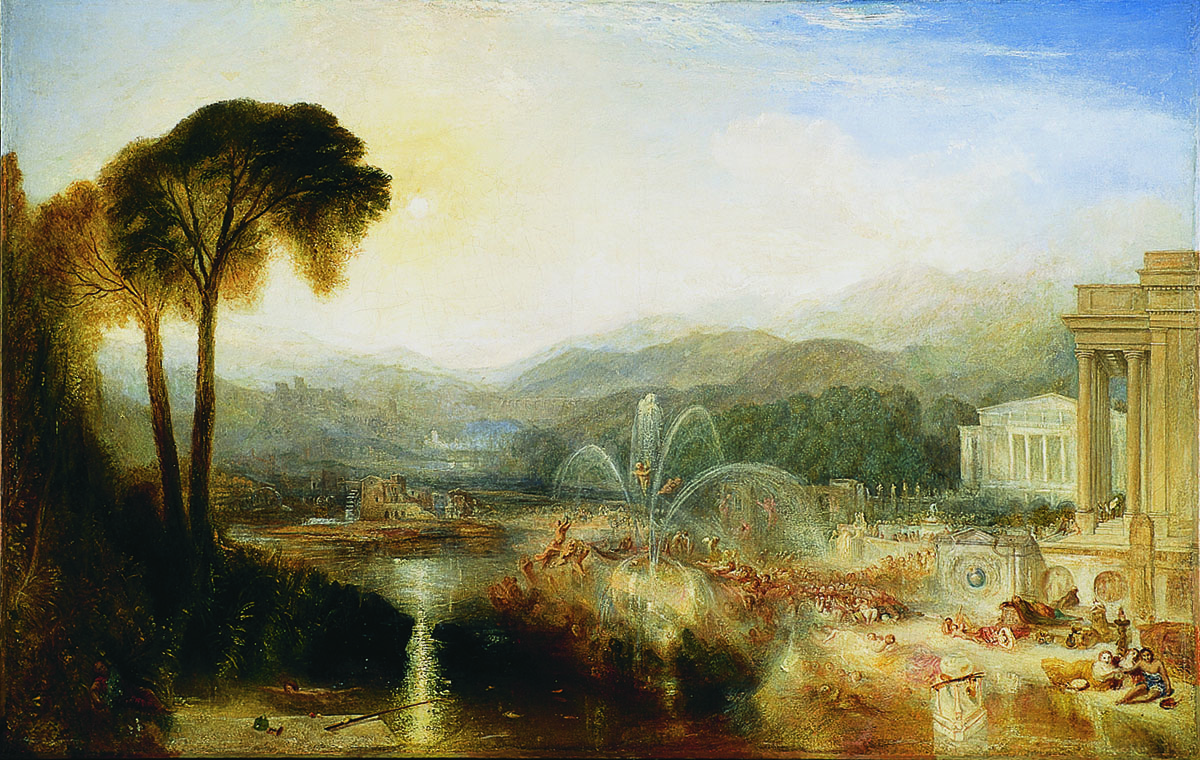
J. M. W. Turner, The Fountain of Indolence, 1834

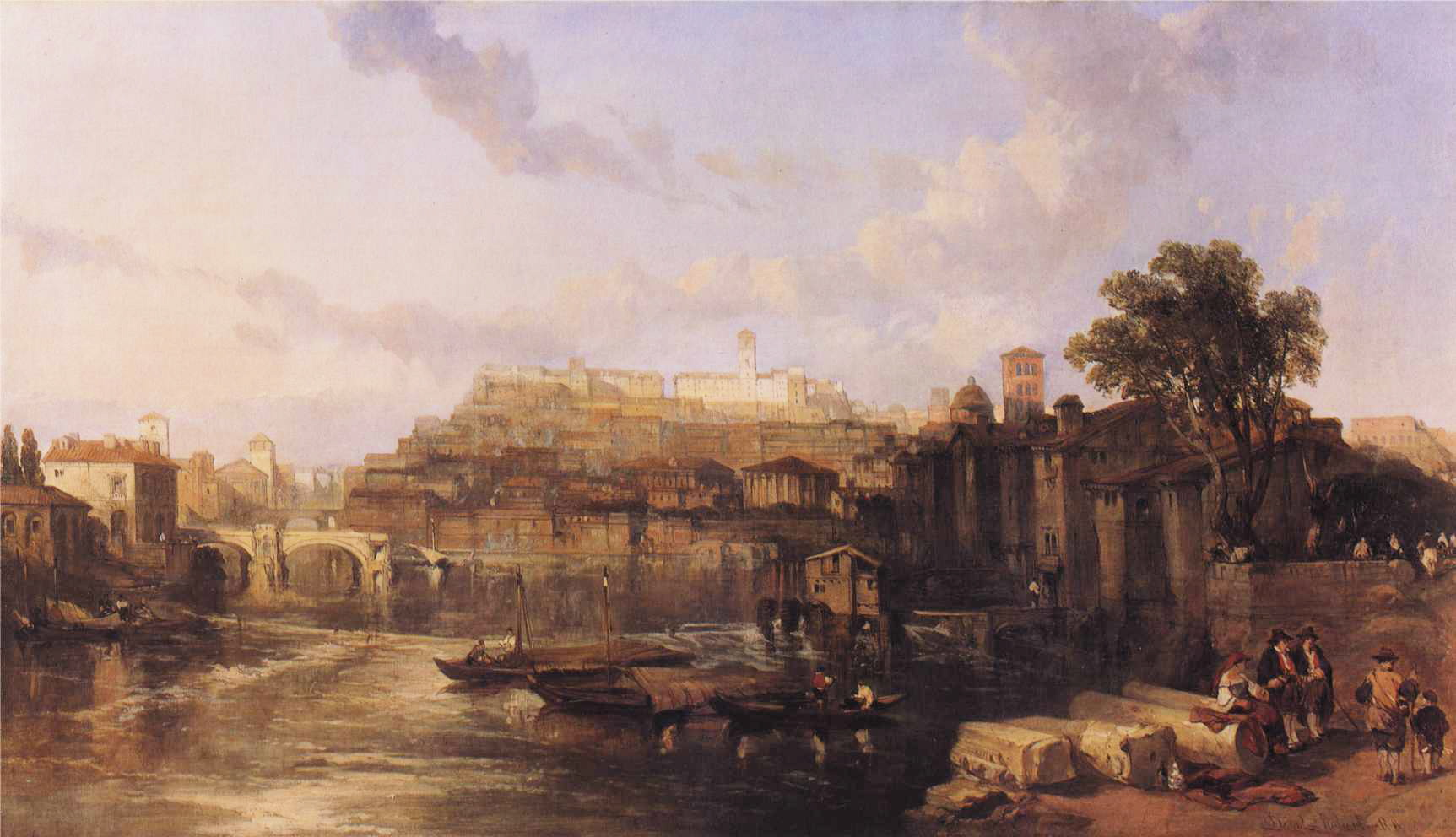
David Roberts, View on the Tiber Looking Towards Mounts Palatine and Aventine, c. 1863

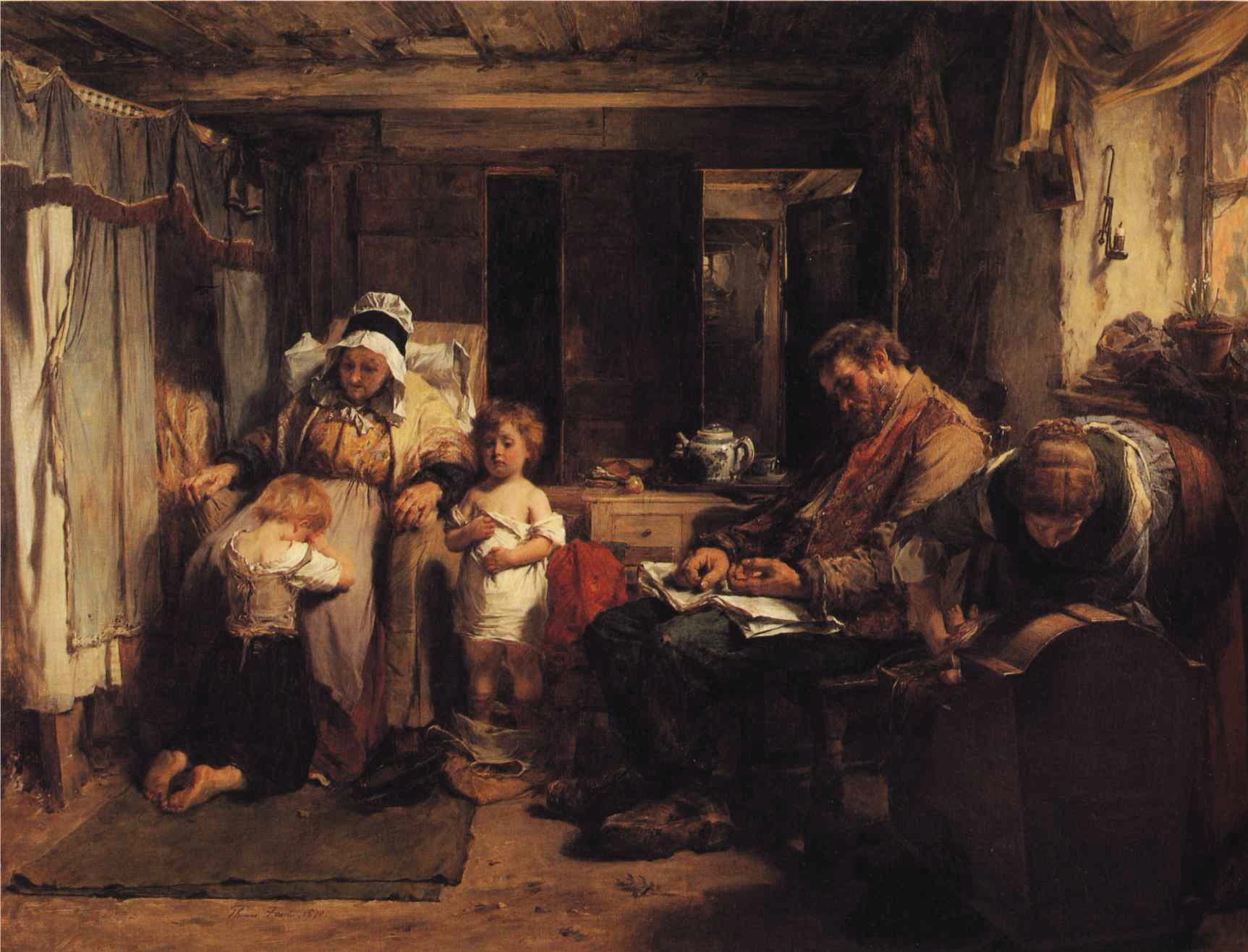
Thomas Faed, When the Day is Done, 1870

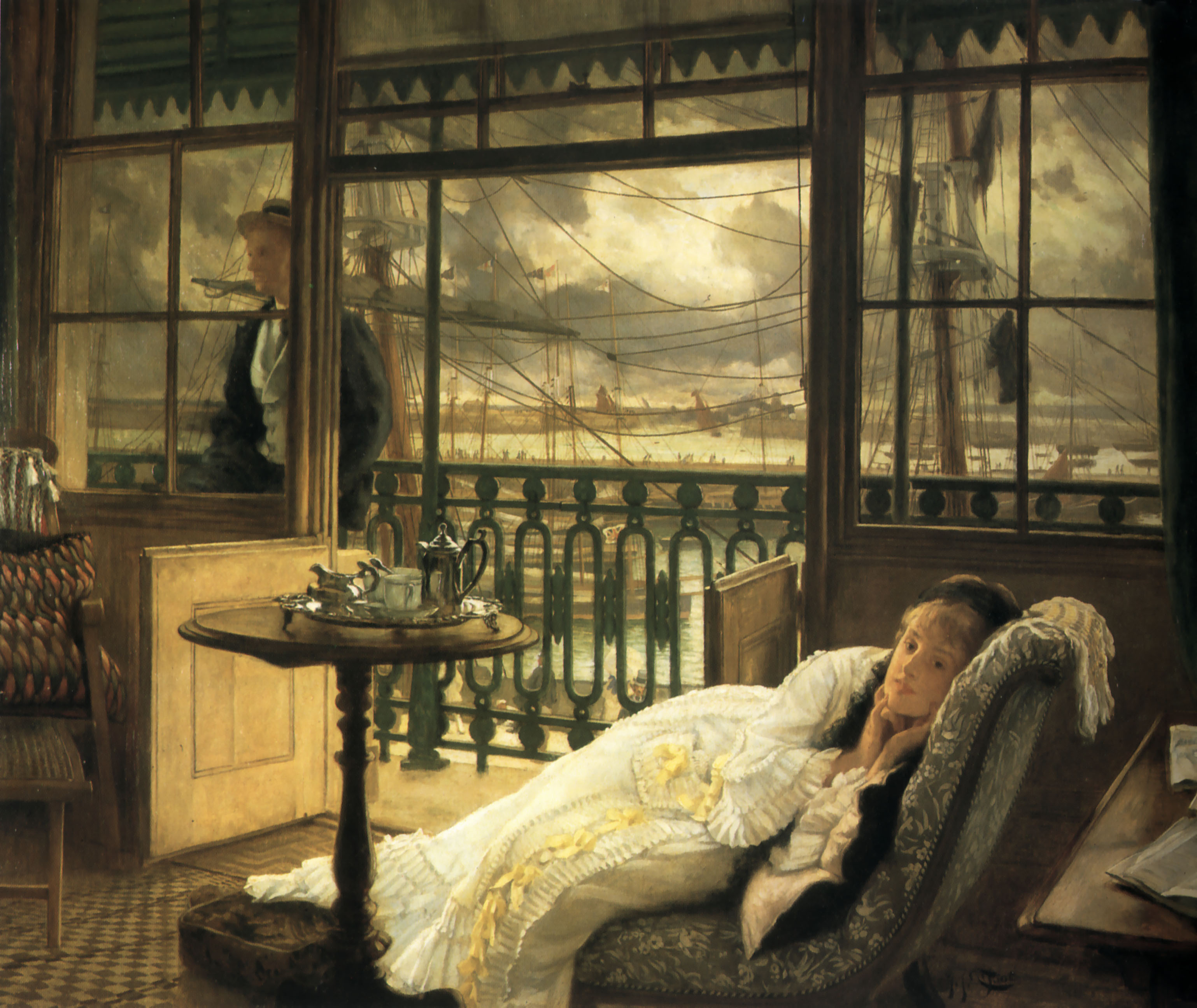
James Tissot, A Passing Storm, c. 1876.

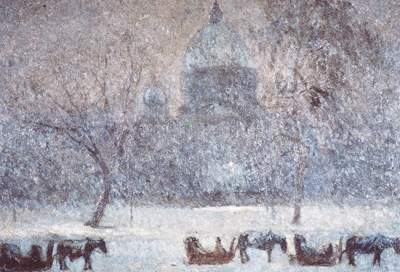
Maurice Cullen, St. James Cathedral, Dominion Sq. Montreal, c. 1909–12.

== Ownership disputes ==
A dispute arose in 2003 between the Gallery and the Beaverbrook U.K. Foundation over custody of the paintings that Lord Beaverbrook had purchased for the collection. This was followed by a second dispute between the Gallery and the Beaverbrook Canadian Foundation over paintings donated to the Gallery by Lady Beaverbrook (formerly Lady Dunn). The foundations proposed to take back and sell some of the most valuable works in the collection to raise funds for their charitable activities. The Beaverbrook Art Gallery maintained that it had received permanent custody of the works, citing the wishes of Lord Beaverbrook himself at the time of the gallery's creation.

=== Beaverbrook U.K. Foundation ===
Since the Gallery's opening, the Beaverbrook U.K. Foundation has paid the insurance premiums for 133 paintings that Lord Beaverbrook donated through the Foundation. In 2002, the Foundation hired Sotheby's to obtain a current valuation of the insured works, which the Gallery's director had valued at $7.6 million in Canadian funds in 2000. Sotheby's valued the collection at £35 million, nearly $90 million in Canadian funds. Turner's 1834 painting The Fountain of Indolence alone was estimated at between $16.7 million and $25 million, and Freud's Hotel Bedroom at between $5.2 million and $8.4 million in Canadian funds.

This large increase in value would entail a corresponding rise in the cost to the Foundation of insuring the works and, in turn, would reduce the amount the Foundation could devote to its charitable causes in England. In 2003, the Foundation, which was headed by Lord Beaverbrook's grandson Maxwell Aitken, proposed to take back and sell the two most valuable paintings, The Fountain of Indolence and Hotel Bedroom. It would use the proceeds to pay the considerably reduced insurance premiums on the remaining works and to fund its causes in England. The Foundation would give the Gallery $5 million for its endowment fund and guarantee that the remaining works would remain in the Gallery for at least the next ten years. This would have required the Gallery's directors to acknowledge that the paintings belonged to the Foundation, which they refused to do. In July 2004, the Gallery and the Beaverbrook U.K. Foundation submitted the case to arbitration under the New Brunswick Arbitration Act, agreeing that the case would be heard by retired Supreme Court of Canada justice Peter Cory.

The dispute proceeded to arbitration, and Cory issued his arbitral award on 26 March 2007. Of the 133 disputed paintings, 85 were ruled as being gifts from the original Lord Beaverbrook, while 48 paintings were to be returned to the custody of the Beaverbrook U.K. Foundation. Cory also ruled that the Foundation had to pay the Gallery $4.8 million in legal costs. The Foundation appealed the award pursuant to a process agreed on by the parties, in which a panel of three retired Canadian judges (Edward Bayda, Coulter Osborne and Thomas Braidwood) heard the appeal. On 9 September 2009, the panel confirmed the original award that divided the paintings between the two parties. The Fountain of Indolence and Hotel Bedroom were among the works that stayed in the Gallery's possession. The appeal panel made no order on the legal costs for the appeal, so this matter remained outstanding. Then, a month after the appeal ruling, the Foundation announced that it would seek to have New Brunswick's Court of Queen's Bench overturn the decision; this in turn got the attention of the Charity Commission for England and Wales, the regulator of philanthropic organizations, which began "pursuing inquiries with the foundation's trustees in connection with ... the foundation's governance and financial affairs, [including] the trustees' pursuit of the litigation against the gallery." On 15 September 2010, the parties announced that the matter was finally settled by private agreement. They maintained the original 85/48 split of the disputed art works and said that they had also agreed on the allocation of legal costs; in a 2013 Afterword to his book on the dispute, New Brunswick author Jacques Poitras reported on speculation that the agreement would see the Foundation avoid paying the Gallery's costs, and that in exchange the Gallery would get a share of the proceeds when the Foundation sold the 48 works that were to be returned to it.

=== Beaverbrook Canadian Foundation ===
The second dispute concerned the Beaverbrook Canadian Foundation's claim to ownership of 78 works that had been donated either personally by Lady Dunn (later Lady Beaverbrook) or by the Dunn Foundation. After Lord Beaverbrook's death in 1964, his widow denied that the paintings belonged to the Gallery and proposed to withdraw them from the collection. In 1970, the Beaverbrook Canadian Foundation, then chaired by Sir Max Aitken, arranged to purchase the paintings from her for a total of $250,000. This was done at the request of Wallace Bird, the Chair of the Gallery's Board of Directors and Lieutenant-Governor of the province, in order to keep them in the custody of the Gallery. On 28 February 2014, the dispute between the Gallery and the Beaverbrook Canadian Foundation was settled out of court, with the Gallery keeping 35 of the works and the Canadian Foundation keeping 43, with the agreement stipulating that those works would be on long-term loan to the Gallery.

== See also ==
- List of art museums
- List of museums in New Brunswick
- The Beavers, a statue located inside the gallery
