= Robert Burns Memorial (Denver) =

Robert Burns Memorial; Denver, CO
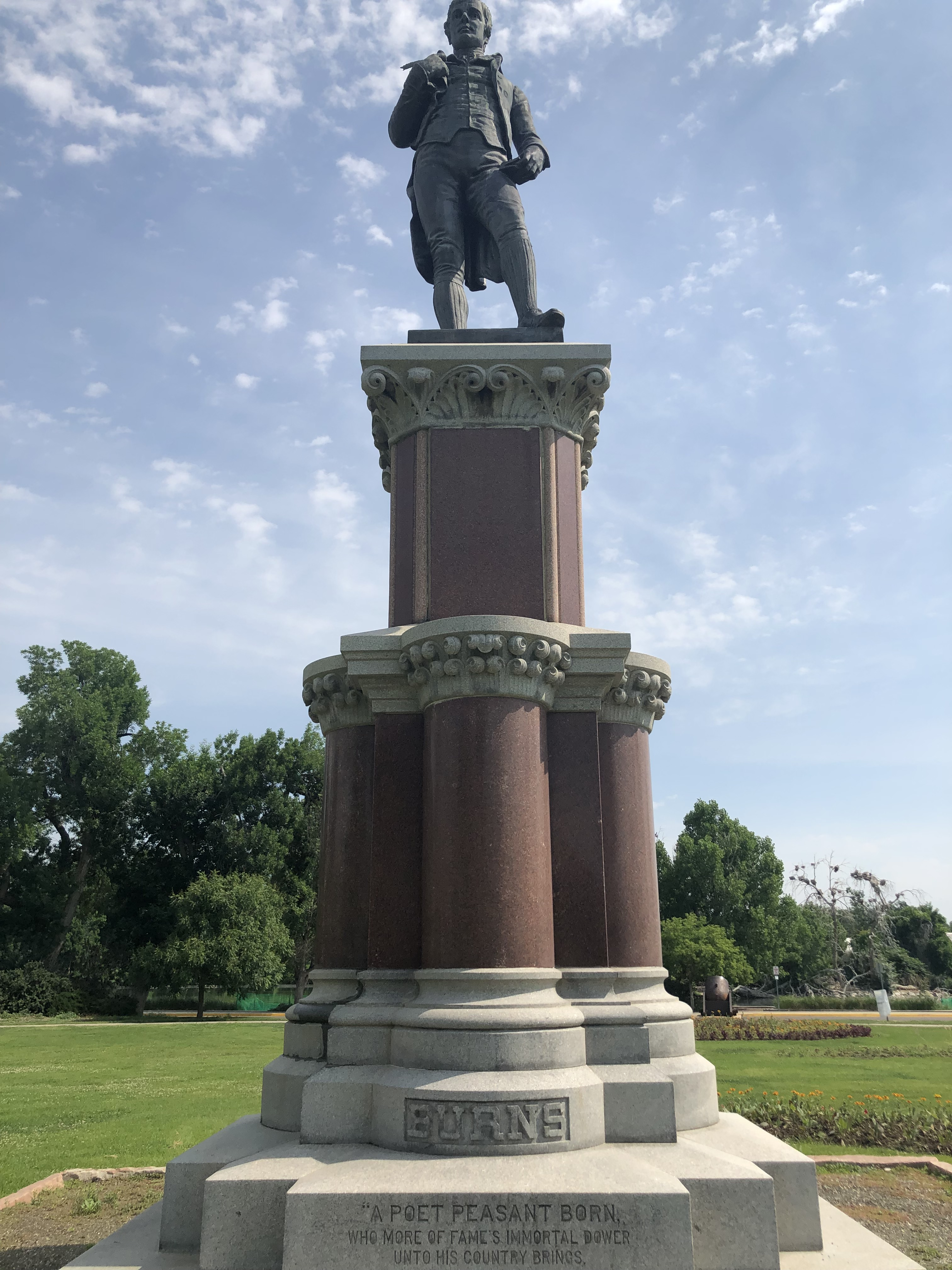
- Robert Burns Memorial in 2022
- Interactive map of: Robert Burns Memorial; Denver, CO
- 39°44′49.58″N 104°57′13.32″W
- Location: City Park; Denver

History
- Dedicated: July 4, 1904; 122 years ago

Site notes
- Elevation: 5,264 ft (1,604 m)
- Height: Statue: 10 ft 10.5 in (3 m); Total: 27 ft 0 in (8 m)
- Sculptor: W.G. Stevenson, R.S.A.

The statue of Robert Burns (also known as the Robert Burns Memorial) in Denver, Colorado, is a work of public art by the Scottish artist William Grant Stevenson, RSA. The Robert Burns Memorial in Denver consists of a bronze statue of the Scottish poet Robert Burns standing on a granite pedestal. The memorial was donated to the City of Denver by the Caledonia Club, No 1, of Colorado and was unveiled on July 4, 1904. The Robert Burns Memorial was the first public memorial to be erected in the City of Denver.

== Memorial Details ==
The Robert Burns Memorial in Denver is composed of a statue, a pedestal, and a base. The memorial has a total height of 8.23 m (27 ft.)

=== Statue ===
The bronze statue represents Burns standing, holding a notebook with fingers in between the pages in his left hand. In his right hand, Burns is holding a quill pen and the collar of his coat. Burns is shown as a young man, in a portrayal inspired by the paintings by Alexander Nasmyth. Burns is dressed in a claw-hammer coat, knee breeches, vest, cravat, and "rig-and-fur" stockings. The statue is 3.3 m (10'-10 1/2") tall, weighs approximately one ton (907 kg), and is made from cast bronze.

The Robert Burns statue in Denver is similar to the marble statue in Kilmarnock, Scotland of Robert Burns; also created by the artist W.G. Stevenson. The Robert Burns statue in Denver, however, has significant differences from the Robert Burns statue in Kilmarnock, including the height of the statue, the posture of the figure, and the materials of construction.

In the years following the completion of the Robert Burns statue in Denver, there were bronze statues with the same dimensions and form, produced by the same artist, erected in other North American cities. The Chicago's Burns

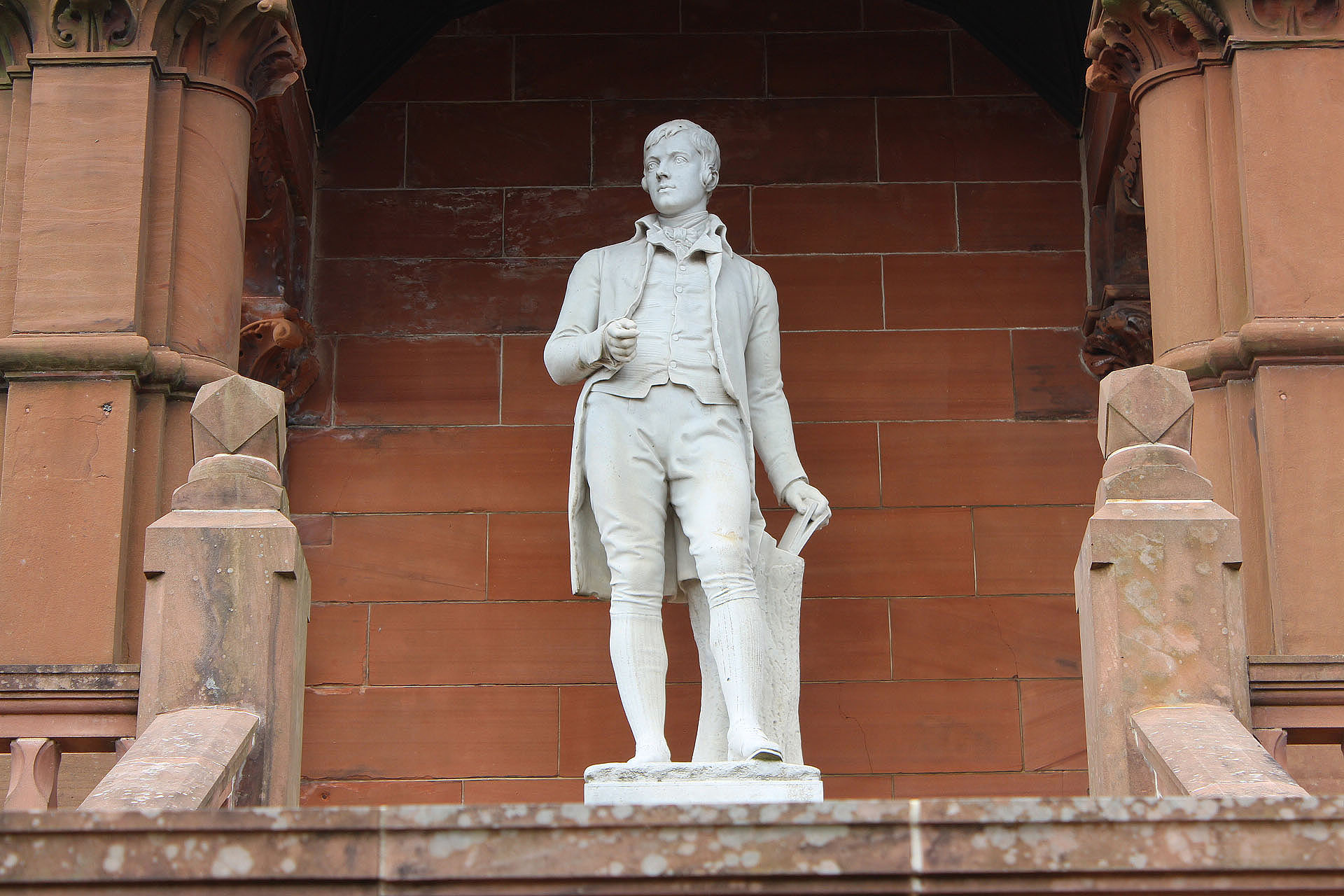
Marble statue of Robert Burns created by the sculptor W. G. Stevenson R.S.A.. The statue is located at the Burns Monument Centre in Kilmarnock, Scotland.

Monument was completed in 1906, New Brunswick's Burns Monument in 1906, and the Milwaukee Burns Monument in 1909. In his 1911 book about memorials erected to Robert Burns, writer Edward Goodwillie quotes Stevenson regarding the Denver and Chicago statues.

"Chicago was the first order, but they put off the commission so long that Denver had the statue erected before them." - William Grant Stevenson

== Sculptor ==
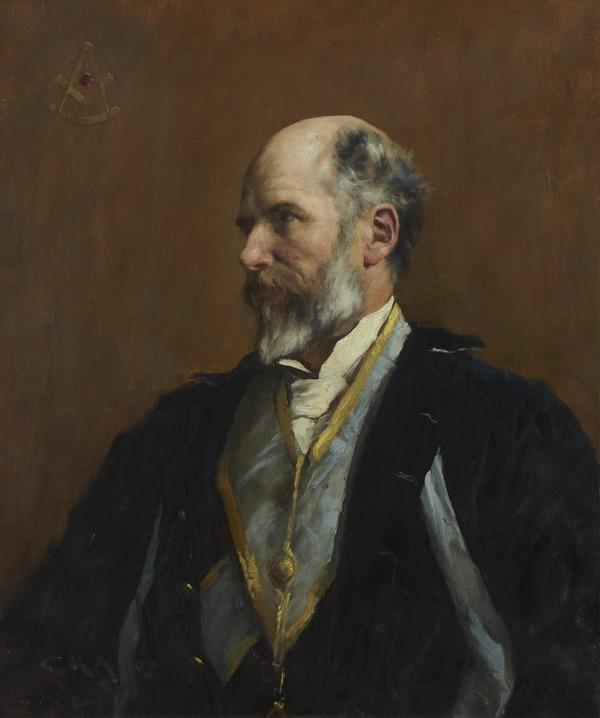
Portrait of William Grant Stevenson, R.S.A.

William Grant Stevenson was a prolific Scottish sculptor and a member of the prestigious artists' collective the Royal Scottish Academy, to which he was elected in 1896. Stevenson first became world famous for his sculptures of Robert Burns in 1879, when his marble statue was selected from 21 competition entries as the best statue for the Burns Monument in Kay Park, Kilmarnock, Scotland. Stevenson worked out of the Dean Studio in Edinburgh with his brother and fellow sculptor, David Watson Stevenson, R.S.A.. W. G. Stevenson is also recognized for his colossal bronze statue of Sir William Wallace in Aberdeen.

=== Pedestal ===
The statue stands upon a base (i.e. plinth) and a pedestal. The base and pedestal have a combined height of 4.88 m (16 ft.) The dimensions of the base are 5.2 m x 5.2 m (17 ft x 17 ft) square. The contract to build the base and pedestal was awarded to The Denver Marble and Granite Company, with design by W. J. Higman. The base and trimmings are made from gray granite quarried in Silver Plume, Colorado.The upper and lower dies of the pedestal are composed of dark red syenite granite from Wisconsin. The Wisconsin syenite granite has been observed to have a very small grain size and minimal amount of mica which make it ideal for monument purposes.

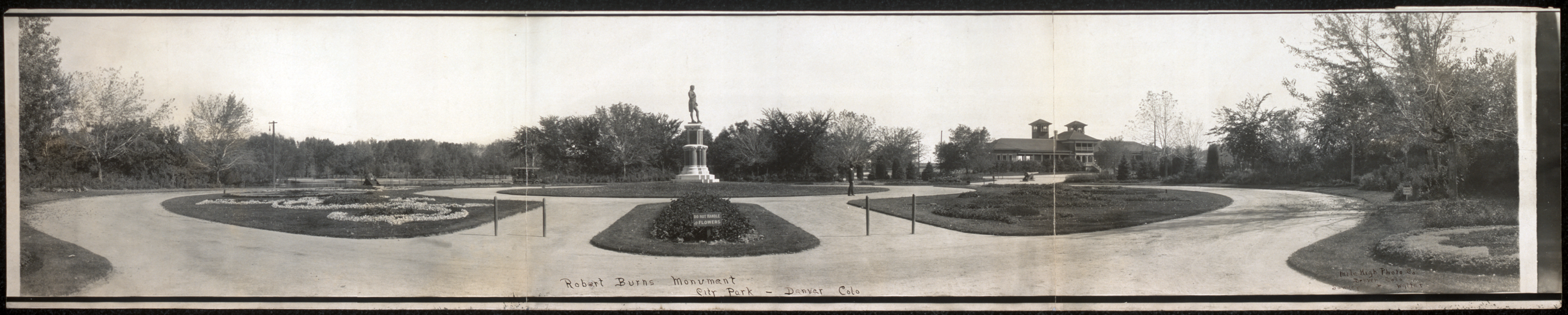
Panoramic photograph of the Robert Burns statute in City Park, Denver, CO. View from the West side of the statue. The statue faces south. Image made available by the U.S. Library of Congress.

=== Location ===
The statue of Robert Burns is located the City Park, Denver, Colorado USA. The statue is south of the Duck Lake and northwest of the City Park Pavilion. The statue is at the center of a large circular walking path. The statue faces south towards Pike's Peak.

=== Text Inscribed on the Memorial ===
The base of the memorial has been inscribed in four locations.

1. Second block of the gray granite base, south-facing A POET PEASANT-BORN, WHO MORE OF FAME'S IMMORTAL DOWER, UNTO HIS COUNTRY BRINGS, THAN ALL HER KINGS.
2. Third block of the gray granite base, south-facing BURNS
3. First block of the gray granite base, east-facing MADE BY THE DENVER MARBLE & GRANITE CO.
4. Second block of the gray granite base, north-facing ERECTED AND UNVEILED BY CALEDONIAN CLUB No 1 OF DENVER, COLO. JULY 4, 1904

==== Award-winning poem engraved on front of memorial ====
The poem engraved on the front of the memorial is an excerpt of an original poem by Miss Isa Craig. In 1859, Miss Isa Craig (1831-1903) won the grand prize in a poetry contest organized by The Crystal Palace in London, England. The Crystal Palace Company organized an original poetry contest and offered a grand prize of fifty guineas for the Best Ode on the Centenary of Robert Burns. The purpose of the Centenary poetry contest was to celebrate one hundred years since the birth of Robert Burns; also referred to as a centennial celebration. More than six hundred poetry entries were received by the contest judges from men and women around the world. The complete poem was published in the London Daily News the day after the event.

==== Engraving added years later ====
The engraving on the north face of the granite base was added in May 1909, crediting the Caledonian Club for erecting and unveiling the statue, was added about five years after the monument had been unveiled.

== Memorial Design ==
In March 1903, a newspaper article was published in The Rocky Mountain News with a proposed design for the Robert Burns memorial in Denver. The newspaper article included an illustration of the proposed design for the statue and pedestal. The proposed design was created by the F.E. Edbrooke Architect Company.

The Edbrooke design was described in The Rocky Mountain News article as follows:

"The pedestal, as designed, will stand seventeen feet high; on each corner of the frieze will be carved the Scotch shields with a lion rampant. Between each shield will be shown the Scotch thistle, a festoon, and a wreath. On the dado corners are shown the Scottish rope mould, and through the rock facing of the stone breaks out the name Burns. Upon the face of the base will be provided panels for the bronze medallions of Burns' principal works, such as the one shown in front, "Cotter's Saturday Night," while on the other three sides will be carven extracts from this proverbs, as "A man's a man for a' that," "Man was made to mourn," "Man's inhumanity to man makes countless thousand mourn."The statue will be erected in the center of the flower plot and the bard will look south toward Pike's Peak, a monument worthy of the eternal gaze of that never dying poet."

The Edbrooke design, however, was not selected as the final design. The successful final design was drawn by W. J. Higman of The Denver Marble and Granite Company. An illustration of the final design, drawn by W. J. Higman, was published in The Rocky Mountain News in February 1904, along with a description:

"The erection of a monument to "Rabbie" Burns, the ploughman bard of Scotland, which has long been a cherished project of every patriotic Scotchman in Denver, will soon be an accomplished fact.

The contract for the pedestal has been awarded to the Denver Marble and Granite company, the successful design having been drawn by W. J. Higman.

The figure surmounting the pedestal will be a portrait statue of Robert Burns of heroic size, executed by W. Grant Stevenson of Edinburgh, Scotland, whose statue of Burns at Kilmarnock, Scotland, is considered the best representation of Burns Naismith (sic) portrait. The statue will be erected in City park, and will be twenty-six feet in height."

== Fundraising for the Robert Burns Statue ==
The Caledonian Club No. 1, of Colorado led the fundraising effort for the Robert Burns Statue. They organized fundraising events, posted information in newspapers, and organized a Burns Monument Committee. News of an effort to collect funds for the erection of a monument to Robert Burns was announced in the Denver newspapers several years before the monument was completed. Mr. J. D. McGilvray attended a Kilmarnock Burns' Club meeting on January 31, 1890 that was also attended by Mr. W.G. Stevenson, A.R.S.A., Edinburgh.

=== Fundraising Events ===
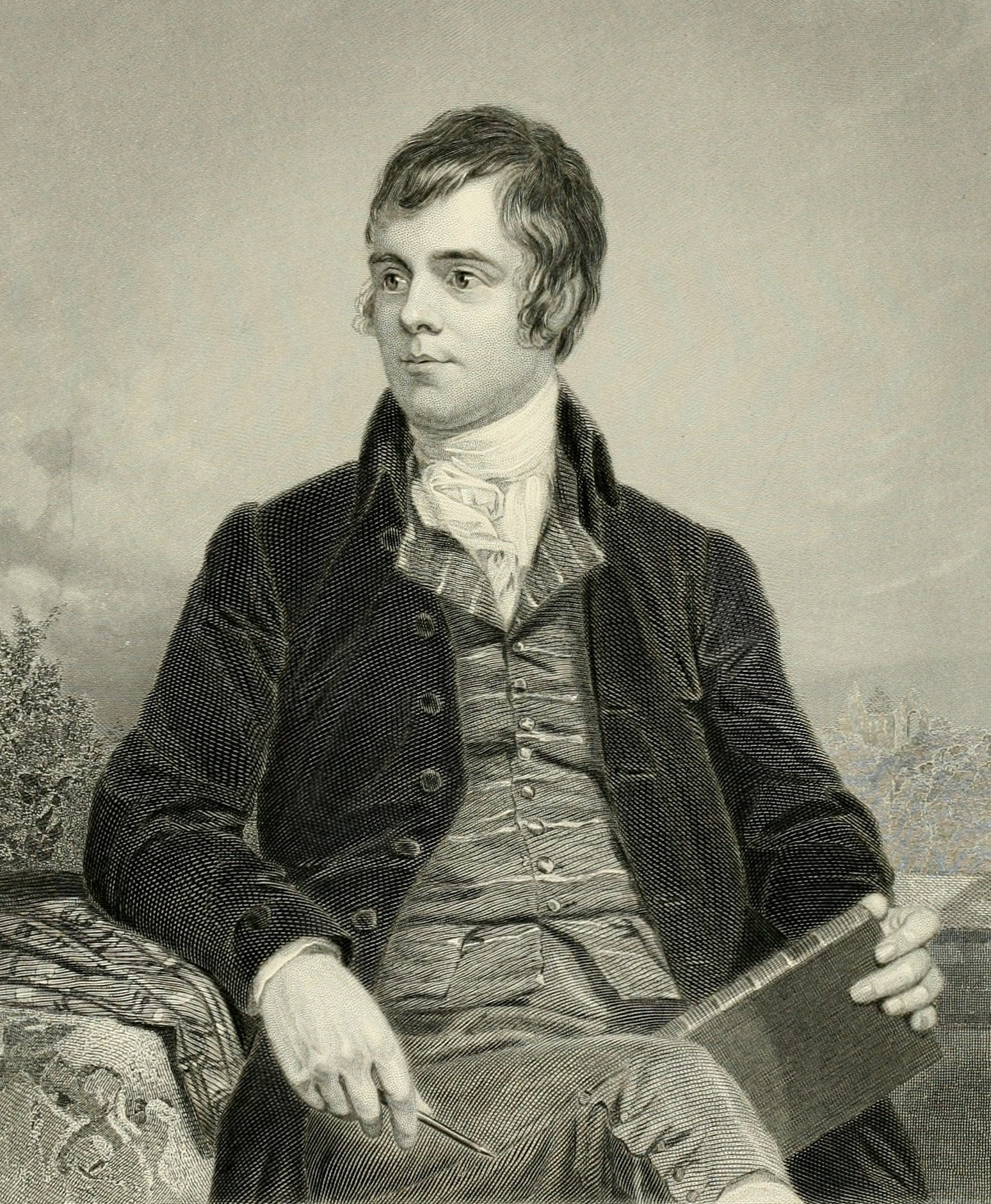
Robert Burns lithograph from original painting by Chappel

On January 25th, 1896, a grand concert was held at the Tabor Grand Opera House in Denver. The event was organized by the Caledonian Club and was a celebration of the 137th birthday of Robert Burns. An address was given to the audience by Governor McIntire.

During January 1897, a concert was held at Trinity M.E. Church to celebrate the 138th anniversary of the birth of Robert Burns. The former governor of Colorado, Governor Alva Adams, gave a speech on Robert Burns' life and work. The proceeds from the event were added to the fundraising effort for the Burns Monument.

In July 1902, the Caledonian Club, No. 1, of Colorado held a Highland Games at Manhattan Beach; the event was the 22nd annual Highland Games organized by the club. The proceeds from that year's Highland Games, estimated to be $500, were added to the fundraising effort for the Robert Burns Statue.

=== Fundraising Goal ===
The fundraising goal over the course of the years. The cost of the bronze statue was $6,000 in 1904. By the time the statue was unveiled in 1904, the reported total cost of the memorial was $10,000.

When adjusted for inflation, $10,000 in 1904 is worth $350,935 in 2024.

==== Prominent Donors To The Statue ====
Below is a list of prominent donors and their financial contributions to the Robert Burns Statue. The donor names and donation amounts were printed in the local newspaper.

Donor Name	Donation Amount (USD - 1904)
Caledonian Club No. 1 of Denver	$1,000
John McNeil	$500
John D. McGilvray	$500
A. M. Stevenson	$500
D. H. Moffat	$500
James B. Grant	$200
J. K. Mullen	$100

=== Burns Monument Committee ===
The members of the Burns Monument committee and there positions were printed in the newspaper.

- William B. McGilvray, chairman
- Peter Menzies, recording and corresponding secretary
- George Campbell, financial secretary
- David H. Moffat, treasurer
- John D. McGilvray, committee member
- John McNeil, committee member
- David D. Seerie, committee member
- A. M. Stevenson, committee member
- A. I. Gray, committee member
- Richard McKnight, committee member
- Peter Morrison, committee member
- Edward Alexander, committee member
- T. W. Duncan, committee member
- John Heartz, committee member
- R. M. Morrison, committee member
- John G. MacKenzie, committee member

== Unveiling Ceremony ==
The unveiling ceremony for the statue of Robert Burns was held on July 4th, 1904. A temporary stage and stand was erected for the program of speakers, chorus, and bagpipers. A vast crowd encircled the monument beyond the reach of the speakers voices; as reported and photographed by the Rocky Mountain News.

The chief orator at the unveiling ceremony was John D. McGilvray, a former resident of Denver and former chieftain of the Caledonian Club.

Denver's Mayor Speer spoke on behalf of the city and county of Denver and thanked the members of the Caledonian Club for erecting the statue. W.B. M'Gilvray addressed the audience as the current Chief of the Caledonian Club and the Chairman of the Burns Monument Committee. Several special guests were in attendance at the unveiling ceremony. The sculptor, W.G. Stevenson, traveled from his home in Edinburgh, Scotland to Denver so that he could attend the unveiling ceremony.

The statue was unveiled by Miss Jane Morrison, daughter of the Chieftain of the Caledonian Club.

== See also ==
- Robert Burns
- List of Robert Burns memorials
- Statue of Robert Burns (San Francisco)
- Statue of Robert Burns (Albany, New York)
- Statue of Robert Burns (Boston)
- Statue of Robert Burns (Milwaukee)
- Robert Burns Memorial (Barre)
- Robert Burns Memorial, Stanley Park
- Robert Burns Memorial (Montreal)
- Robert Burns Memorial Statue (Fredericton) - Another statue of Robert Burns by William Grant Stevenson
- Robert Burns (Steell)
- Robert Burns World Federation
