= List of public art in East Ayrshire =

Map of Scotland with the East Ayrshire council area highlighted

This is a list of public art in East Ayrshire, one of the 32 local government council areas of Scotland. The area borders Dumfries and Galloway, East Renfrewshire, North Ayrshire, South Ayrshire and South Lanarkshire. This list applies only to works of public art on permanent display in an outdoor public space and does not, for example, include artworks in museums.

== Benquhat ==
Image	Title / subject	Location and coordinates	Date	Artist / designer	Type	Material	Dimensions	Designation	Wikidata	Notes
	War memorial	Benquhat	c. 1920s		Obelisk	Granite				Benquhat is the site of an abandoned village near Bellsbank.

== Cumnock ==
Image	Title / subject	Location and coordinates	Date	Artist / designer	Type	Material	Dimensions	Designation	Wikidata	Notes
More images	Mercat cross	Cumnock	1703, repaired 1955		Pillar on steps	Stone		Category A	Q17124679	
	Keir Hardie	Cumnock	1992	Benno Schotz	Bust on pedestal	Bronze and stone				

== Darvel ==
Image	Title / subject	Location and coordinates	Date	Artist / designer	Type	Material	Dimensions	Designation	Wikidata	Notes
More images	James Smith Covenanter Memorial	Gallow Law, Molmont Hill, Darvel	1926		Cairn and weather vine	Stone				

== Dunlop ==
Image	Title / subject	Location and coordinates	Date	Artist / designer	Type	Material	Dimensions	Designation	Wikidata	Notes
	War memorial	Dunlop	c. 1920s		Celtic cross with plaque	Granite and bronze				

== Kilmarnock ==
Image	Title / subject	Location and coordinates	Date	Artist / designer	Type	Material	Dimensions	Designation	Wikidata	Notes
More images	Robert Burns	Burns Monument Centre, Kilmarnock	1879	William Grant Stevenson	Statue on pedestal	Stone		Category B		
More images	Reformers' Monument	Kay Park, Kilmarnock	1885	Robert Samson Ingram, architect	Column on pedestal	Stone		Category B	Q17791625	
	Memorial to Blanche, Lady Howard de Walden	Dean Castle, Kilmarnock			Statue group on pedestal	Bronze and stone				
	Johnnie Walker	Kilmarnock			Statue	Bronze				

== Kilmaurs ==
Image	Title / subject	Location and coordinates	Date	Artist / designer	Type	Material	Dimensions	Designation	Wikidata	Notes
	War memorial	Morton Park, Kilmaurs	1921	William Kellock Brown	Obelisk with statue and plaques	Stone and bronze				

== Mauchline ==
Image	Title / subject	Location and coordinates	Date	Artist / designer	Type	Material	Dimensions	Designation	Wikidata	Notes
More images	1685 Covenanters Martyrs' Memorial	Loan Green, Mauchline	1885		Obelisk	Stone				
	War memorial	Mauchline	c. 1920s		Column on pedestal with plaques	Sandstone and bronze				
More images	Jean Armour	The Cross, Mauchline	2002		Statue on pedestal					

== Muirkirk ==
Image	Title / subject	Location and coordinates	Date	Artist / designer	Type	Material	Dimensions	Designation	Wikidata	Notes
More images	Memorial to John Browm	Presthill Moor, near Muirkirk			Pedestal and grave	Stone		Category C		
More images	John Lapraik memorial	Muirkirk	1914		Cairn with plaque	Stone and metal		Category B		
More images	John Loudon MacAdam memorial	Muirkirk	1931		Cairn with plaque	Stone			Q65098949	
	Miners' Memorial	Muirkirk	2004	Kirti Mandir	Statue on pedestal	Bronze and stone				

== New Cumnock ==
Image	Title / subject	Location and coordinates	Date	Artist / designer	Type	Material	Dimensions	Designation	Wikidata	Notes
	War memorial	Old Cemetery, New Cumnock	1921	Sir John James Burnet (Architect)	Cenotaph	Stone				
More images	Miners Memorial	Miners Memorial Garden, New Cumnock			Miners' Lamp structure on pedestal	Metal and stone				
More images	Miners Memorial	Miners Memorial Garden, New Cumnock			Sculpture on pedestal	Stone				
	Robert Burns	New Cumnock			Statue on pedestal	Cast iron and stone				

== Newmilns ==
Image	Title / subject	Location and coordinates	Date	Artist / designer	Type	Material	Dimensions	Designation	Wikidata	Notes
	War memorial	Lady Flora's Institute, Newmilns	1922	Scott & Rae (makers)	Statue on pedestal	Stone				

== Stewarton ==
Image	Title / subject	Location and coordinates	Date	Artist / designer	Type	Material	Dimensions	Designation	Wikidata	Notes
	War memorial	Stewarton	1921	Scott & Rae (makers)	Obelisk on pedestal	Granite				
