= Archibald Stevenson =

Archibald Stevenson may refer to:

- Archie Stevenson (1858–1922), American politician from Colorado
- Archibald Stevenson (American football) (1871–1925), American football player and coach
- Archibald E. Stevenson (1884–1961), American attorney and legislative researcher
