= Burns Commons =

Park in Milwaukee, Wisconsin

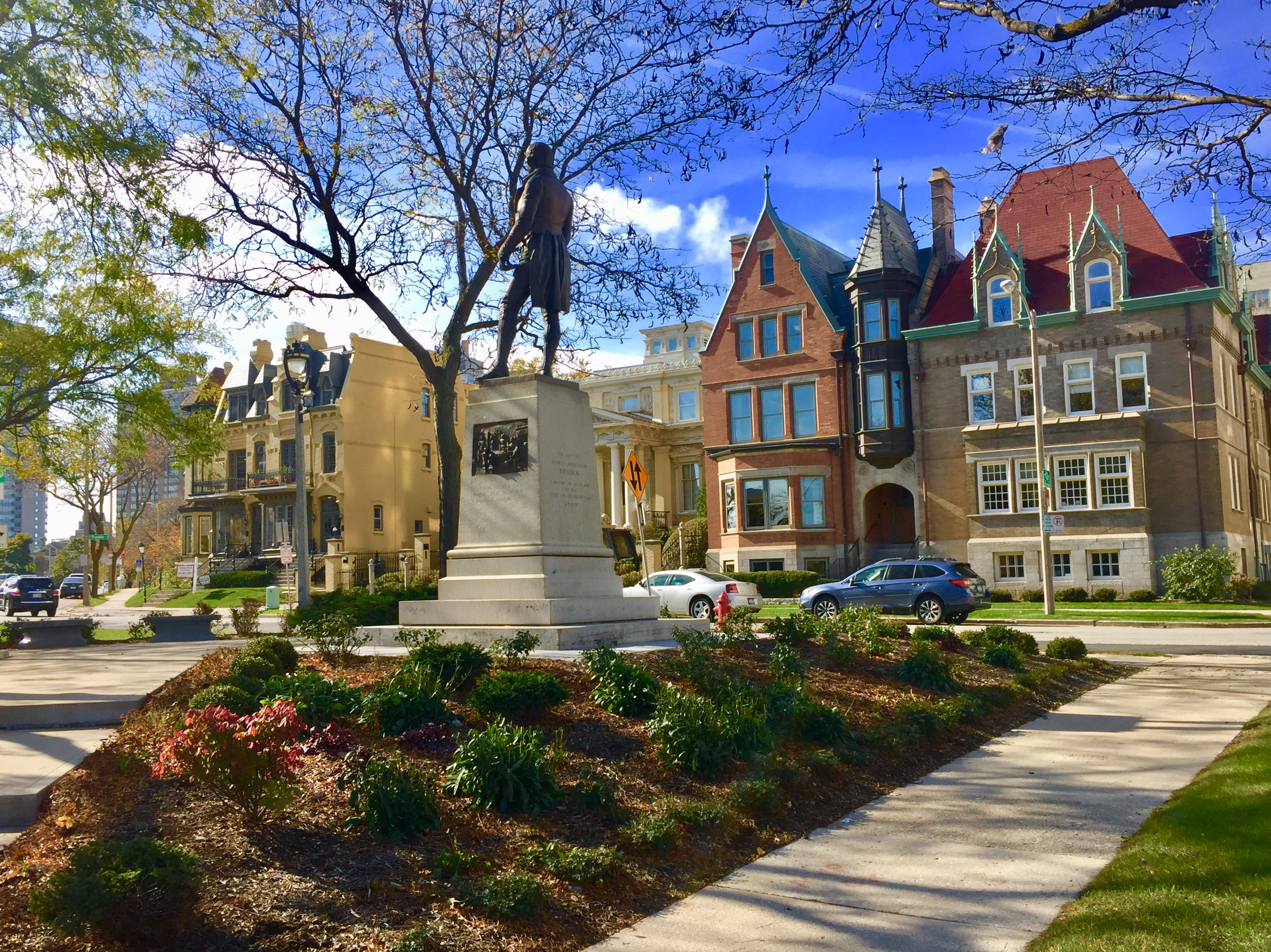
- The south end of the park, with monument to Robert Burns.
- Interactive map of Burns Commons
- Type: Municipal
- Location: Milwaukee, Wisconsin
- Coordinates: 43.04747°N 87.89639°W
- Area: 1.5 acres (0.61 ha)
- Created: 1847
- Operator: Milwaukee County Parks

Burns Commons is a park in Milwaukee, Wisconsin. Located on the East Side of the city, it is bound by Prospect Avenue to the south, N Franklin Place to the east, and E Ogden Avenue to the north, with E Knapp Street splitting through the park. The larger, northern section is landscaped with trees, lawn, walkways, and public art. The smaller southern portion contains a statue of Scottish poet Robert Burns.

The northern terminus of the Hop M-Line is located on the north end of Burns Commons, along E Ogden Avenue.

== History ==
In 1847, developer James H. Rogers donated the land to the city, making it one of Milwaukee's earliest parks. Initially named First Ward Park, it was later renamed Franklin Square. As stately homes were built around the park, four neighboring homeowners took on upkeep, providing the landscaping and constructing a fountain. By the turn of the 20th century, the park was known locally as "Baby Park", as nursemaids in the neighborhood frequently took children and babies to the park.

In 1909, a statue of Scottish poet Robert Burns was donated by Scottish immigrant James Anderson Bryden; it was erected on the south end of the park, and officially dedicated on June 26, 1909. The bronze statue, set on a plinth of Nova Scotia granite, was designed by Scottish sculptor William Grant Stevenson.

In 1937, the parks of Milwaukee and Milwaukee County were consolidated into the Milwaukee County Parks system. At that time, the park became known as Robert Burns Triangle. This was not official, however, since a deed restriction required the name to be kept as Franklin Square. In 1994, the restriction was removed and the park was officially renamed.

During the design of the Hop, Burns Commons was chosen as the northern terminus of the M-Line. Construction began in 2016, and officially opened to public use on November 2, 2018.

Preceding station	The Hop	Following station
Ogden at Astor toward Intermodal Station	M-Line	Terminus

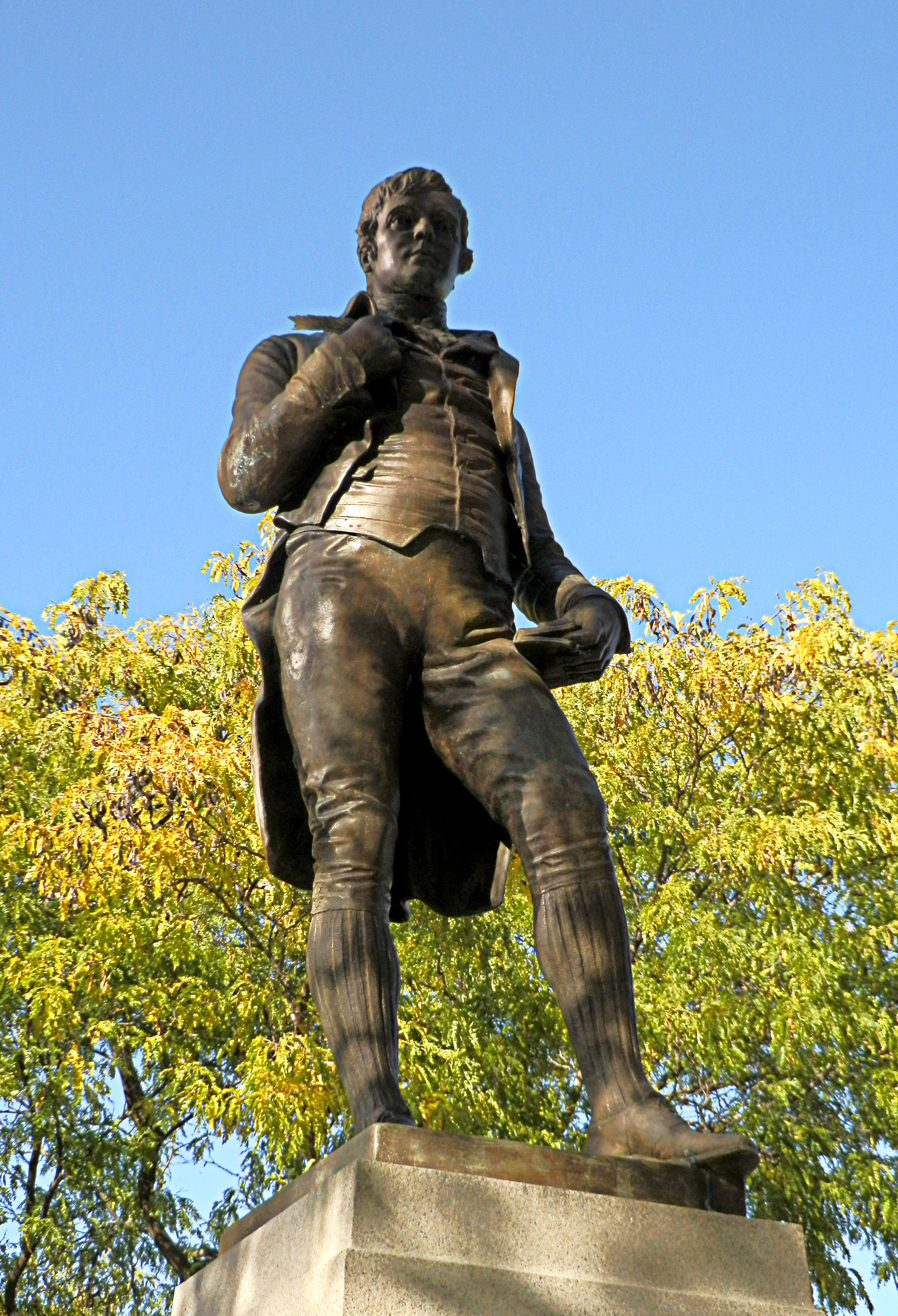
Robert Burns statue

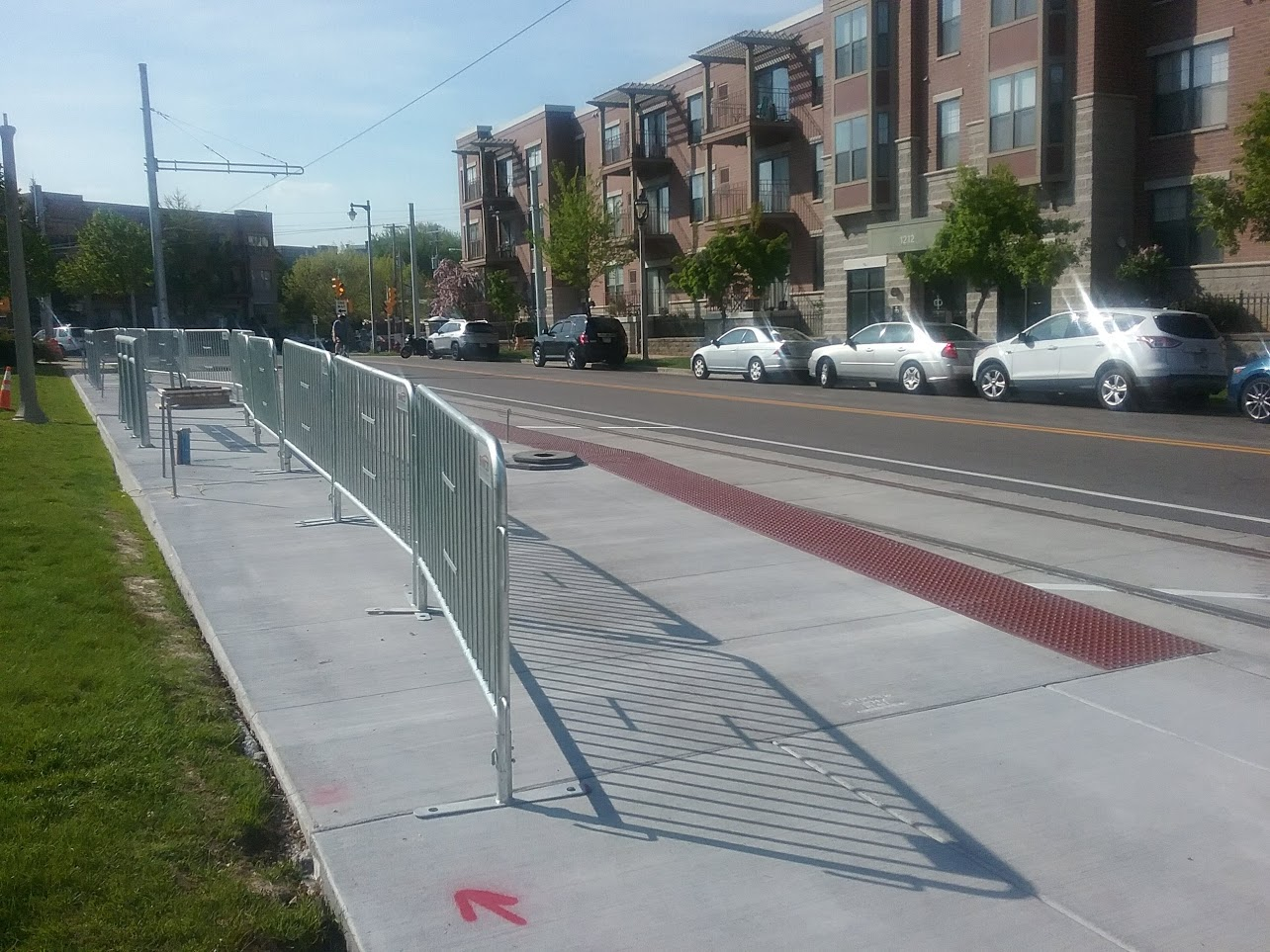
Burns Commons Station under construction on May 24, 2018

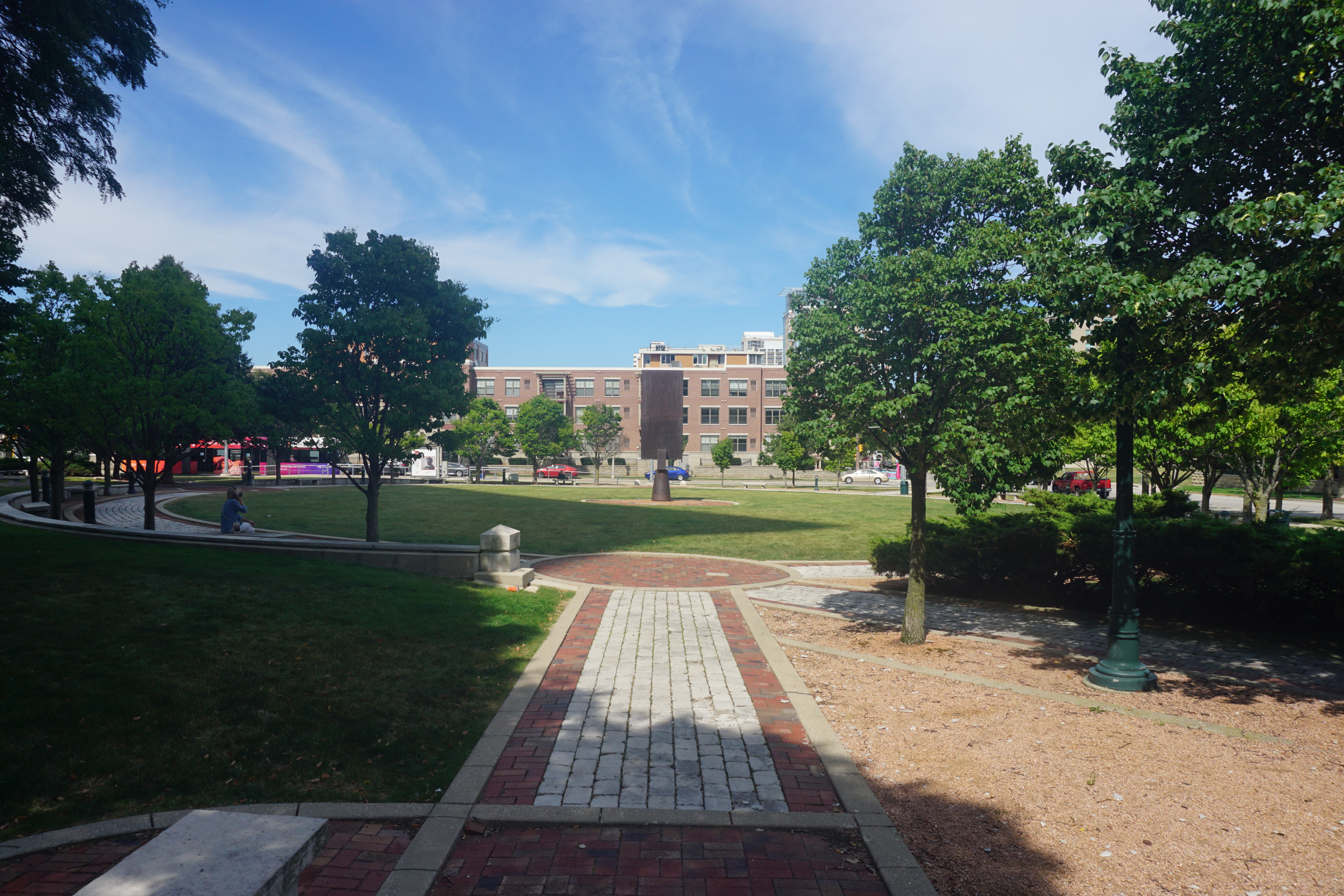
Burns Commons in 2022

== See also ==
- Robert Burns statue
- Parks of Milwaukee
