= Statue of Robert Burns (Milwaukee) =

1909 bronze statue of Scottish bard Robert Burns in Milwaukee, Wisconsin

Robert Burns Statue Milwaukee
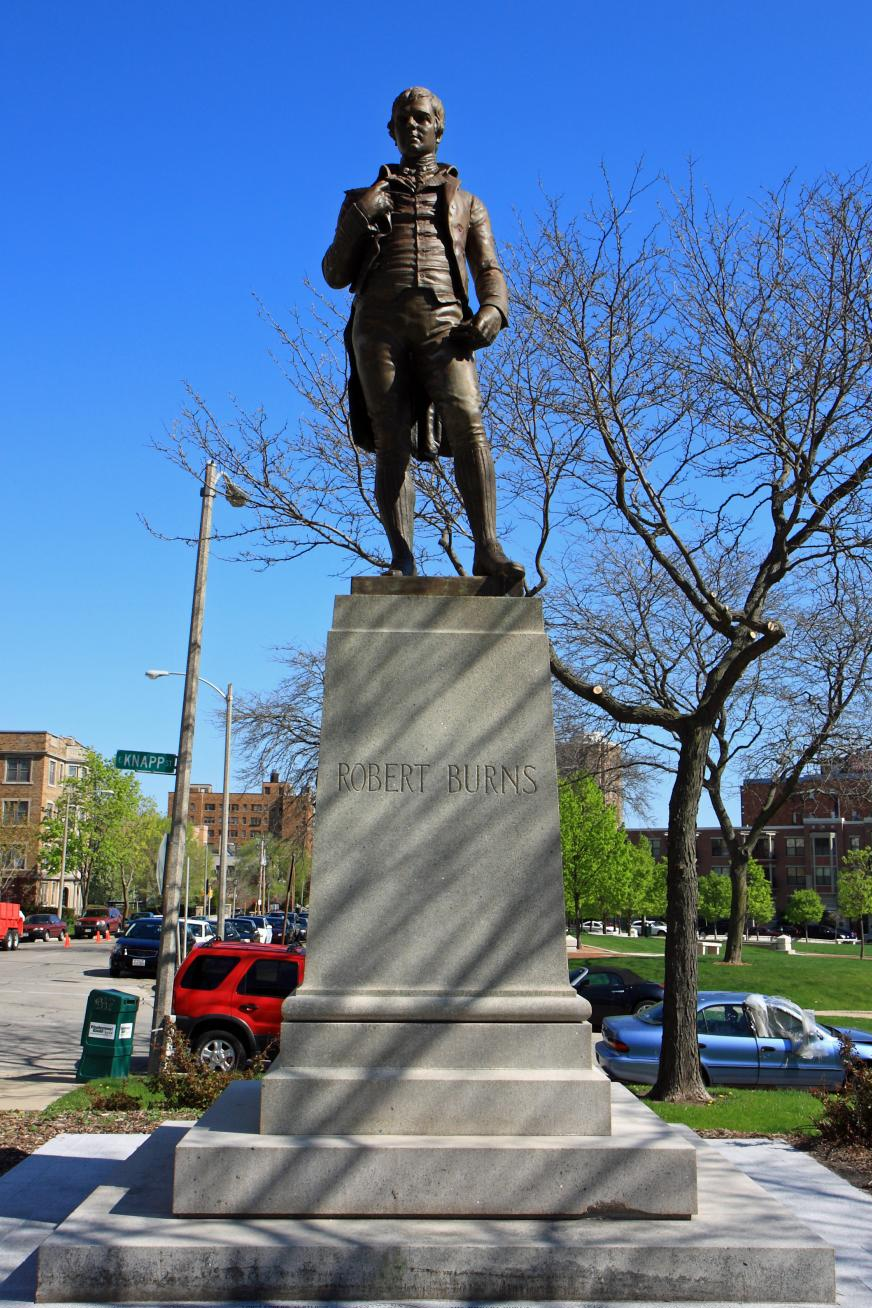
- Artist: William Grant Stevenson, R.S.A.
- Year: 1909
- Type: statue
- Medium: Cast bronze statue, cast bronze bas relief panels, Nova Scotia pink granite plinth
- Subject: Robert Burns, Scottish bard
- Dimensions: 3.7 m × 1.1 m × 1.1 m (12 ft 0 in × 3 ft 6 in × 3 ft 6 in)
- Weight: 1,000 kg (2,200 lbs)
- Location: Milwaukee; 43°02′48.0″N 87°53′48.5″W
- Owner: Milwaukee County

The Robert Burns Monument is a bronze statue of the Scottish bard and poet Robert Burns, located in Burns Commons on the Lower East Side of Milwaukee, Wisconsin. The statue was designed by Scottish sculptor William Grant Stevenson and unveiled in 1909. The public artwork was a gift to the City of Milwaukee from James Bryden, a local grain merchant and Scottish immigrant. The Burns statue remains a focal point of Milwaukee’s Scottish-American heritage and the site of annual commemorative ceremonies.

Robert Burns is widely regarded as one of Scotland’s greatest cultural figures, celebrated for his enduring poetry, lyrical genius, and deep connection to the common people. Often called the "Ploughman Poet" or Scotland’s "National Bard," Burns captured themes of love, nature, social justice, and national identity in a voice that was both personal and universal. Each year on New Year’s Eve, millions of people around the world sing Auld Lang Syne, a traditional Scottish folk song that was popularized by Robert Burns, as a farewell to the old year and a tribute to enduring friendship.

For many, Burns embodies the democratic spirit of poetry—accessible, poignant, and unflinchingly honest—which is why he continues to be honored in monuments and celebrations around the world. Robert Burns’ use of the Scots language helped preserve and elevate Scottish cultural heritage. His celebrated poems—including The Cotter’s Saturday Night, A Man’s a Man for A’ That, The Twa Dogs, and To a Mouse —are widely recognized for their enduring themes of empathy, camaraderie, and social equality.

Of all the poets, ancient and modern, there is none so near the heart of the common people as Robert Burns, familiarly known the world over as "Bobbie Burns".

— J.V. Quarles, Speech at Unveiling Ceremony for Burns Statue, June 26, 1909

== Sculptor ==
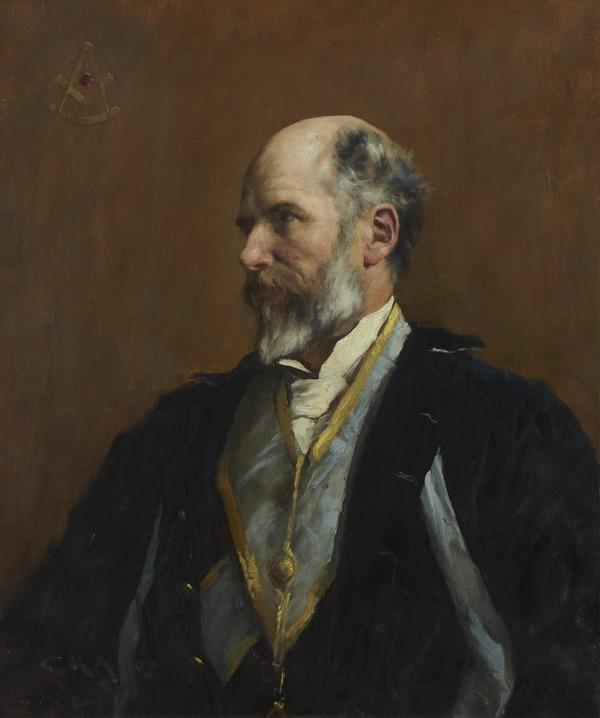
William Grant Stevenson, R.S.A.1849 - 1919. Painter and sculptorNational Galleries of Scotland

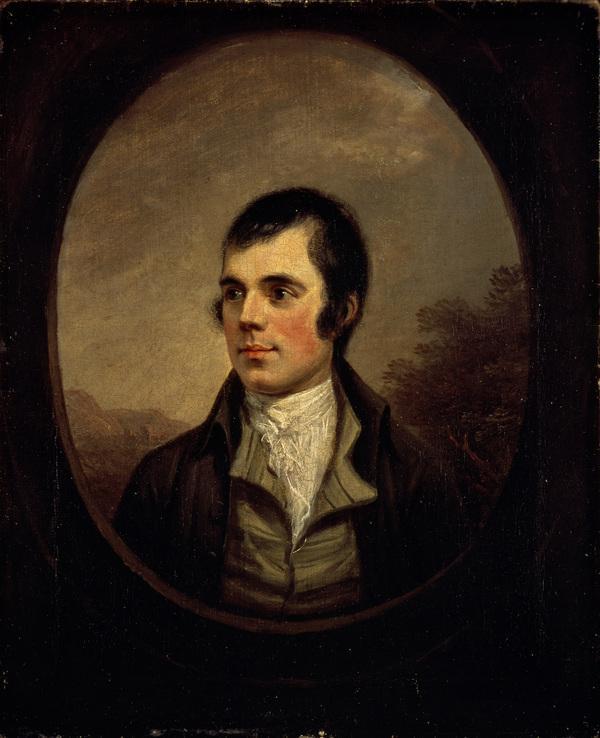
Alexander Nasmyth, Robert Burns, 1759–1796. Portrait of Robert Burns, 1787, Oil on canvas, Scottish National Portrait Gallery

William Grant Stevenson, R.S.A. (Note: Stevenson was elected to the Royal Scottish Academy in 1896.) was a renowned Scottish painter and sculptor. He lived in Edinburgh, Scotland and worked in the Dean Studio. His brother, David Watson Stevenson, was also a renowned sculptor.

Grant Stevenson received widespread acclaim in 1879 when his sculpture of Robert Burns was awarded the top prize amongst twenty-one competition entries. His marble statue became the centerpiece of the ornamental building constructed in Kay Park, Kilmarnock, Scotland.

== Description ==
The Burns Monument is composed of a bronze statue, a granite pedestal, and two bronze panels mounted to the pedestal.

=== Statue ===
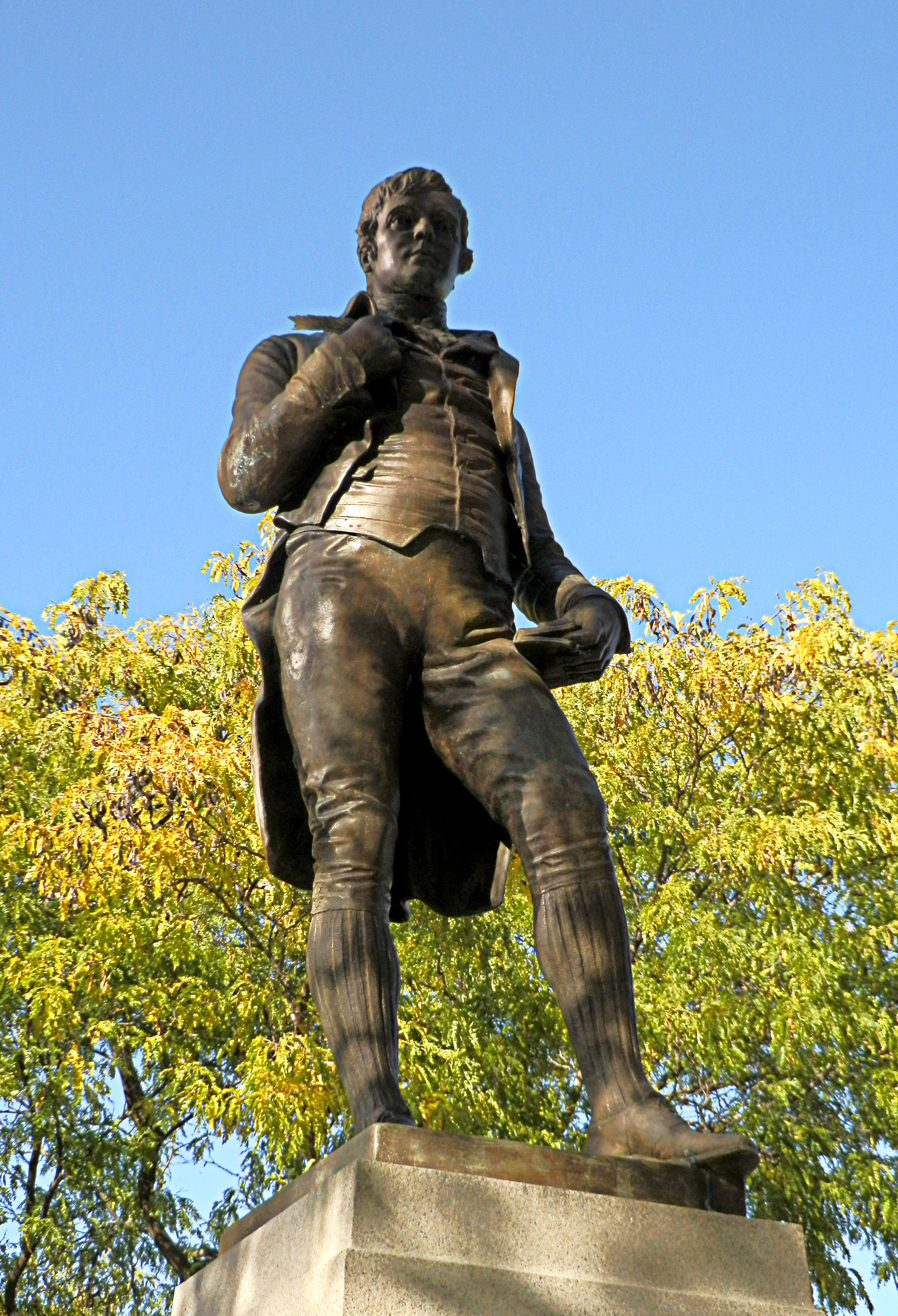
Robert Burns statue, Harold E. Hansen, photograph

The bronze figure represents the popular Scottish poet standing, facing south, with a notebook in one hand.The portrayal of Burns is reminiscent of paintings by Alexander Nasmyth showing the poet as a young man. Burns is dressed in a "claw-hammer" coat, knee breeches, vest, cravat, and woolen hose. In his left hand, Burns is holding a notebook with fingers in between the pages; in his right he holds a quill pen.

The granite pedestal has four faces aligned with the directions of the compass, with bronze panels reliefs installed on the western and eastern faces. The pedestal rests on a 30 ton (Note: Equivalent to approximately 27.2 metric tonnes.) concrete foundation.

=== Bronze panels ===
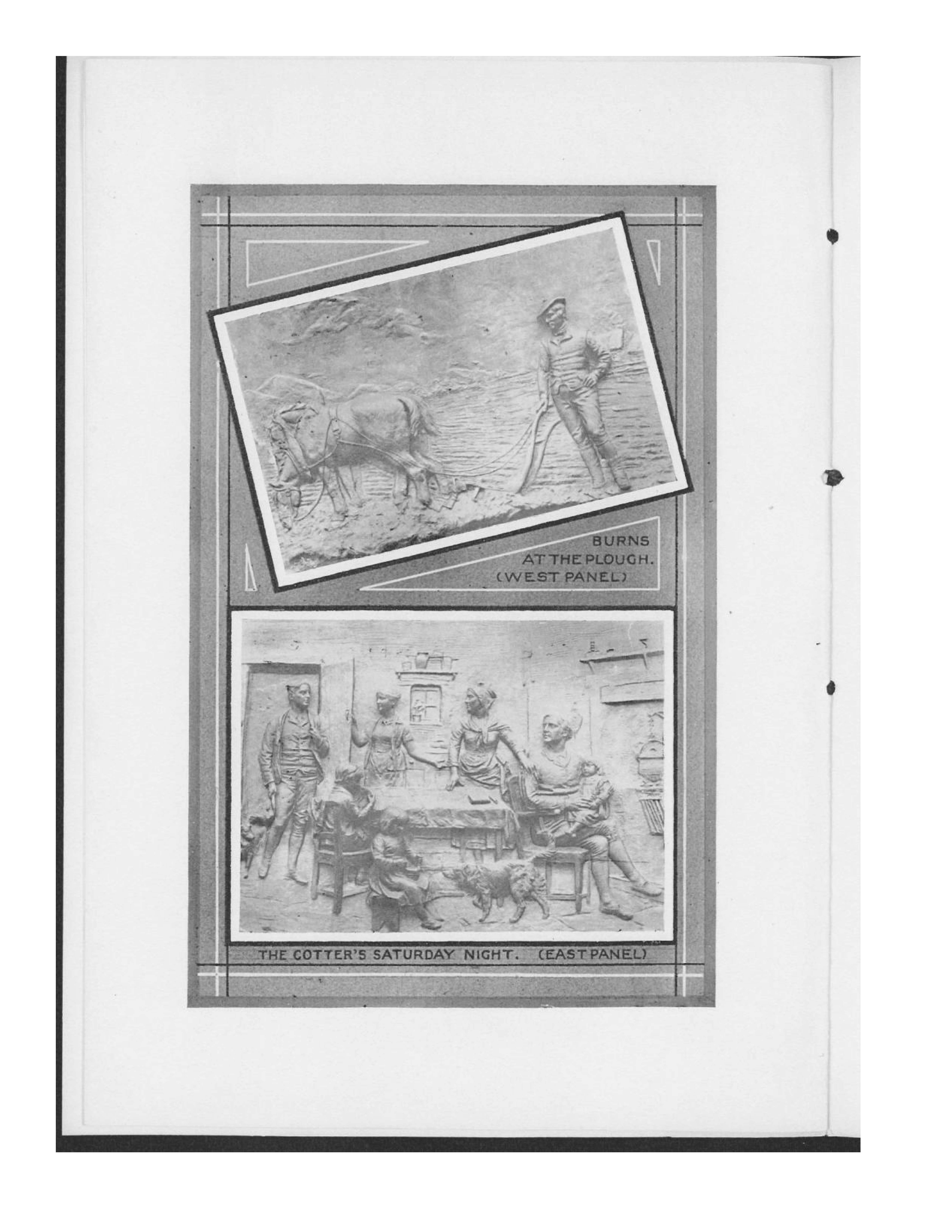
Bronze Reliefs, Milwaukee Robert Burns MonumentUpper: Burns at the Plough Lower: A Cotter's Saturday Night

The bronze panels on the Burns Monument are in the bas-relief style. The western panel, entitled Burns at the Plough, shows the poet resting his team of horses while plowing. The eastern panel, entitled A Cotter's Saturday Night, portrays the simple piety, warmth, and moral virtue of a Scottish peasant family's weekly gathering on the eve of the Sabbath.

=== Inscriptions ===
The southern inscription: ROBERT BURNS.

The northern inscription: THE GIFT OF JAMES ANDERSON BRYDEN A NATIVE OF SCOTLAND TO THE CITY OF HIS ADOPTION 1909.

Under the western panel: THE POETIC GENIUS OF MY COUNTRY FOUND ME AT THE PLOUGH AND THREW HER INSPIRING MANTLE OVER ME.

Under the eastern panel: FROM SCENES LIKE THESE OLD SCOTIA'S GRANDEUR SPRINGS.

=== Location ===
The Burns Monument is located in Burns Commons on the east side of Milwaukee, Wisconsin. It stands within a triangular park, referred to as the Burns Triangle, that is bounded by North Prospect Ave., East Knapp St., and North Franklin Pl. The location for the Burns statue was selected by James A. Bryden, Milwaukee City Engineer Charles J. Poetsch, Deputy Commissioner of the Public Works J. P. Sherer, Andrew Agnew, and the east division engineer.

== Donor ==
The Robert Burns Monument was donated to the City of Milwaukee by Mr. James Anderson Bryden (1833–1913). Bryden was born in 1833 (Note: The newspaper obituary reports a birthdate and year for Bryden that differ from those recorded in the Old Parish Birth Registers held by the National Records of Scotland.) on a small farm (Bankside) approximately 4 miles (6 km) south of the city of Lockerbie, in Dumfriesshire, Scotland.

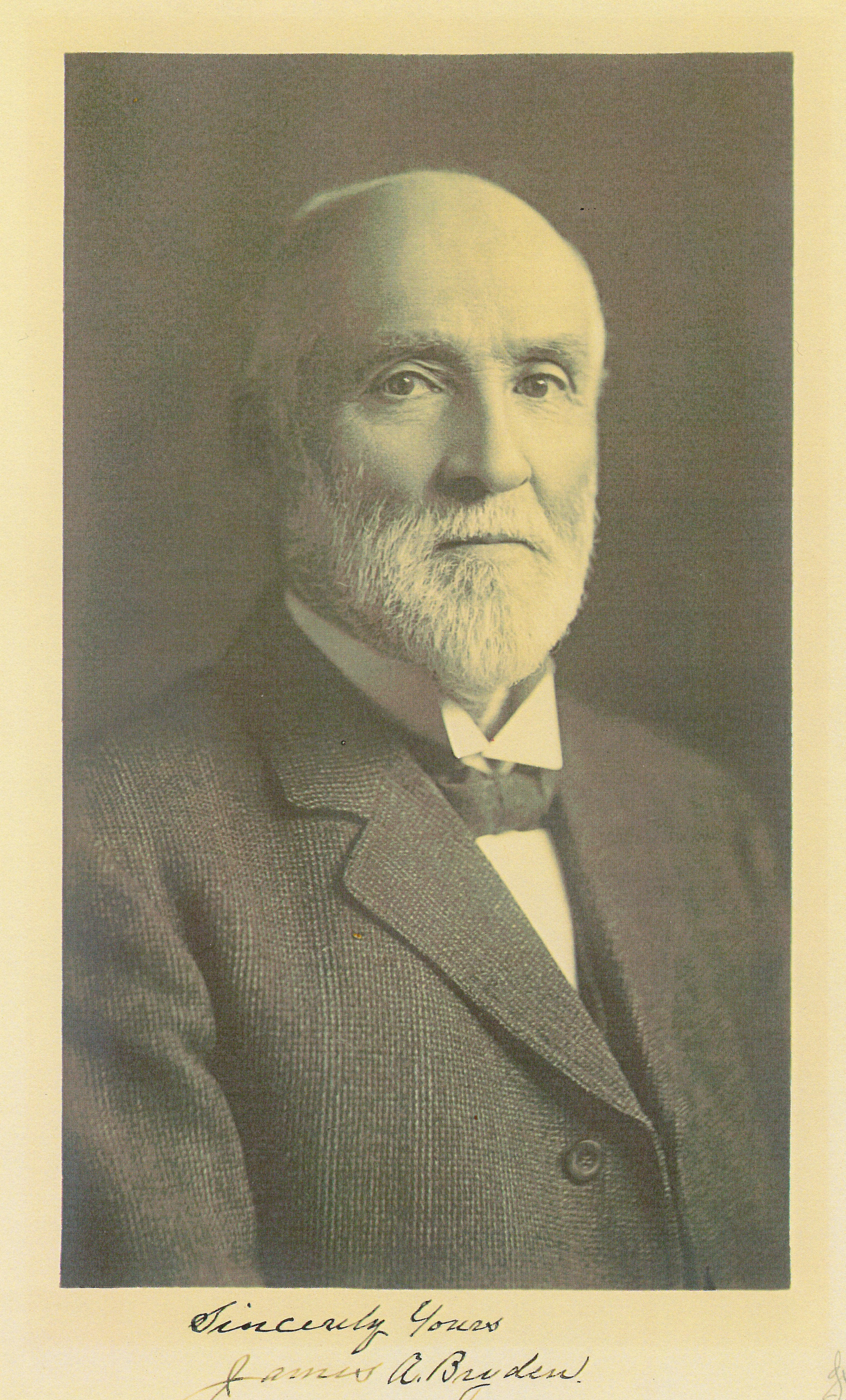
James A. Bryden (1833–1913), portrait photograph

The Bryden family emigrated to the United States when he was a young boy and they purchased farmland in Utica, New York. James Bryden moved to Milwaukee in 1857 and began working in the grain trade. Bryden founded his own company, J. A. Bryden & Co., and built a successful career as a grain merchant. In 1860, he became a member of the Chamber of Commerce and served for a time as Commissioner of the Chamber of Commerce.

Bryden was actively involved in civic and cultural life beyond his business interests. As Alderman for Milwaukee’s Seventh Ward in 1894, he contributed to the establishment and landscape design of Juneau Park. In 1895, Alderman Bryden proposed and championed a project to create a lake shore drive extending from Wisconsin Avenue past Lake Park—a roadway now known as Lincoln Memorial Drive. Bryden served as the skip of the gold medal–winning U.S. team at the International Bonspiel held in Montreal in February 1884. Bryden was a member of the Old Settlers' Club of Milwaukee County and was a longtime member and past president of the Saint Andrew's Society. Bryden was a member of the Phantom Club, (Note: The Phantom Club was a private literary and social society founded in 1894 by a group of men from Milwaukee and Waukesha, Wisconsin. The club served as a social and intellectual outlet for its members, who convened near Phantom Lake or other lakes in the Waukesha or Walworth County area.) a private literary club founded in 1894, and the Robert Burns statue and unveiling ceremony was documented extensively in the Phantom Club Papers Second Series published in 1910.

Bryden’s early years living on the family farm are said to have inspired his appreciation for the poetry of Robert Burns, who is affectionately known in Scotland as the “Ploughman Poet.” He was known for delivering Robert Burns’s Address to the Haggis at the Saint Andrew's Society annual banquet for 25 years with only one exception. Contemporary news reports noted that his favorite Burns poem was A Cotter’s Saturday Night. Bryden’s lifelong civic engagement and extensive contributions to the city continue to benefit Milwaukee today.

To understand why the Bryden donated the Burns Monument to the City of Milwaukee, it is helpful to consider the remarks delivered at its unveiling in 1909 by Andrew D. Agnew, a prominent Milwaukee lawyer and the chairman of the unveiling ceremony. Mr. Agnew described the monument’s origin as the fulfillment of a long-held aspiration shared by several prominent Scottish-American residents of the city:

“The project of erecting a statue of Burns in our city had its inception many years ago with a small coterie of well-known Scotchmen, among whom were Alexander Mitchell, John Johnston, John A. Mitchell, John P. McGregor, William P. McLaren, and James A. Bryden. But the hand of death intervened before the matter took debate shape, and Mr. Bryden found himself the sole survivor. Not wishing the project to fail, he determined to personally carry it through. His first intention was to provide for the statue by legacy, but he finally concluded that he would himself see the consummation of this long-cherished desire. He accordingly commissioned William Grant Stevens, the eminent sculptor of Edinburgh, to produce a replica of his famous statue of Burns.”

— Andrew Agnew, Milwaukee Journal June 26, 1909

This passage highlights both the communal origins of the idea and the personal commitment of James A. Bryden, who ensured the project's completion and gifted the monument to the City of Milwaukee.

== Unveiling ceremony ==
Complete program: Exercises of the Robert Burns Monument Erected by James A. Bryden

The unveiling ceremony for the Burns Monument was held on Saturday, June 26, 1909, at 2pm. The day's events began as a crowd assembled at the Plankinton House and moved in procession to the Burns Monument, led by the Caledonian Pipe Band. By the time the group arrived at the statue for the unveiling, it was estimated that 2,000 people had assembled to watch the unveiling ceremony.

An invocation was given to the attendees by Rev. Frederick Edwards. The Burns song, "There Was a Lad Was Born in Kyle" was performed by the Lyric Glee Club. The statue was unveiled by Miss Juneau Theiline McGee, the great-great granddaughter of Solomon Juneau — the first mayor of Milwaukee.

Joseph V. Quarles gave an eloquent speech on Robert Burns and concluded with the official Presentation of the Burns Monument to the City of Milwaukee.

"Mr. Mayor, in behalf of James A. Bryden, our neighbor and friend, I have the honor to tender this monument to the people of Milwaukee. Be pleased to accept it in their behalf and I doubt not that they will see to it that it is suitably protected and maintained."

Mayor David Stuart Rose accepted the monument on behalf of the city. The Lyric Glee Club sang another famous Burns song, "Scots Wha Ha'e", for the audience. After the musical interlude, rhetorical addresses were given to the audience by John G. Gregory and Hon. Ogden H. Fethers. General Arthur MacArthur Jr gave an address to the audience about Scottish characteristics and poetry.

Then, after calls from the crowd to hear from the donor, James Bryden spoke to the assembled audience.

Mr. Chairman, Ladies and Gentlemen: It gives me great pleasure to greet this large gathering of our citizens and our friends from Wisconsin and other States. You are assembled to witness the unveiling of a statue in memory of the ploughboy poet, Robert Burns, whose songs are sung in every land and in every tongue. His writings are dear to all Scotsmen, wherever found. It was my good fortune to be born in Scotland, and to come to this country with my father's large family when I was five years of age. My father bought a farm near Utica, New York, and I remained on that farm until I was past twenty-one years of age, when I came to Milwaukee, in 1857. My business life has been passed in this beautiful and prosperous city. It gives me great honor to present to the City of Milwaukee this monument of Robert Burns, the world's great poet, the poet of humanity.

— James A. Bryden, Speech at Unveiling Ceremony for the Robert Burns statue in Milwaukee, Phantom Club Papers, Second Series, 1910

The exercises concluded with the audience and Lyric Glee Club singing the popular and well-known Robert Burns song, "Auld Lang Syne".

== Conservation ==
James Bryden was President of the Saint Andrew's Society of the City of Milwaukee from 1898 to 1899. The members of the Saint Andrew's Society have helped celebrate and care for the Burns Monument over the many decades since James Bryden donated it to Milwaukee.

Given the age of the Burns Monument, maintenance is required periodically to clean the statue of superficial corrosion and restore the protective coating. An editorial newspaper article in 1987 documented in detail the deteriorated state of several statues in Milwaukee, including the Robert Burns statue.

In 1994, the Saint Andrew's Society of the City of Milwaukee, the Greater Milwaukee Committee, the Burns Club of Milwaukee, and other private donors funded cleaning and restoration of the Burns Monument. The respected monument conservator Douglas D. Kwart was hired to perform the statue conservation work. In 1994, Phase I of the conservation process removed corrosion from the statue, repaired water damage, and applied a brown-red lacquer coating. A formal rededication ceremony was held on August 28, 1994. In attendance were members of the Milwaukee County Government, Parks Department, Saint Andrew's Society, and the local Scottish community. In 1996, Phase II of the project added sidewalks and street lighting to the area surrounding the monument.

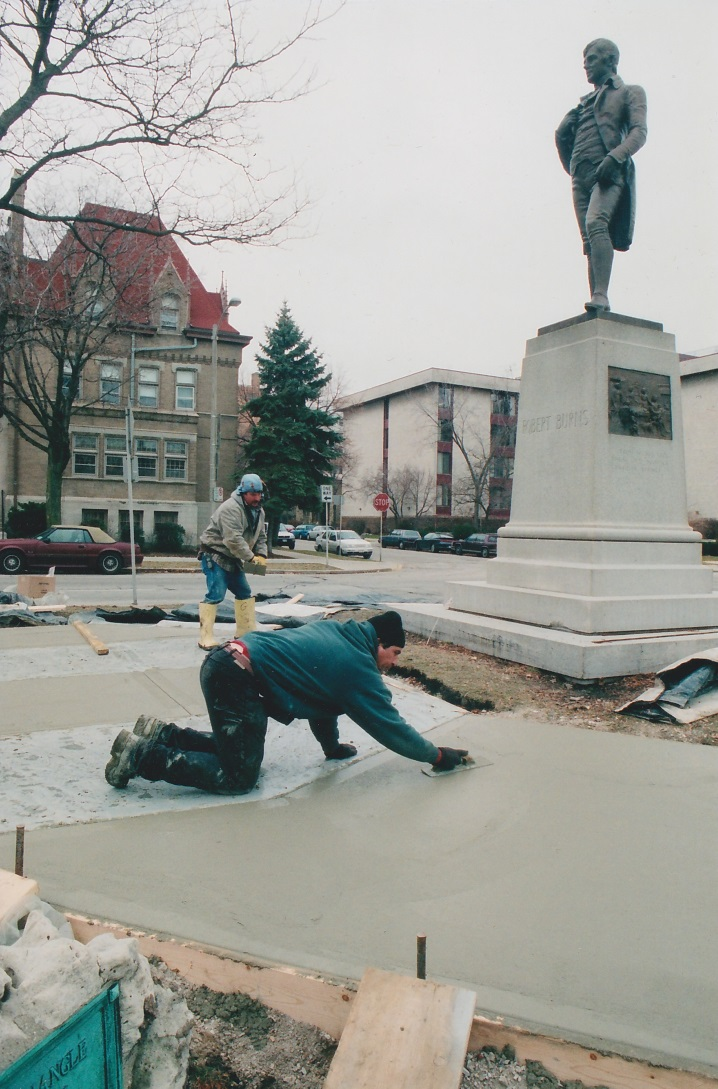
Burns Commons South, concrete sidewalk construction, 1996

== Burns Triangle landscaping ==
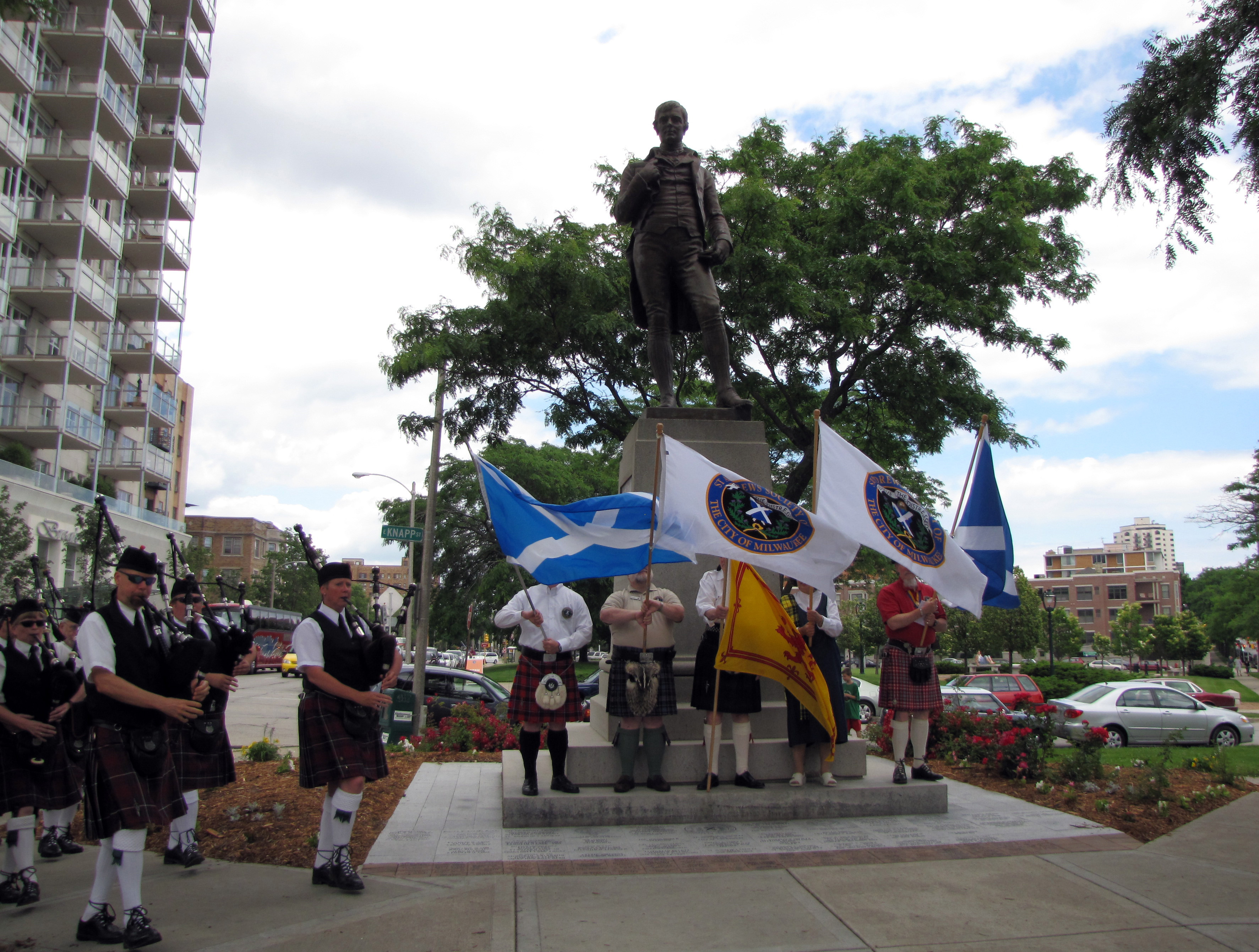
2010 Burns Monument Rededication Ceremony

In 2010, the Saint Andrew's Society, in collaboration with the Milwaukee County Parks, organized private donations to fund and install a walkway of commemorative engraved granite pavers around the base of the Burns Monument. With the walkway in place, visitors to the statue can view the monument engravings and bronze panels up-close without walking through the rose bushes or flower beds.

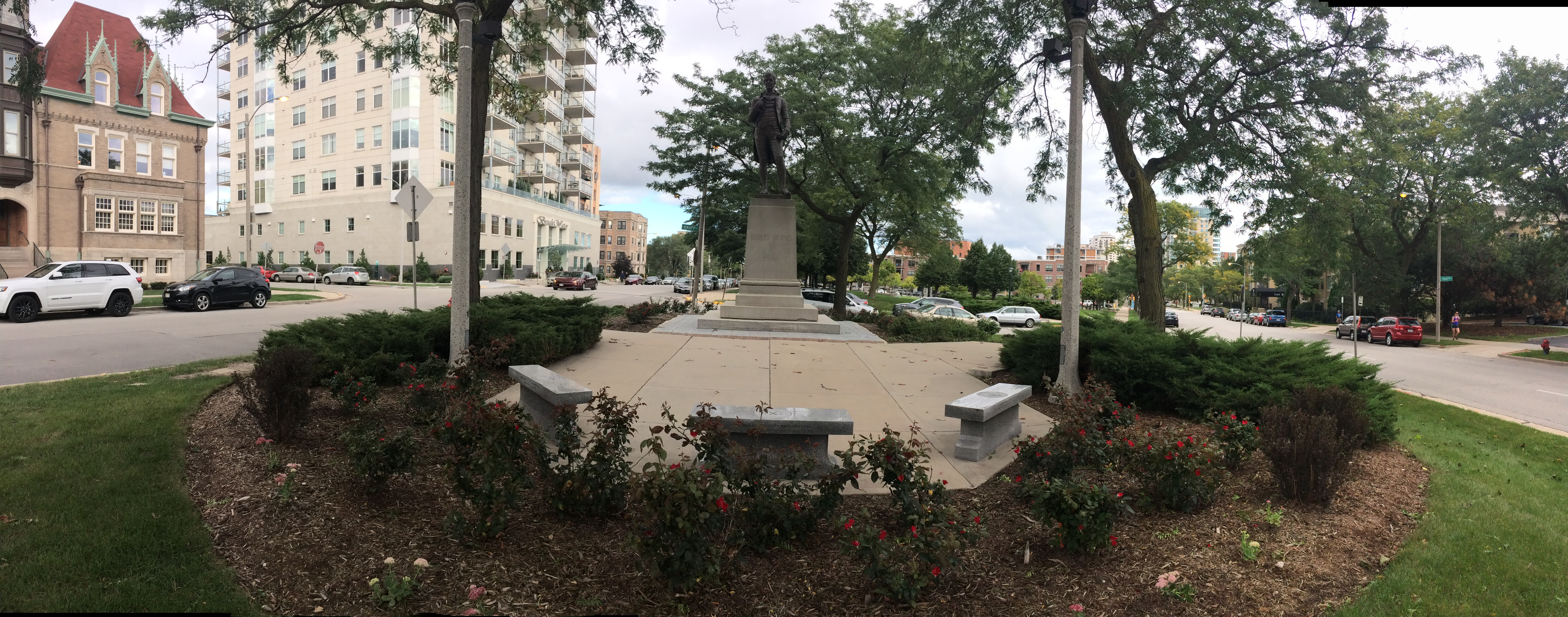
The Burns Monument in 2018

In 2013, granite benches were privately donated and installed in the Burns Triangle, with the approval from the Milwaukee County Parks officials, to allow visitors to sit and view the statue. The granite benches are engraved with selections of Burns's poetry.

== Wreath-laying ceremonies ==
A wreath-laying celebration is held annually at the monument on the Sunday nearest to Robert Burns's birthday. Poetry fans, Burnsians, and members of the Saint Andrew's Society gather in celebration at the Burns Monument to recite poetry, play the bagpipes, and sing songs.

== See also ==
- Burns Commons
- Burns Monument, Kilmarnock
- List of Robert Burns memorials
- Robert Burns Memorial Statue (Fredericton) - Another statue of Robert Burns designed by William Grant Stevenson
- William Grant Stevenson
- William Wallace Statue, Aberdeen
