= Kay Park =

Urban park in East Ayrshire, Scotland

Coordinates: 55°36′46″N 4°29′13″W

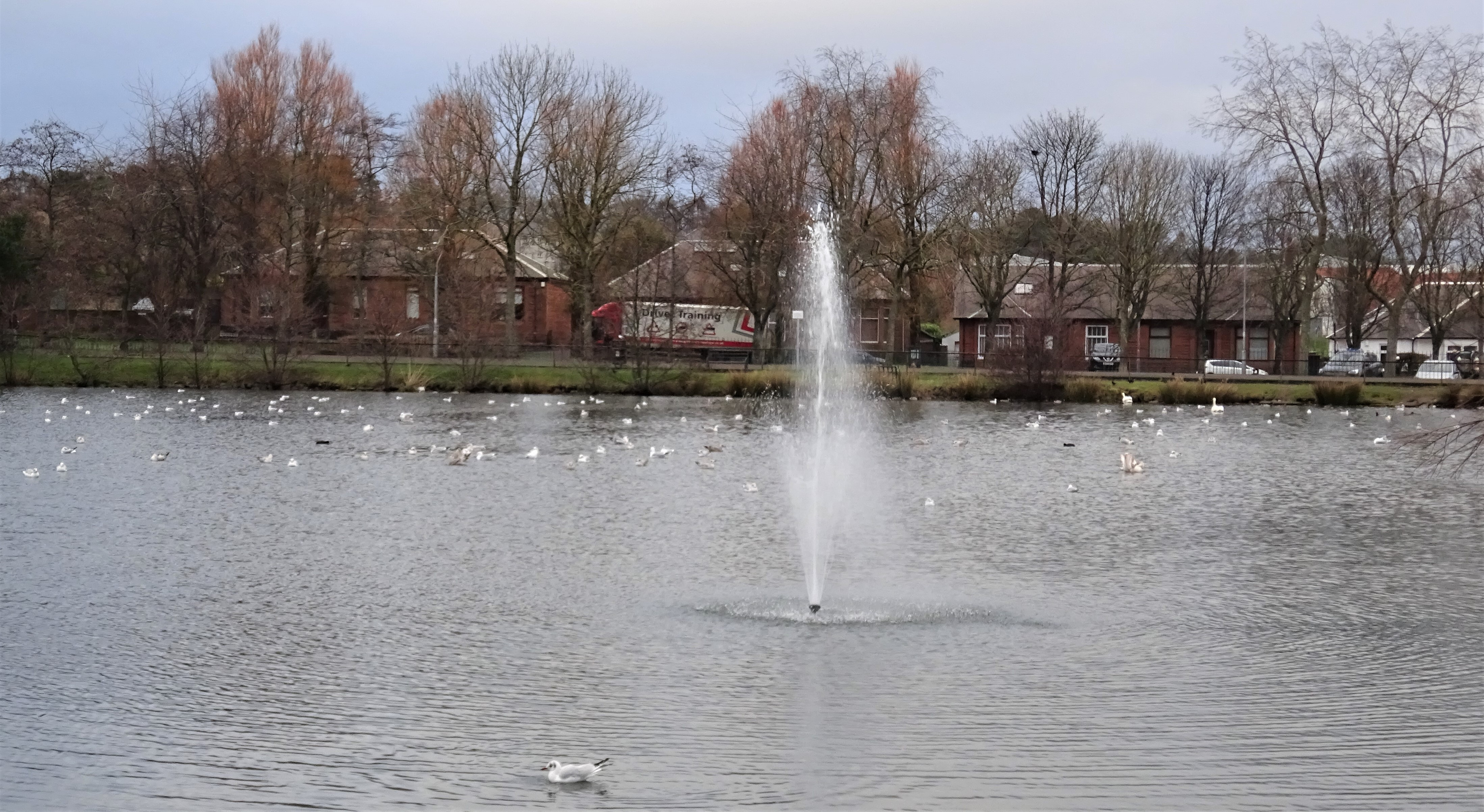
Pond and fountain in the centre of Kay Park

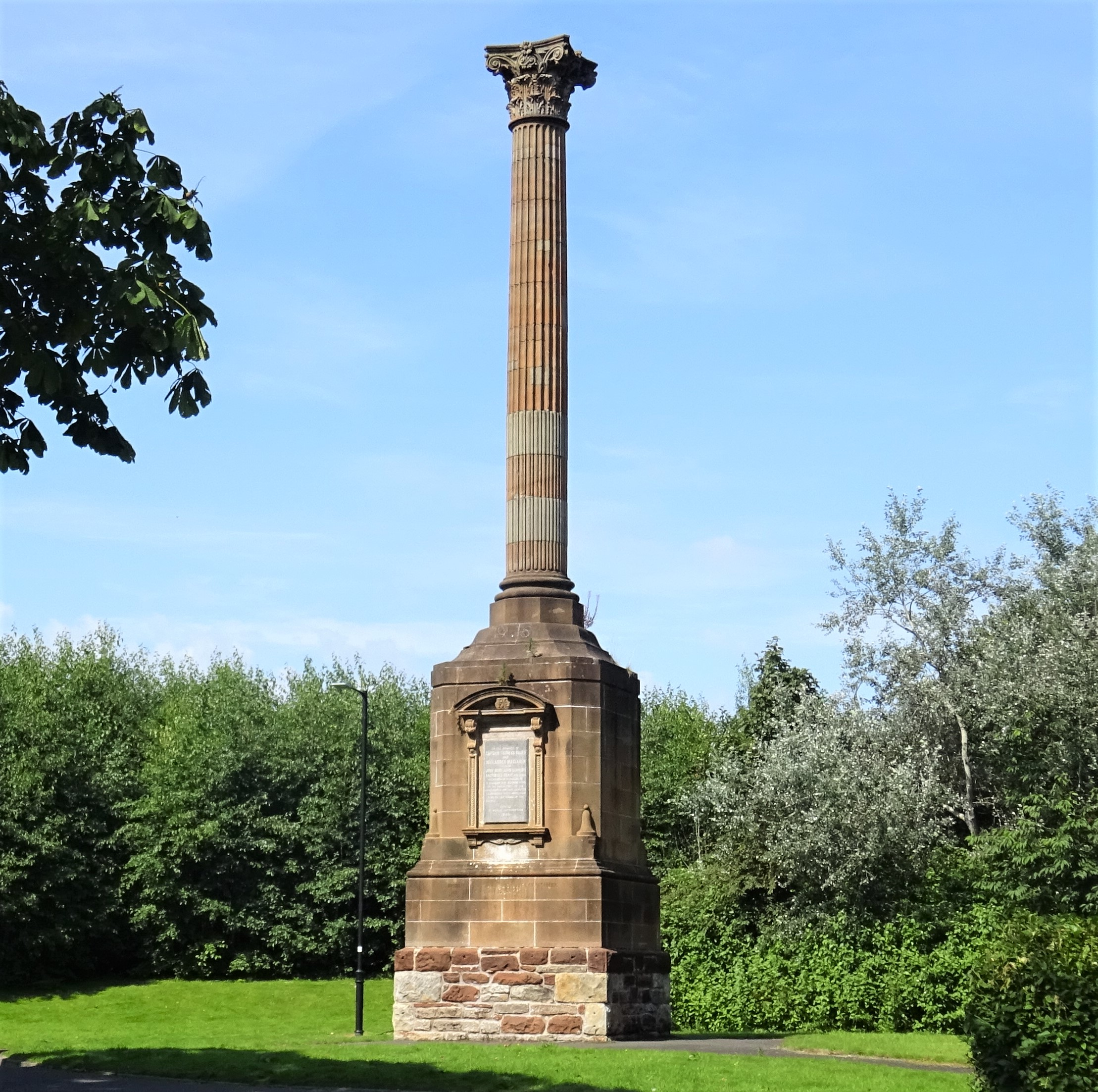
A monument to protesters for parliamentary reform

Kay Park is a 30 acres (12 ha) park in Kilmarnock, East Ayrshire, Scotland. The money for its purchase was bequeathed to the town of Kilmarnock by former native insurance broker Alexander Kay who died in Glasgow in January 1866.

== History ==
=== Location ===
The location of the park was determined by the town council and the Kay Trustees after various proposed sites were examined and the land was purchased from the Duke of Portland. The park opened on 9 August 1879 with great pomp and circumstance. It is the home of the Burns Monument, a large monument to poet Robert Burns. The Burns Monument was badly damaged by fire in November 2004, however it was later redeveloped to provide a marriage suite, registration service and local history research service.

=== Features ===
There was formerly a miniature golf course, a few drinking fountains, pubs, boating in the pond and a band stand on the site, but now only a single non-functional fountain remains. The Kilmarnock-Dumfries railway line passes the park, near the top entrance to the park near the new Burns Monument Centre, there is a Corinthian column, erected in memory of a group of Parliamentary reformers who protested here in 1816. The monument was unveiled by Lord Rosebery in 1885.

== Burns Monument ==
The Burns Monument Centre provides registration services and here you can carry out local and family history research in its family history centre and local history library. It also still contains part of the McKie Collection of Bursiana that the centre was originally purchased by the council to house after it purchased James McKie's collection.

== See also ==
- Kilmarnock
