= Archie Stevenson =

American politician and lawyer (1858–1922)

- Portrait of Stevenson

Member of the Colorado Senate
- In office 1883–1886
- Constituency: Pitkin, Gunnison, Montrose, and Delta counties

Personal details
- Born: Archibald McNichol Stevenson; February 17, 1858 Rothesay, Scotland
- Died: November 27, 1922 (aged 64) Denver, Colorado, U.S.
- Party: Republican; Silver Republican
- Spouse: Mary Abbey (m. 1878)
- Children: 2
- Occupation: Politician; lawyer

Archibald McNichol Stevenson (February 17, 1858 – November 27, 1922) was an American politician and lawyer from Colorado. He served in the Colorado Senate from 1883 to 1886.

== Early life ==
Archibald McNichol Stevenson was born on February 17, 1858, in Rothesay, Scotland, to Elizabeth (née McNichol) and Peter Campbell Stevenson. His father served in the American Civil War. He came to the United States when he was less than one year old and the family settled in Vernon County, Wisconsin. He attended public and private schools in Wisconsin, including a high school in Viroqua, Wisconsin, and Houghton's Private Academy. He read law in Oshkosh and Viroqua. In 1876, he was recommended by the examining committee for admission to the bar, but was refused due to his youth. He then went to Omaha, Nebraska, and later moved to Grand Island, Nebraska, in the same year and was admitted to the bar in Nebraska.

== Career ==
Stevenson practiced law in Grand Island and Sidney, Nebraska, for three years. In 1879, he moved to Colorado and settled in Pitkin, Colorado. He began practice law in Colorado in 1880. He was a lawyer for different corporations. He had a law partnership with Frankey.

Stevenson was elected to the Colorado Senate, representing Pitkin, Gunnison, Montrose, and Delta counties, in 1882 and served for four years. He served as chairman of the judiciary committee. Afterward, he moved to Gunnison, Colorado, during the Denver, Leadville and Gunnison Railway boom. He was a leader in the Republican Party, but later became affiliated with the Silver Republican Party. Stevenson and Henry M. Teller withdrew from the 1896 convention under the instruction of the Colorado Republican Party, following the adoption of an anti-silver platform. He later returned to the Republican Party.

Stevenson represented Colorado in the Republican National Conventions from 1900 to 1908. He served twice as chairman of the executive committee of the Republican State Central Committee. In 1909, President William Howard Taft sent Stevenson to Japan to settle difference between American citizens and the Japanese government on land concessions in Korea. In 1911, he refused an appointment as ambassador of Argentina. During the 1912 convention, he was credited with keeping Colorado as a part of the regular convention and renominating Taft. He also attended the 1916 and 1920 conventions.

== Personal life ==
In 1878, Stevenson married Mary Abbey of Viroqua, Wisconsin. They had one daughter and one son, A. M. Jr. He had two nicknames, "Big Steve" and "Angel Archie". He was a member of the Denver Club, the Masons, and the Colorado Bar Association.

Stevenson died of double pneumonia on November 27, 1922, at his home on Grant Street in Denver.
