= William Grant Stevenson =

Scottish sculptor and portrait painter (1849–1919)

William Grant Stevenson RSA
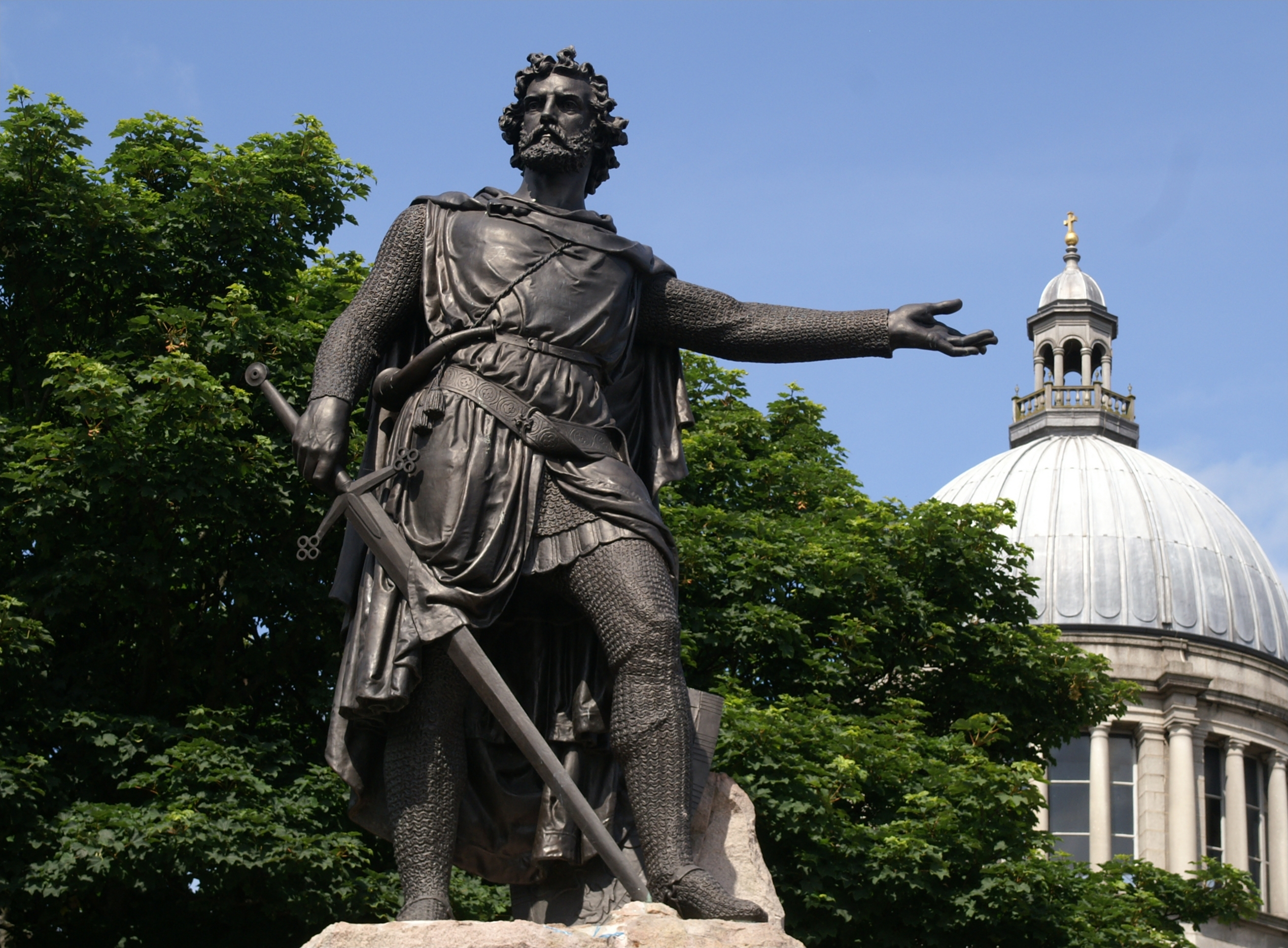
- Statue of Sir William Wallace in Aberdeen with the dome of St Mark's behind
- Born: 7 March 1849; Ratho, Midlothian Scotland
- Died: 6 May 1919 (aged 70); Edinburgh
- Known for: Sculpture, portrait painting

William Grant Stevenson, RSA (7 March 1849 – 6 May 1919) was a Scottish sculptor and portrait painter.

== Life and work ==
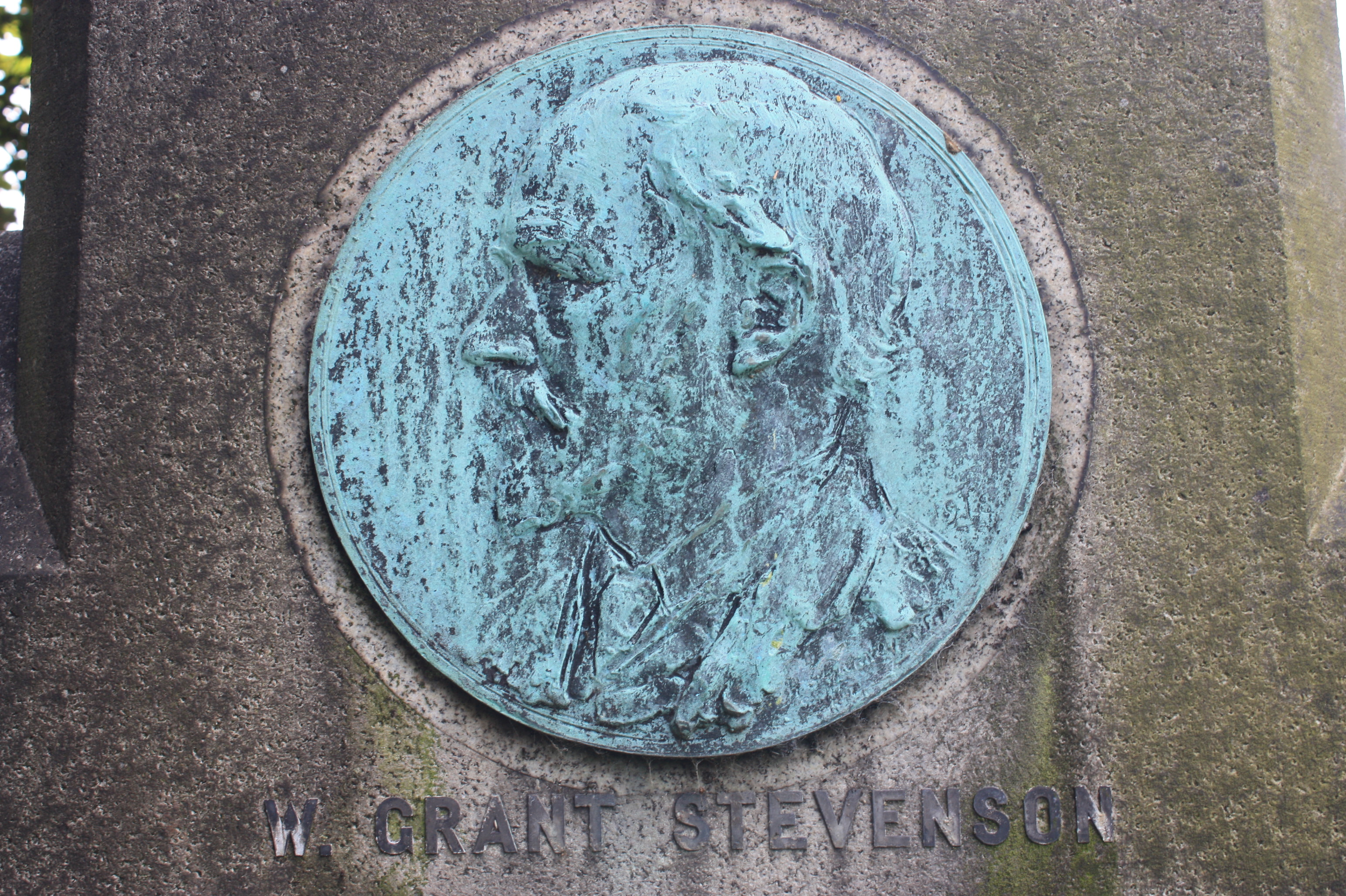
Memorial to William Grant Stevenson, by Henry Snell Gamley

Stevenson was born in Ratho in Midlothian on 7 March 1849. His parents were William Stevenson and Margaret Kay Stevenson. His elder brother, David Watson Stevenson (1842–1904), was also a sculptor and an elected member of the Royal Scottish Academy.

Stevenson is most famous for his colossal bronze figure of Sir William Wallace, which stands on a high plinth of roughly hewn pink granite overlooking Union Terrace Gardens in Aberdeen.

Stevenson was an admirer of Robert Burns's work and created several sculptures of the poet. His marble statue of Burns serves as the centerpiece of the Burns Monument in Kilmarnock. Stevenson was also commissioned to produce bronze statues of Burns for monuments located in:

- Denver, Colorado (City Park)
- Chicago, Illinois (Garfield Park)
- Fredericton, New Brunswick (The Green)
- Milwaukee, Wisconsin (Burns Commons)

Stevenson had his studio at 13 Dalry Road and lived nearby at 63 Haymarket Terrace.

His public artwork contributions include three figures to the Scott Monument on Princes Street in Edinburgh: Caleb Balderstone, Peter Peebles, and The Abbess. The three are somewhat lost within the huge complexity of the building, and its total of 68 figurative statues.

Stevenson also immortalized great figures of his time. One of his subjects was James Carnegie, 9th Earl of Southesk (1827–1905). In the portrayal the Earl is wearing his collar as a Knight of the Order of the Thistle, the highest honour which the monarch can bestow in Scotland. The image is an uncompromising image of a man who was considered a powerful and romantic figure who had travelled the wilds of 19th century Canada.

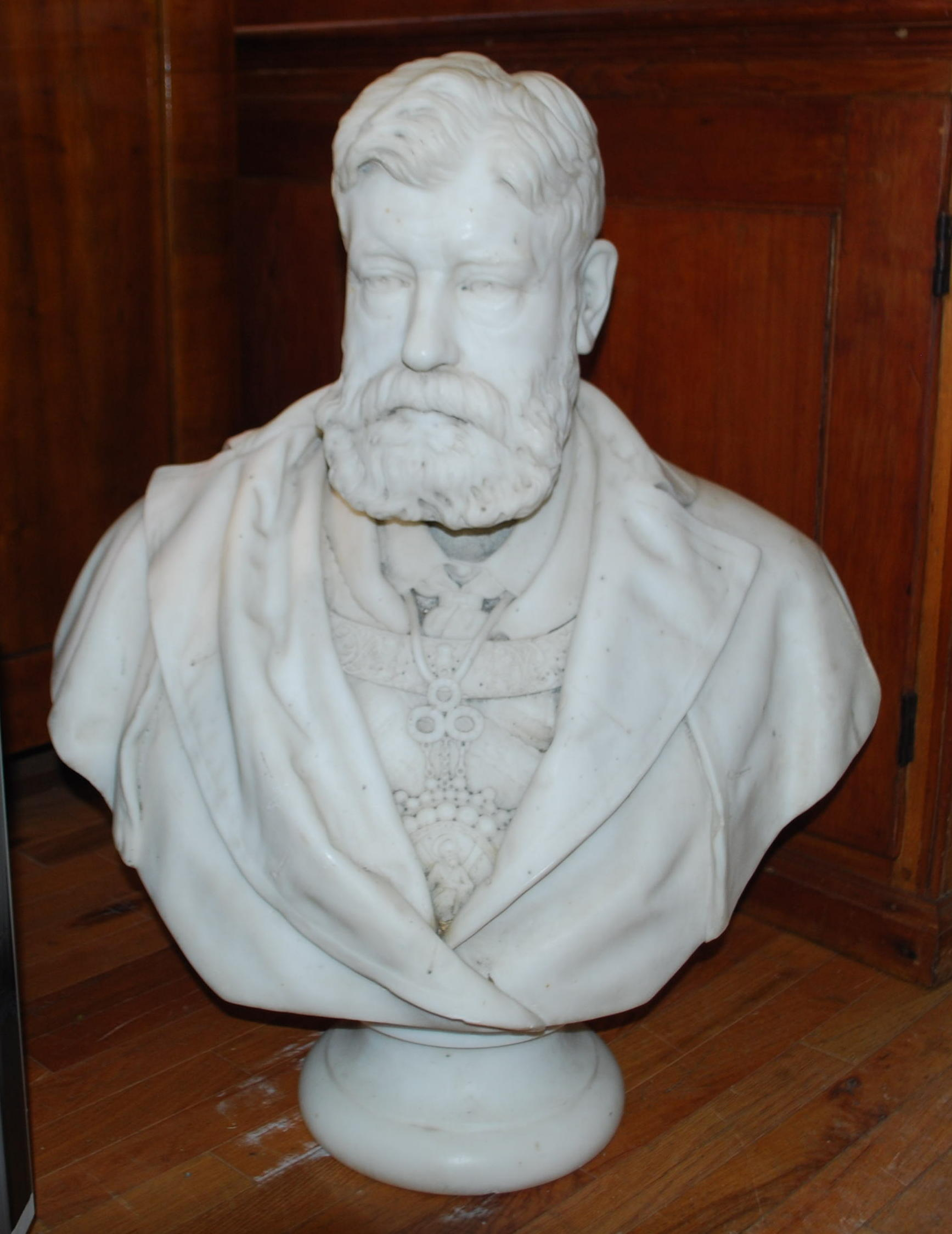
Stevenson's bust of the Earl of Southesk

In his later life Stevenson's studio was at 4 Belford Road near Dean Bridge. He lived at 8 Osborne Terrace.

He was selected for The Royal Scottish Academy in 1896.

He published the book Wee Johnnie Paterson in 1915.

Stevenson died on 6 May 1919, aged 70. He is buried with his brother, who preceded him in death by fifteen years, in Grange Cemetery in Edinburgh. The stone lies in the south-west section of the original cemetery and carries a bronze portrait of William by Henry Snell Gamley. His wife Jane Dickson (1855–1927) is also buried with him.

A painting of William Grant Stevenson by Charles Martin Hardie is held in the National Gallery of Scotland.
