= Burns Monument, Kilmarnock =

Monument in Kilmarnock, East Ayrshire, Scotland

Coordinates: 55°36′46″N 4°29′23″W

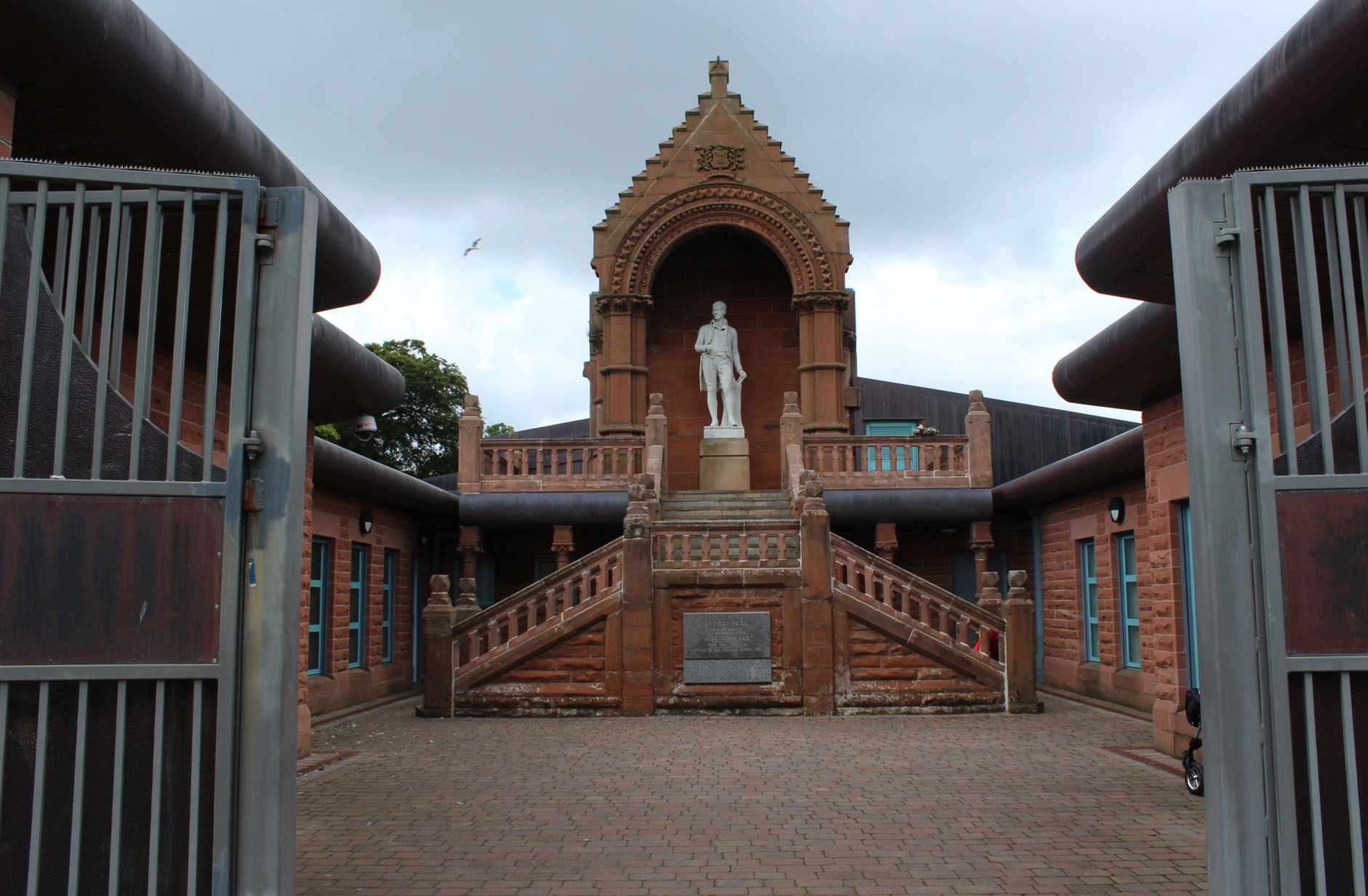
The Burns Monument

The Burns Monument in Kay Park, Kilmarnock, Scotland, commemorates the poet Robert Burns (1759–1796). It is located at an elevated position within Kay Park, to the east of Kilmarnock Town Centre. The monument was opened in 1879, and is a category B listed building. In 2004, following years of neglect by the local council, fire destroyed most of the building. What was left of the monument was incorporated into the new Burns Monument Centre which opened in 2009. In 2010 the centre was shortlisted for the Carbuncle Cup award run by Building Design.

== History ==
Kilmarnock has many links with Burns; the first edition of his work was printed here in 1786, by John Wilson, a local printer. Of this first edition only 612 copies were printed, and copies of this rare book are now known as Kilmarnock Editions.

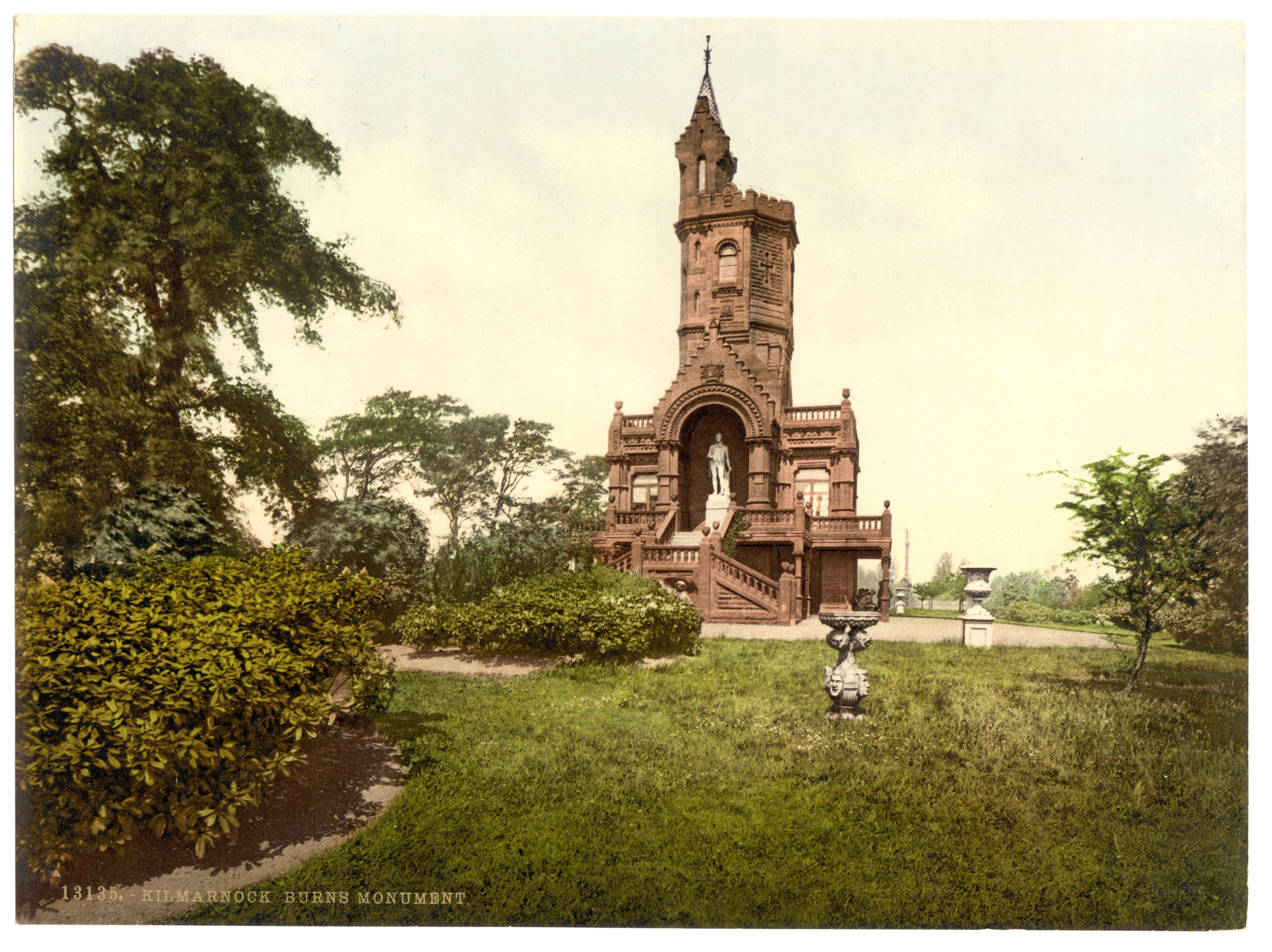
The original monument, circa 1900

On Burns Night 1877, a movement to erect a memorial in Kilmarnock was begun. Subscriptions came in so quickly that the organisers decided to investigate the possibility of a memorial building as well as a marble statue. In October, a design by local architect Robert S Ingram was accepted by the committee, and he began the preparation of drawings. In December, a design competition for the statue attracted 21 entries, and William Grant Stevenson of Edinburgh was judged the winner. The foundation stone was laid on 14 September 1878, by R. W. Cochran-Patrick of Woodside, Depute Provincial Grand Master for Ayrshire.

In August 1879, the 40 acres (16 ha) Kay Park was opened, with the completed Burns Monument as its focus. The statue was officially unveiled by Colonel Charles Alexander of Ballochmyle MP on 9 August. The monument cost around £1,500, with another £800 spent on the statue.

The design of the monument has been described as "an eclectic fusion of Scots Baronial, neo-Gothic and Italianate, with a dash of Baroque and a hint of Romanesque." The original building comprised a two-storey T-plan museum, topped by an 80 feet (24 m) high octagonal tower and spire, with the life-size white marble statue of Burns by Stevenson in a porch at the front. The tower offered wide views across Kilmarnock. Ingram, a prolific local architect, considered the monument to be his finest work.

== Neglect and new building ==
Following years of neglect by the local council the monument was badly damaged by arson in November 2004. The two storey museum section, at the rear, and the semi-octagonal two-storey tower collapsed, leaving only the front stairs, porch, part of the ground floor outer walls and two of the main internal walls.

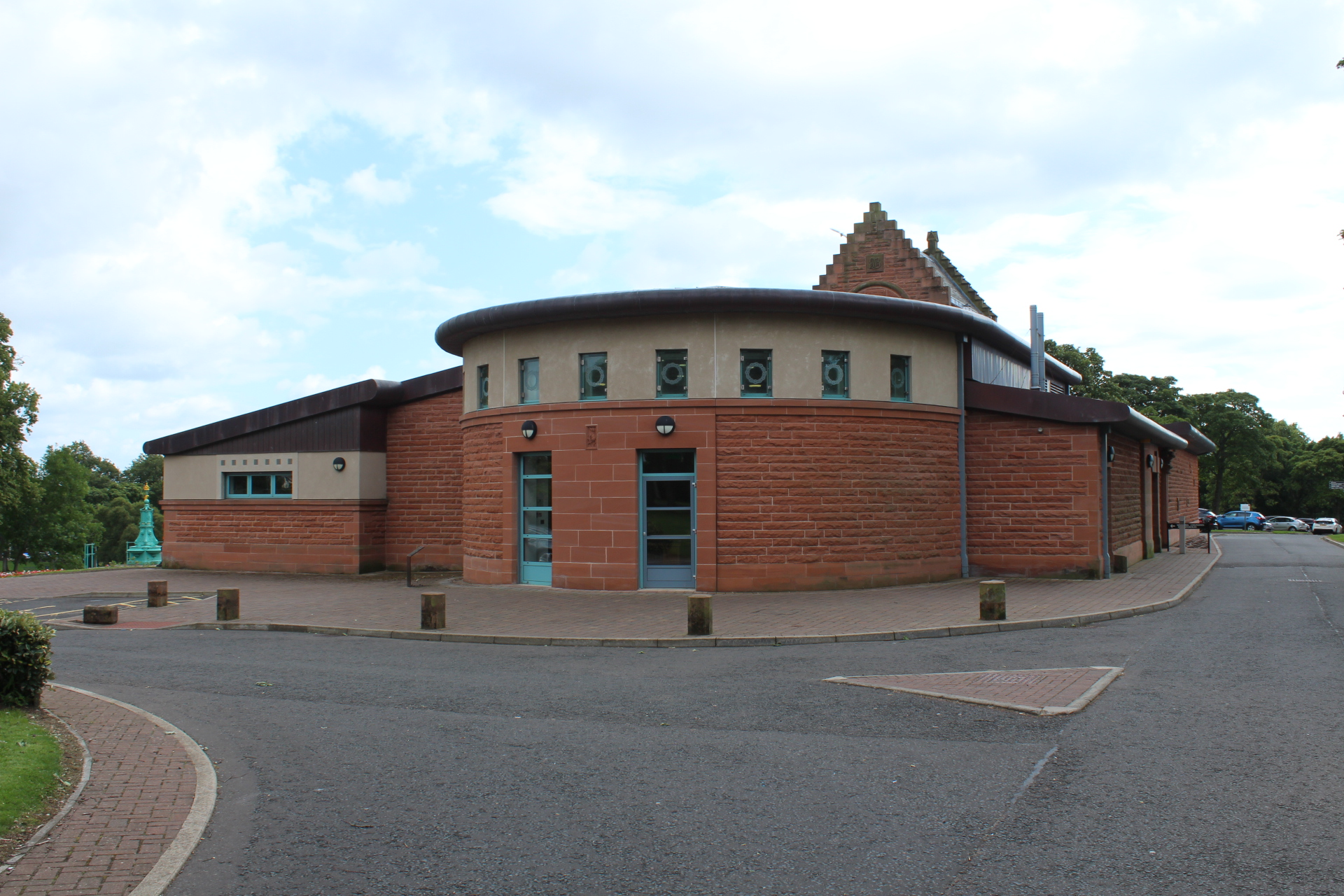
The redeveloped extension

Planning permission was granted in September 2006 for the partial re-instatement of the Burns Monument, with an extension to provide a marriage suite, registration service and archive service. The extension, designed by East Ayrshire Council architects, envelopes the remaining staircase and portico, which houses the statue of Robert Burns, and provides a courtyard setting with the statue of Burns and the remaining section of the original monument as a focal point to the northern elevation of the courtyard. The £5m Burns Monument Centre was eventually opened in May 2009 by then-First Minister Alex Salmond, as Scotland's first purpose-built genealogy centre.

In July 2010, it was announced that the rebuilt Centre was one of six buildings nominated for the annual Carbuncle Cup, given to the "ugliest building in the UK completed in the last 12 months." The Carbuncle Cup is given by Building Design magazine, based on nominations from the public. The nominator of the Burns Monument Centre described it as a "forced, clumpy monstrosity with pointlessly random rooves".

== See also ==
- List of Robert Burns memorials
- sculptor William Grant Stevenson
