= Schnier =

Schnier is a surname. Notable people with the surname include:

- Al Schnier (born 1968), American guitarist
- Hannes Schnier (born 1977), Austrian darts player
- Jacques Schnier (1898–1988), Romanian-born American artist, educator, author, and engineer
