= Graceada Park =

Park in Stanislaus County, California

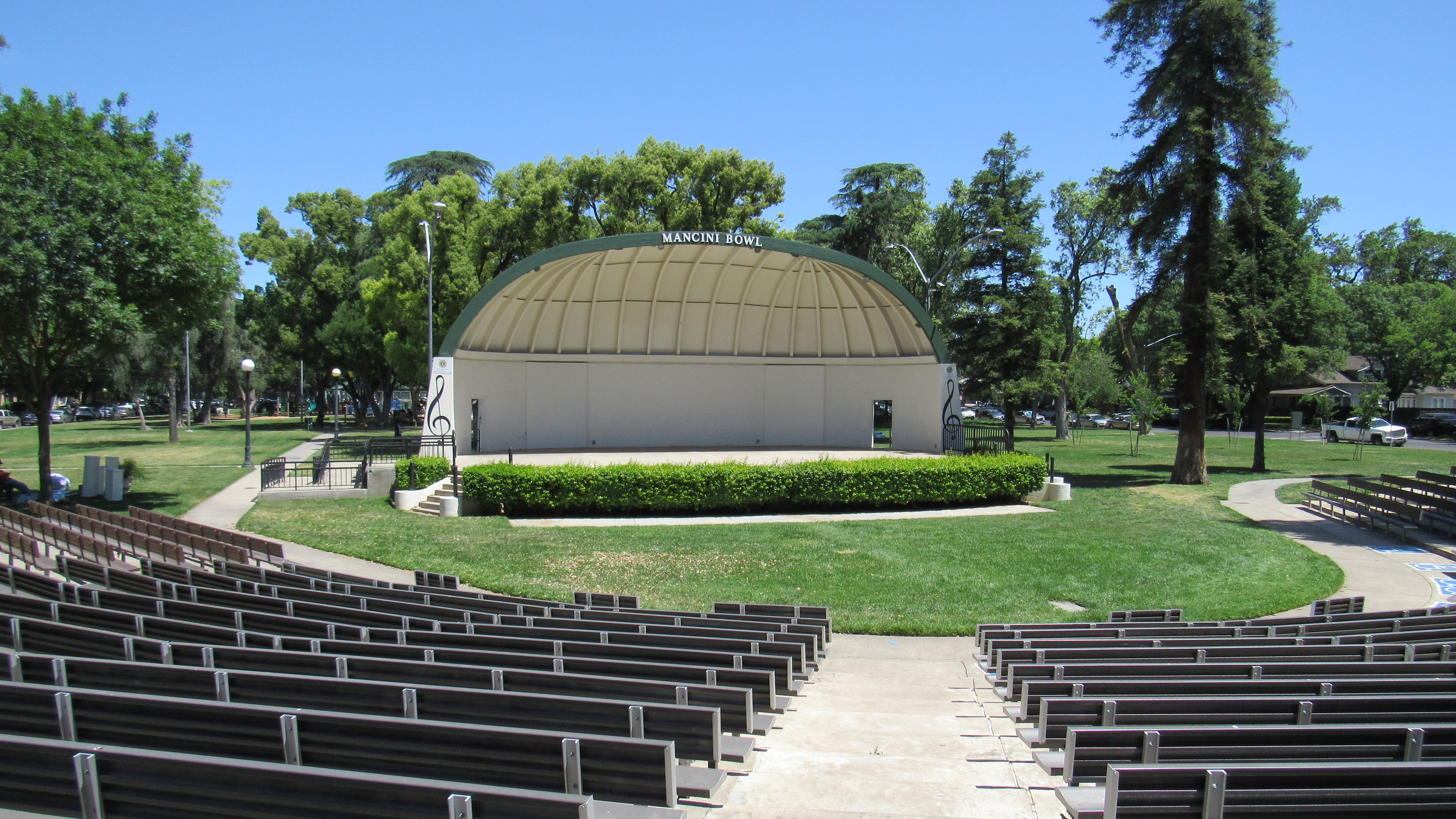
- The Mancini Music Bowl at Graceada Park
- Interactive map of Graceada Park
- Type: Urban park
- Location: Modesto, California, U.S.
- Coordinates: 37°38′50″N 120°59′53″W
- Area: 8.36 acres (3.38 ha; 0.01306 mi^{2}; 0.0338 km^{2})
- Elevation: 89 ft (27 m)
- Established: April 4, 1907
- Designer: John McLaren
- Etymology: "Graceada" is a combination of the names "Grace" and "Ada," referring to Grace Beard and Ada Wisecarver.
- Operator: City of Modesto Parks, Recreation and Neighborhoods Department
- Status: Open year-round
- Website: https://modestogov.com/2809/Graceada-Community-Park

Graceada Park (/ˈɡreɪseɪdʌ/ GRACE-AIDA) is an urban park located at 401 Needham Street in Modesto, California, and is the city's first and oldest park. The park is rectangular, being three blocks in height and one block in length. It was designed by John McLaren, the designer of Golden Gate Park in San Francisco, and was dedicated on April 4, 1907. Graceada Park has been registered as an official historic landmark by the City of Modesto Landmark Preservation Commission and since its founding has been a focal-point of community activity and engagement in Modesto.

== History ==
=== The Women's Improvement Club ===
One of the most productive early civic organizations in Modesto was the Women's Improvement Club of Modesto (which later became the Modesto Garden Club), established on April 14, 1906 with the objective of enhancing and beautifying the city. At the onset the club had forty-two members.

The development of parks in Modesto was initiated by the club. Previous to their help in park development, the only semblance of a park in the city was a small plot of ground on I Street where trees were planted for shade. Had the women's club been less insistent, the land of what is now Graceada Park would likely have been absorbed by the city within a year, and buildings placed on it.

=== Land donation ===
In 1906, two wealthy land developers, Thomas Kennan (T. K.) Beard and Thomas P. (T. P.) Wisecarver, donated twelve acres or three blocks of land to the women's club in what was then the northern part of Modesto, for the purpose of establishing a park. Since the club at that time was not a legal body, having only 102 members, they appointed trustees to whom the land was deeded. T. P. Wisecarver's tract of land was the larger donation, being nearly a quarter mile in length and 280 feet in width. The tract was deeded to the women's club in September 1906 under the condition that the club spend $1,000 the first year (equivalent to around $30,000 today) and at least $500 each subsequent year in improving the park. The club immediately commenced improvements by planting palms, shrubs, grass and trees. Planting trees was important for the Modesto community in this time period because the geographic area did not contain any natural forests, except along rivers.

The women's club was given the option to buy an adjoining 10 acres, but had only one week to raise the money for the purchase. The founder and president of the club, Mrs. E. C. Dozier, knowing that the club couldn't raise the necessary funds in such a short time, contacted the wealthy sheep rancher James Enslen for a donation. In December of 1906 Mr. Enslen agreed and donated $2,000 to the club for the purchase of the land that eventually became Enslen Park. Mrs. William Wilkinson donated 3.5 acres of adjoining land to the club to make an artificial lake (which, historically, was a feature of the park). Additional land was donated to the club shortly after by others. Beard paid for the leveling of the property out of his own pocket. He also donated the triangular traffic island formed by the juncture of L Street and 14th Street, intended to be an entrance to the park (this traffic island still exists). The early streets of Modesto were not laid in cardinal directions but were planned to be parallel and perpendicular to the railroad tracks. The first streets laid out in the more typical north/south and east/west manner were those surrounding what would become Graceada Park.

=== Early development ===
In order to raise funds for the development of the park, the women's club held their annual fiesta in June 1908 and combined the funds raised from that and their 1906 fiesta. In the early plans, Graceada and Enslen Parks were going to be one park, with Graceada identified in planning stages as the "panhandle" and Enslen the "pan." However, in the end they were separated. The plan for the park (as well as several parks in Modesto (Note: "Club Ladies Consider Plans for Parks and Playgrounds Here.")) was drafted by John T. McLaren, a prominent landscape architect and friend of John Muir, who also designed Golden Gate Park in San Francisco. McLaren was invited by the women's club to design both Graceada and Enslen parks. He completed drafting the plans by February 1907, and was aided in the planning effort by a certain Louis A. Rose, who is also credited with being the first person to plant a Modesto Ash in the city. Original features of the park included strolling paths, tennis courts, an artificial lake, a 144-foot rose arbor adjacent to the tennis courts, and many trees of different varieties. In designing the park, McLaren embraced naturalism and designed an arboretum and a promenade. McLaren tried to replicate the trees groves that naturally existed on the plot of land. E. K. Ekstein donated 1,000 eucalyptus trees in 10 different species to the park. The original trees of the park are easily identifiable because they are mostly clustered together and are quite large. Approximately twenty percent of these original trees remain in the park today (as of the year 2024). The four stone and brick pillars that stand today at the entrance to Enslen park cost the club $555 in 1909, or roughly $17,000 today.

Graceada Park was officially dedicated with a ceremony on April 4, 1907 at the unpaved intersection of Alice and Park Avenue. The park existed under the ownership of the Women's Improvement Club until 1913 when the club could no longer afford the upkeep costs ($4,000 per year) and turned the land over to the city as a donation. (Note: A dedication marker on the south end of Graceada Park says, "Graceada Park was a gift of the Women's Improvement Club to the City of Modesto 1913." A playground wall at Sanders Neighborhood Park puts the opening of Graceada Park to 1907, prior to its donation by the WIC to the city.) By the time the park was donated to the city, the club had spent $32,000 in total of their won money for its beautification and upkeep. By 1912, the club had finished their work of planting trees at the park. Since then, the diverse multitude of trees has been characteristic of Graceada Park, and it has been described as a "mini-arboretum."

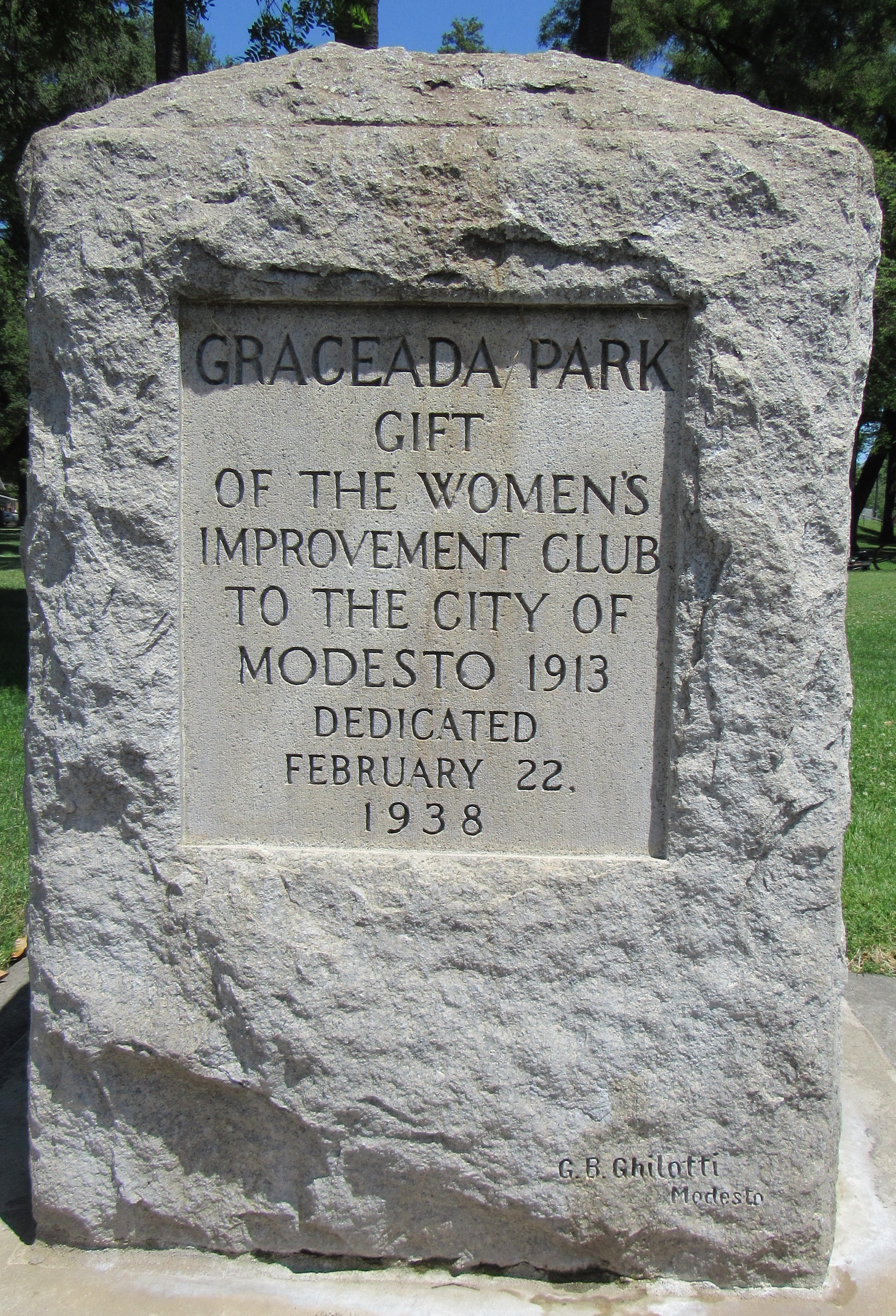
Dedication marker on the south end of Graceada Park

=== Naming ===
The name of the park was initially proposed to be Beard-Wisecarver Park, in honor of the donors. However, Beard declined this honor. Subsequently, the name Graceada was chosen, a portmanteau of the first names of Beard's and Wisecarver's wives, Grace Beard and Ada Wisecarver. Thus, Graceada is pronounced "GRACE-AIDA" and not "GRUH-SAIDA." Coincidentally, Grace Beard's middle name was also Ada. There is a misconception that the park was named after Grace M. Davis and her sister (whom Grace M. Davis High School in Modesto was named after), however this is not the case. (Note: "Wrong Grace, Ada.")

=== Notable events held at the park ===
Over the years, Graceada Park has been used as the location for numerous civic events and gatherings. After the end of World War I, on October 16, 1919, 15,000 people gathered at Graceada Park to welcome home some 1,000 war veterans from the army and navy. The veterans assembled on 12th Street and were escorted to the park where they, "marched along, column after column with a firm, steady step, cheered by the crowd again and again." At the park, speeches were given, songs were sung by a sixty-person chorus, and a banquet was served in the tennis area on long tables laden with delicacies for which Stanislaus County is famous. Honored among the veterans during the evening were the eighty-five Stanislaus County soldiers who lost their lives in World War I.

On Arbor Day on March 7, 1928 (a holiday instituted by the Women's Improvement Club), Modesto citizens gathered at Graceada Park to celebrate both the efforts to plant trees of the Women's Improvement Club and the firemen of the city, as well as to ceremonially place the city fire bell in the park. The fire bell, also used to announce curfew for youth, had been put to service in 1884 and was originally mounted on a tower at the Modesto Water Works building at 819 10th Street. (Note: "Modesto Fittingly Observes Arbor Day.") The bell remained at Graceada Park for sixty-three years until it was moved to the front of Fire Station No. 2 in 1991 and dedicated on October 18 of that year.

In October 1954, a week-long celebration was held to commemorate the 100-year anniversary of Stanislaus County. As the first event of the festivities, on May 12, 3,000 people attended the dedication of the Mancini Music Bowl (a stage for symphonic concerts). The Bowl, named in honor of Francesco Nicolo "Frank" Mancini who was a music teacher at a Modesto high school, could seat up to 1,000 people.

On July 23, 1980, U.S. Representative John B. Anderson made an appearance at Graceada Park when he ran for president as an independent, hosting a picnic lunch event. (Note: "Others Who Campaigned Here.")

=== The Graceada Mansion ===
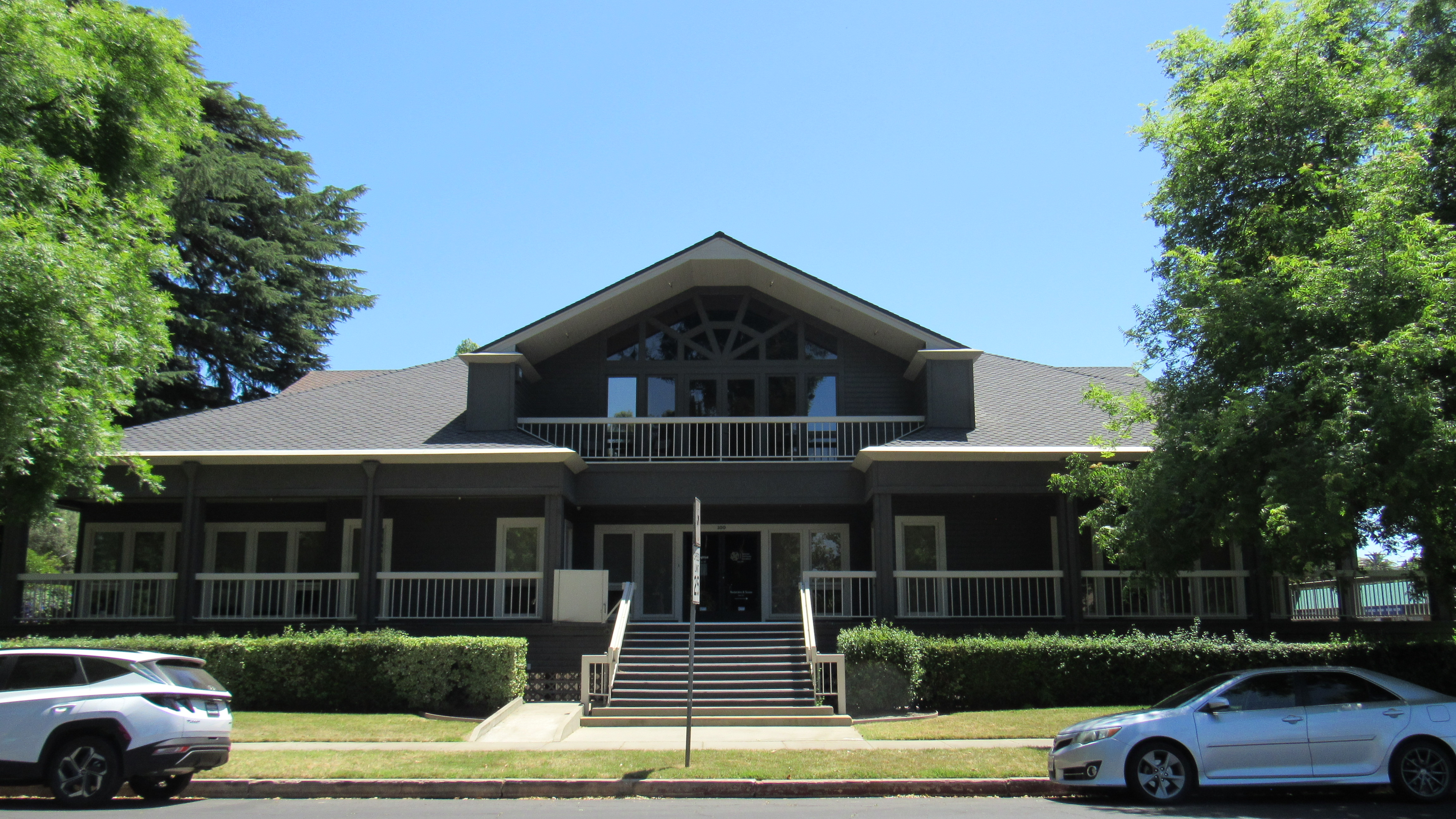
The office building that currently exists over the site where the Graceada Mansion was

In 1914, T.K. Beard and his wife Grace Beard moved to a house adjacent to Graceada Park on the corner of Sycamore Avenue and Needham Street which was called the Graceada Mansion, at 102 Sycamore Avenue. The original mansion, which was demolished in the 1940s, was designed by American architect Frank Delos Wolfe in his signature "California Prairie" style. The mansion was demolished because of a dispute between the owner (an owner subsequent to Mr. T. K. Beard) and the city. Today, an office building built in the 1980s exists where the Graceada Mansion used to be.

=== 1999 renovations ===
In July 1999, a $350,000 renovation of Graceada Park was completed. The endeavor was jointly financed by the city, which donated $150,000, and by a support group called Graceada Is Fun Times (GIFT), which raised about $200,000 through donations. The project saw the construction of a new play area and structure (replacing the 1948 structure), a walk-through fountain, and a small amphitheater for children's productions, graduations, and recitals, an expanded swimming pool area, and new landscaping. The renovation took three years of planning and fundraising and a ribbon-cutting ceremony was held to open the park after its completion.

== Park features ==
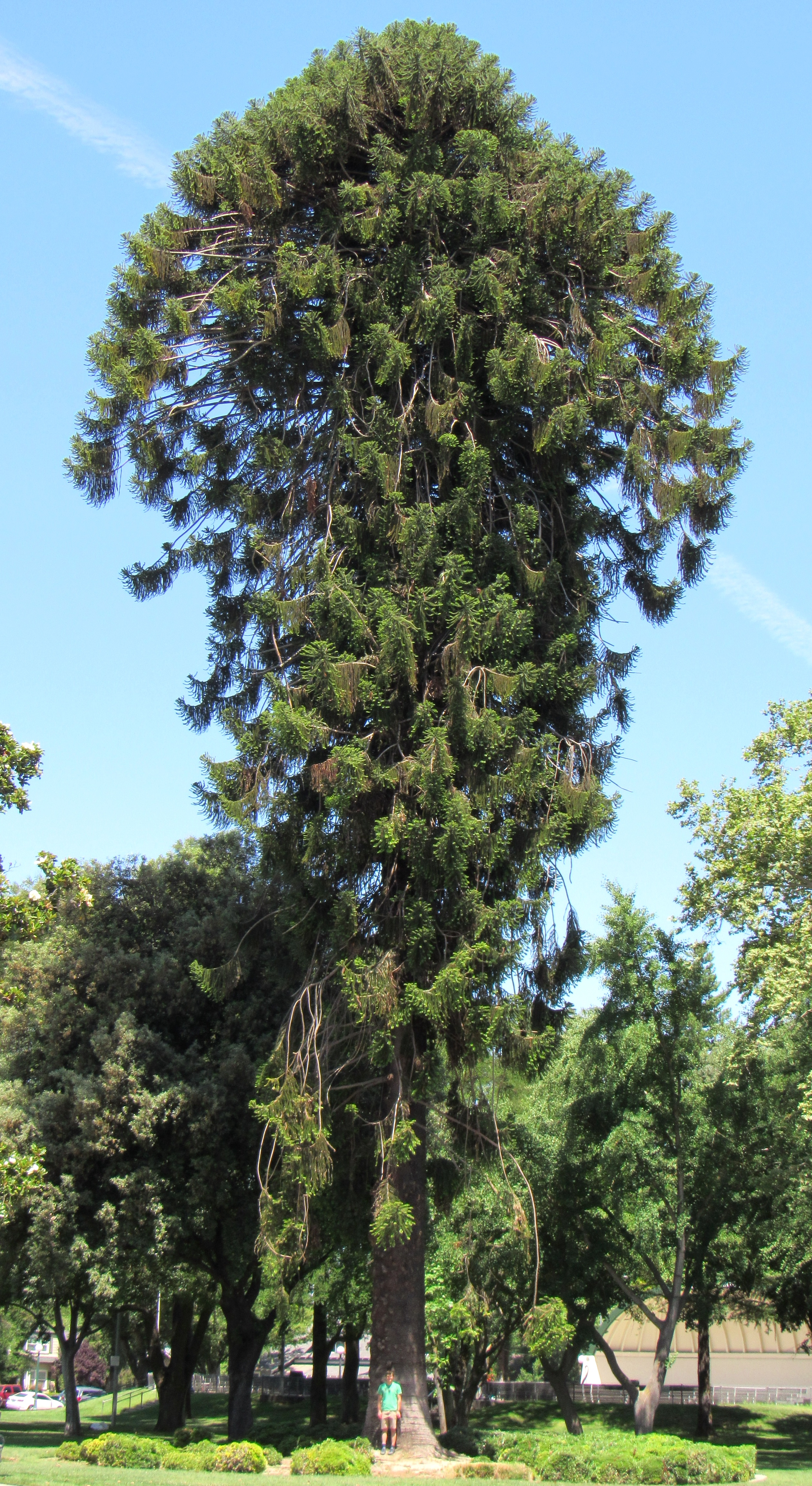
The 116-foot tall Bunya Bunya tree at the south end of the park

- The Soderstrom Rotary Pavilion was provided by donation from the Modesto Rotary International club and cost $100,000 to construct. It was named in honor of longtime club member Ernest Fred Soderstrom.
- Modesto's only public wading pool.
- The tennis courts at Graceada Park have been a part of the park since before the 1920s. Tennis was exceptionally popular in the 1920s in the Central Valley and professional teams competed on the tennis courts at Graceada Park. (Note: "Two Tennis Courts on West Side to be Paved; Work Starts Immediately.") The courts were initially arranged in an east-west orientation, yet because of the setting or rising sun impairing the vision of the players, they were reoriented to a north-south alignment. Today, there are two tennis courts and twelve pickleball courts at the park.
- A large play structure with a splash fountain for children.
- A smaller play area for younger children.
- The Mancini Music Bowl, an amphitheater named after Frank Mancini, is located in the center of the park. MoBand concerts are held here in the summer as well as other events. The bowl once could seat about 1,270 people. However, because of vandalism and wear, about 270 of the seats were removed over the years. The Bowl originally had wood and concrete benches (they are entirely metal today).
- A small amphitheater for children's productions near the play structure.
- The 116 foot-tall Bunya Bunya tree (Araucaria bidwillii, a species native to New Zealand) located at the southern end of the park on the corner of Needham and Sycamore Avenues, was gifted and dedicated on April 17, 1916 by the Grand Parlor of the Native Sons of the Golden West to commemorate their state convention. A sandstone tablet at the foot of the tree says, "Dedicated to the Grand Parlor, N. S. G. W., April 19, 1917." The Bunya Bunya tree was officially designated as a Historic Landmark by the city on 10 November 1998 and is considered to be both the tallest and oldest tree in Modesto. That same year, the Historic Landmark report noted that the Bunya Bunya was at least eighty-two years old, making it at least 108 years old in 2024. Bunya Bunyas produce acorns that can be 10-20 lbs. in weight, making impact from a falling acorn lethal. For that reason, in April 1989 the city planted shrubbery underneath the tree to discourage park users from sitting under it and putting themselves unknowingly in danger. Furthermore, the city has in the past sent workers out to remove the acorns periodically before they become large, to prevent the problem from arising. Notably, in 1964, a thirteen-pound acorn was removed from the tree. (Note: "Yesteryears.")
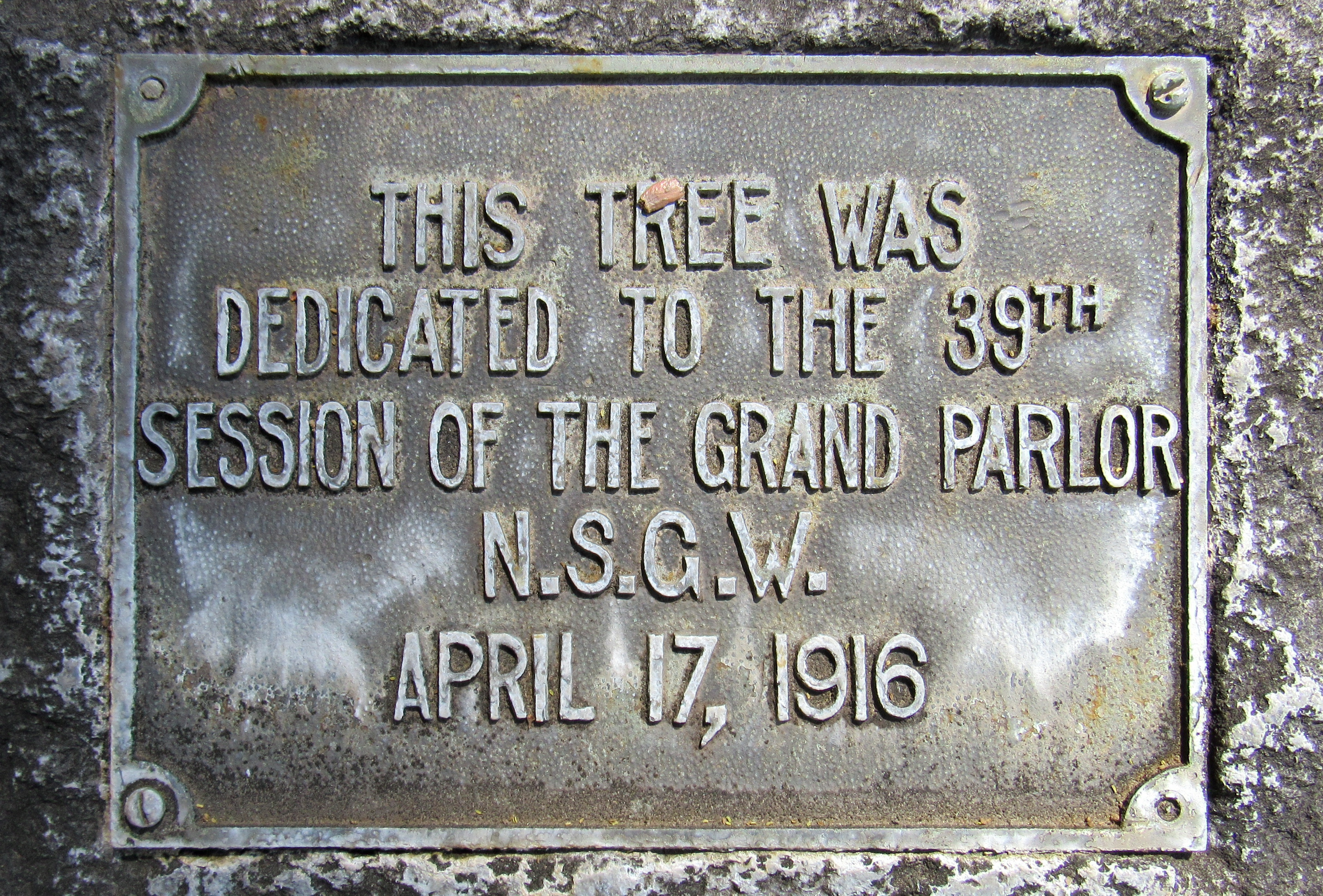
  The plaque in front of the Bunya Bunya tree at the park

== Modern usage ==
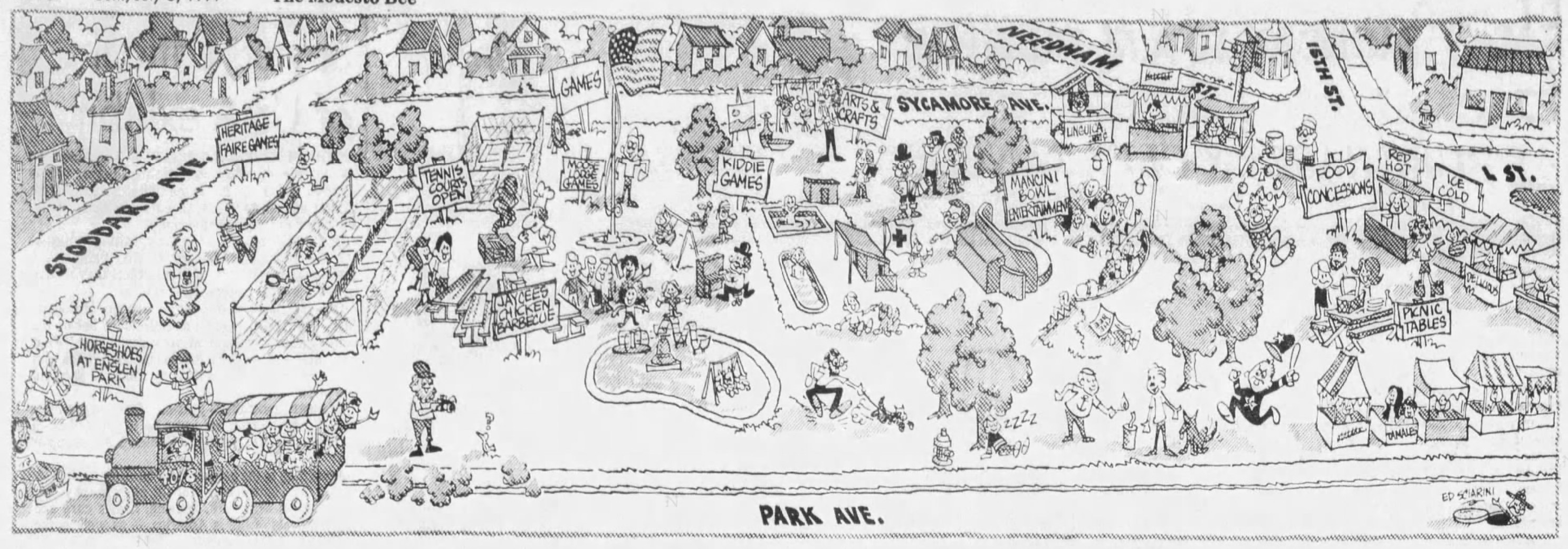
A cartoon in the Modesto Bee on 3 July 1977 showing the 4th of July festivities that happened in the park. The cartoonist was Ed Sciarini

During the Great Recession, Graceada Park fell into disrepair. Since that time, the park has been slowly improving and remains one of the most iconic public spaces in the city of Modesto. "It's by far the most used park in our system," said Steve Lumpkin in 2011, Superintendent of Building Services and Forestry for the city, "Graceada is where almost all the special events are." In 1998, the Parks Planning and Development Manager Fred Allen told the Modesto Bee, "You might as well call [Graceada Park] Modesto's central park. It's one of the oldest and it's the center of our older community. It's our ceremonial park, where we have our big events."

=== Homelessness ===
In recent years, homelessness has been an issue in Graceada Park as it is in Modesto as a whole; a 2016 count found 1,051 homeless individuals in the city. People living in the neighborhood surrounding Graceada Park have complained about the conduct of vagrants. In 2017, surveillance cameras were installed in Graceada Park in an effort to deter crime and homeless encampment. The effort was a partnership between Rank Investigations and Protection, the College Area Neighborhood Alliance (CANA), and the city.

=== Concert in the Park ===
Today, the Modesto Band of Stanislaus County's (MoBand) "Concert in the Park" happens at Graceada Park in the Mancini Music Bowl every Thursday evening for six weeks during summer, usually in mid-June. (Note: "Summer Traditions.") Each concert typically draws an audience of 2,500 to 3,000 people. The band's longtime conductor George Gardner who has conducted MoBand for forty-five years announced his retirement in 2024. MoBand is volunteer-based, and a total of 200–225 musicians play in their concerts each year.

MoBand is one of the oldest continuously performing bands in the U.S. and was formed in 1919. In the 1920s, this band was under the directorship of Frank Mancini, for whom the Mancini Bowl was named. Famous composer and band director John Philip Sousa, during a visit to Modesto in 1926, said, "Probably no one in the world hears more High School bands than I do, and of all the bands I've heard, I consider none superior to the one you have here." MoBand has played at Graceada Park for more than a century, originally performing on Friday nights until in the 1970s that tradition was changed to Thursday nights. The band used to bring chairs out to the park and string lights up until an organization started by Frank Mancini's wife raised money for the construction of the Mancini Music Bowl.

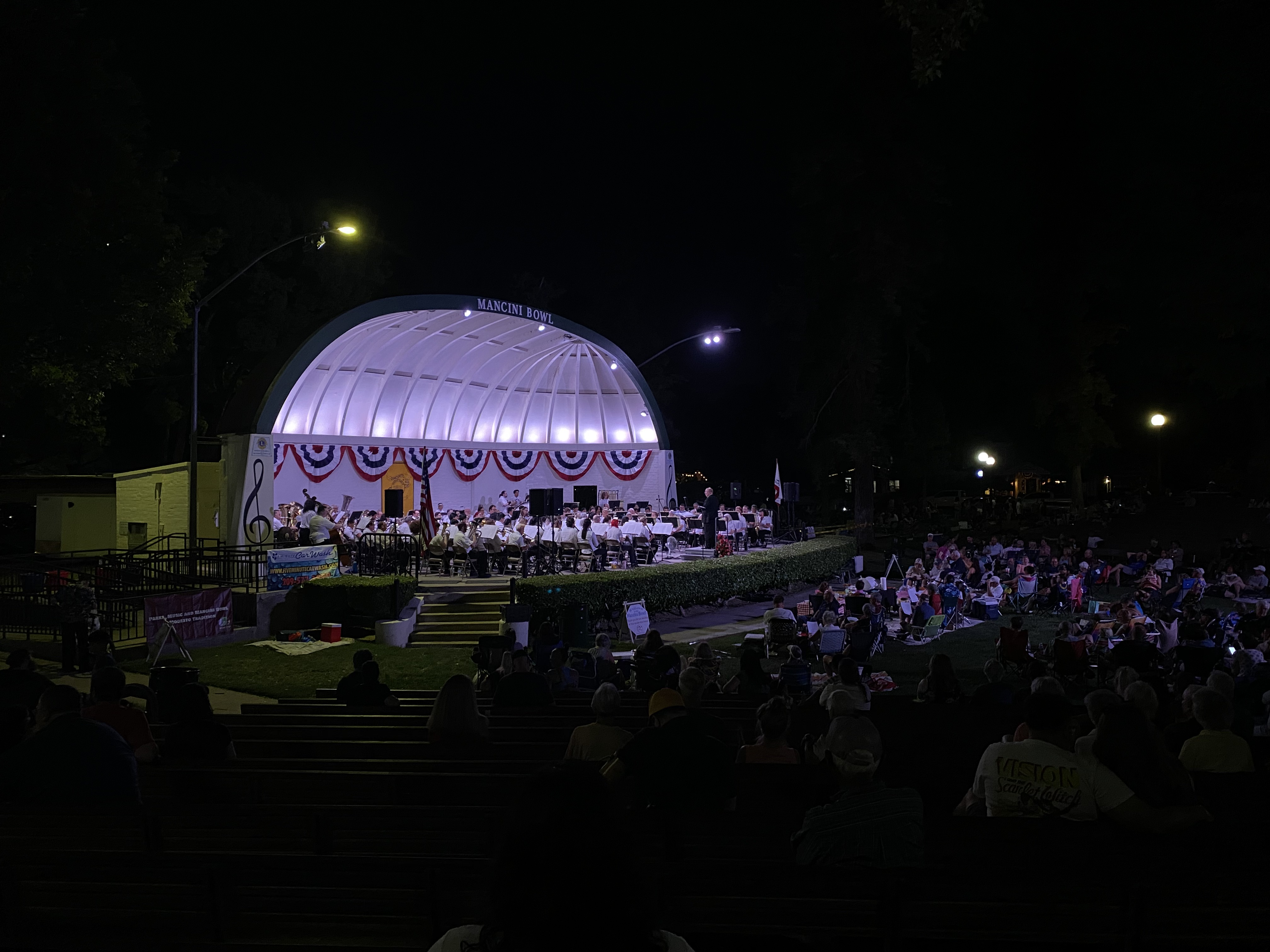
Conductor George Gardner leading MoBand at Concert in the Park on June 6, 2024, likely his last year as conductor

=== Gala in the Graceada ===
CANA has held fundraising events at Graceada Park called "Gala in the Graceada." The proceeds from these events are used for park improvement. (Note: "About Gala in the Graceada.") In 2019, the gala included a three-course meal, live music, and a silent auction.

=== Graceada Partners ===
Named after the park, Graceada Partners is real estate investment company located in the Central Valley with $640M assets under management which focuses on investing in inefficient secondary and tertiary markets in the Western United States. (Note: "Graceada Partners Home Page.")

== Gallery ==
Images of Graceada Park
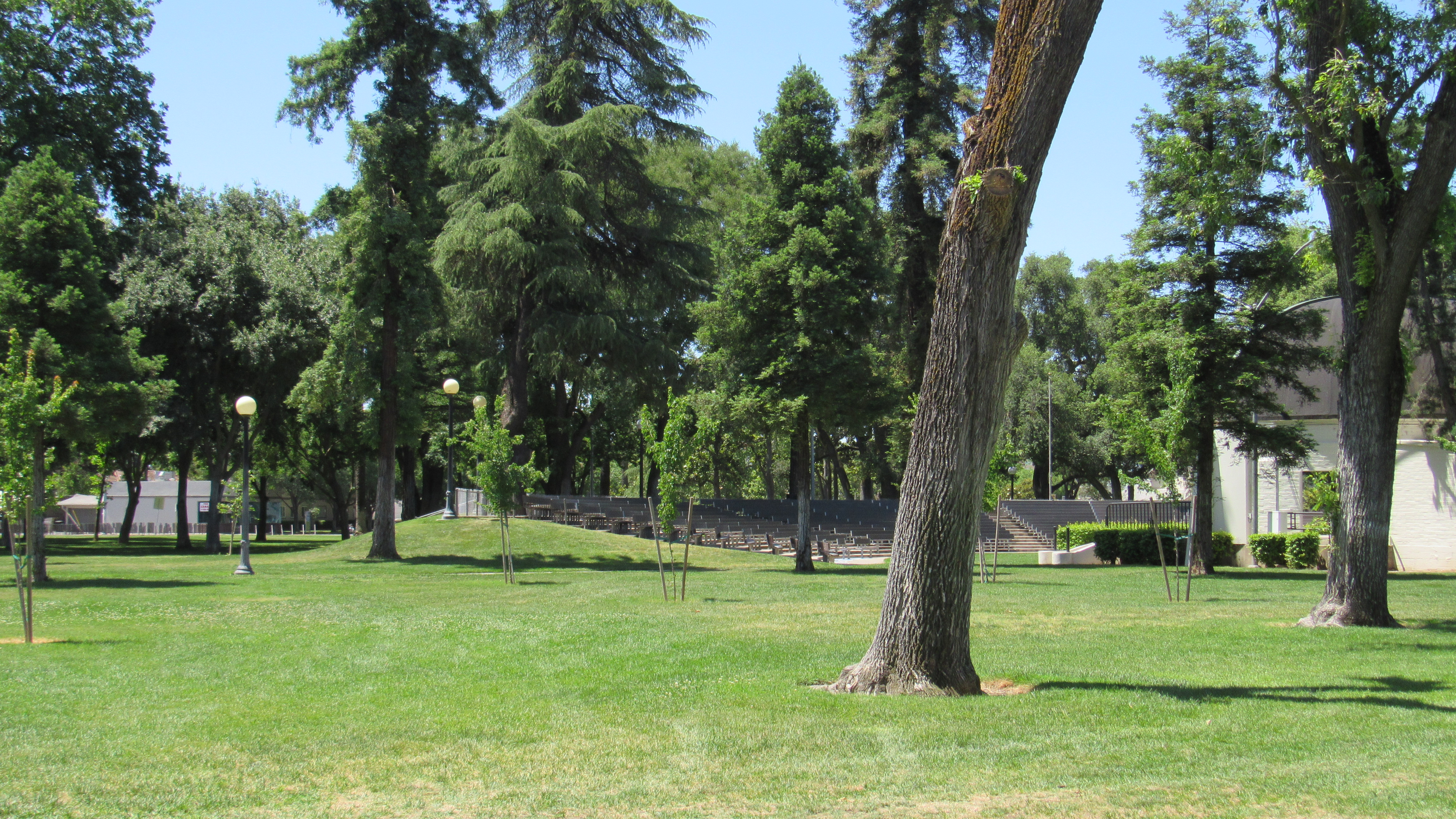
View west towards the Mancini Bowl

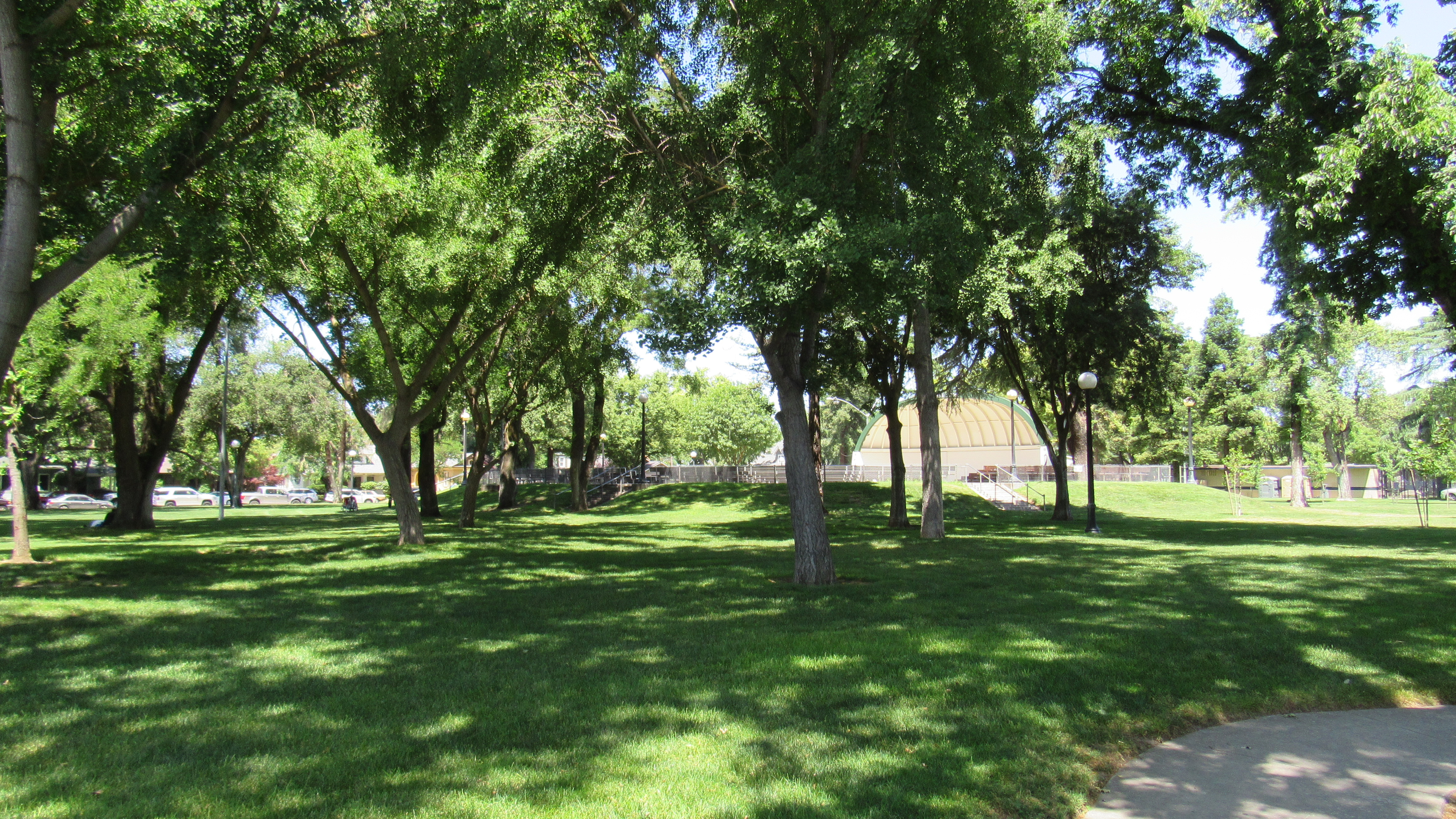
View north towards the Mancini Bowl

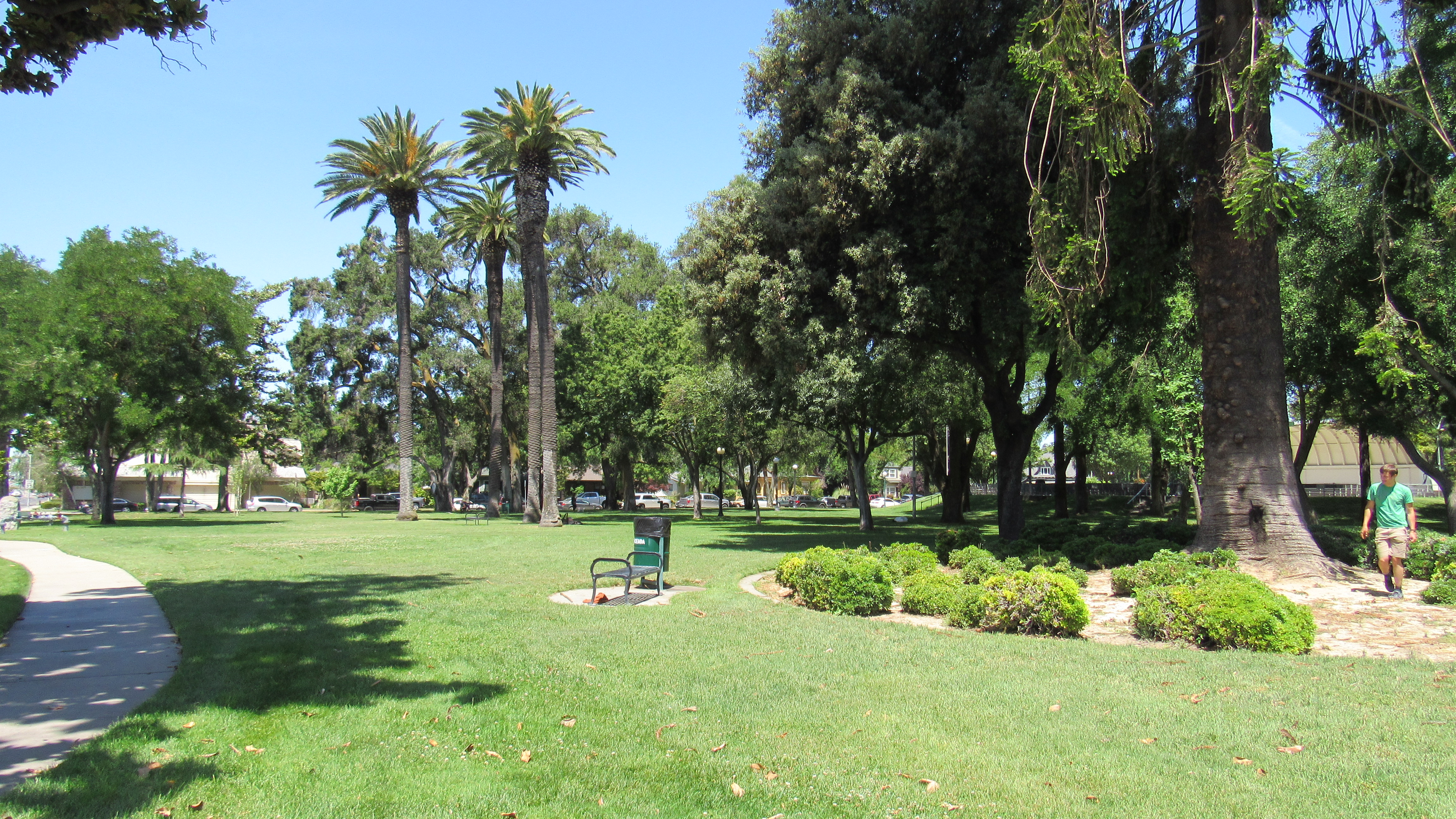
View north-west from corner of Needham and Sycamore Avenues

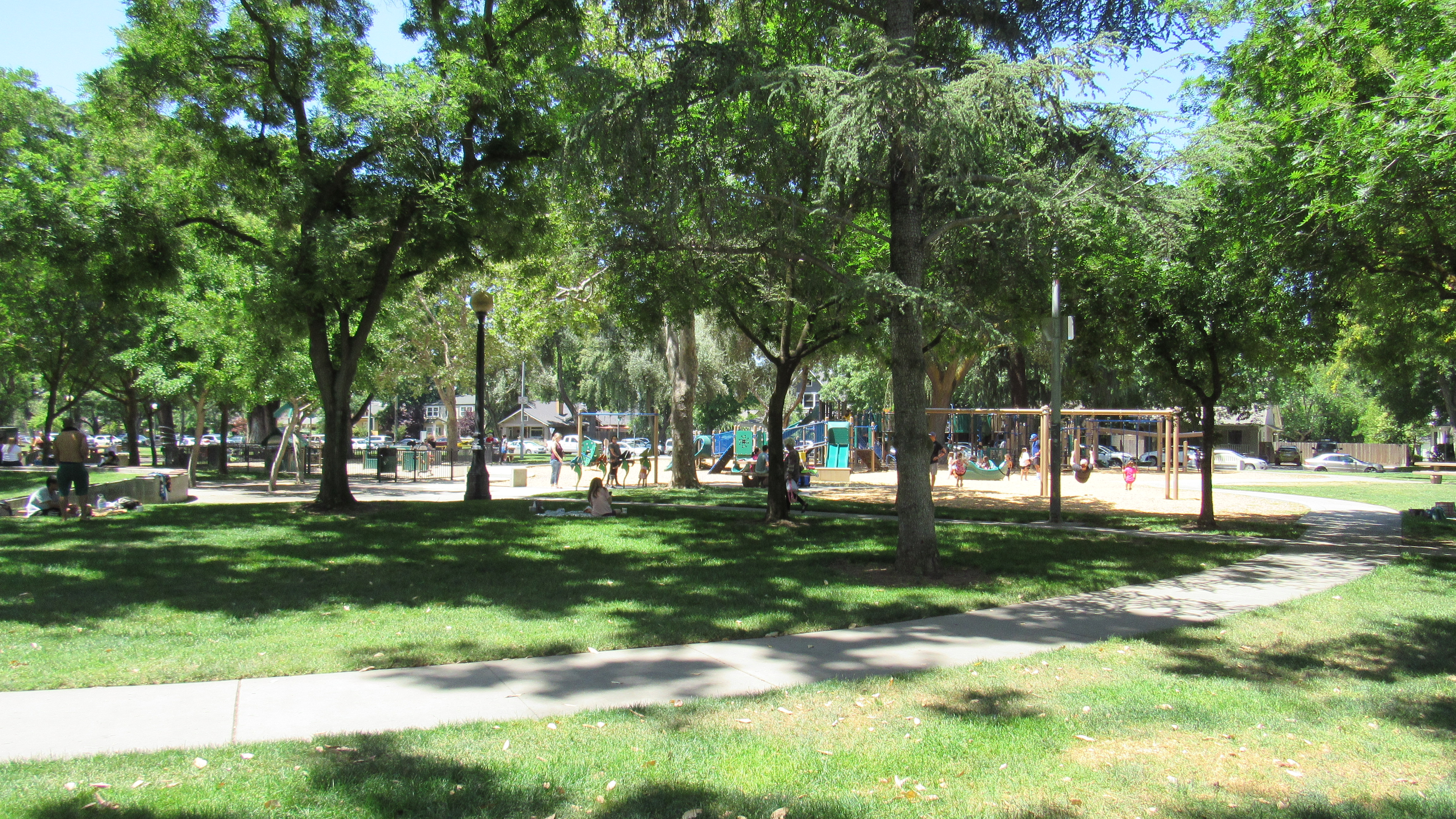
View west towards the play structure

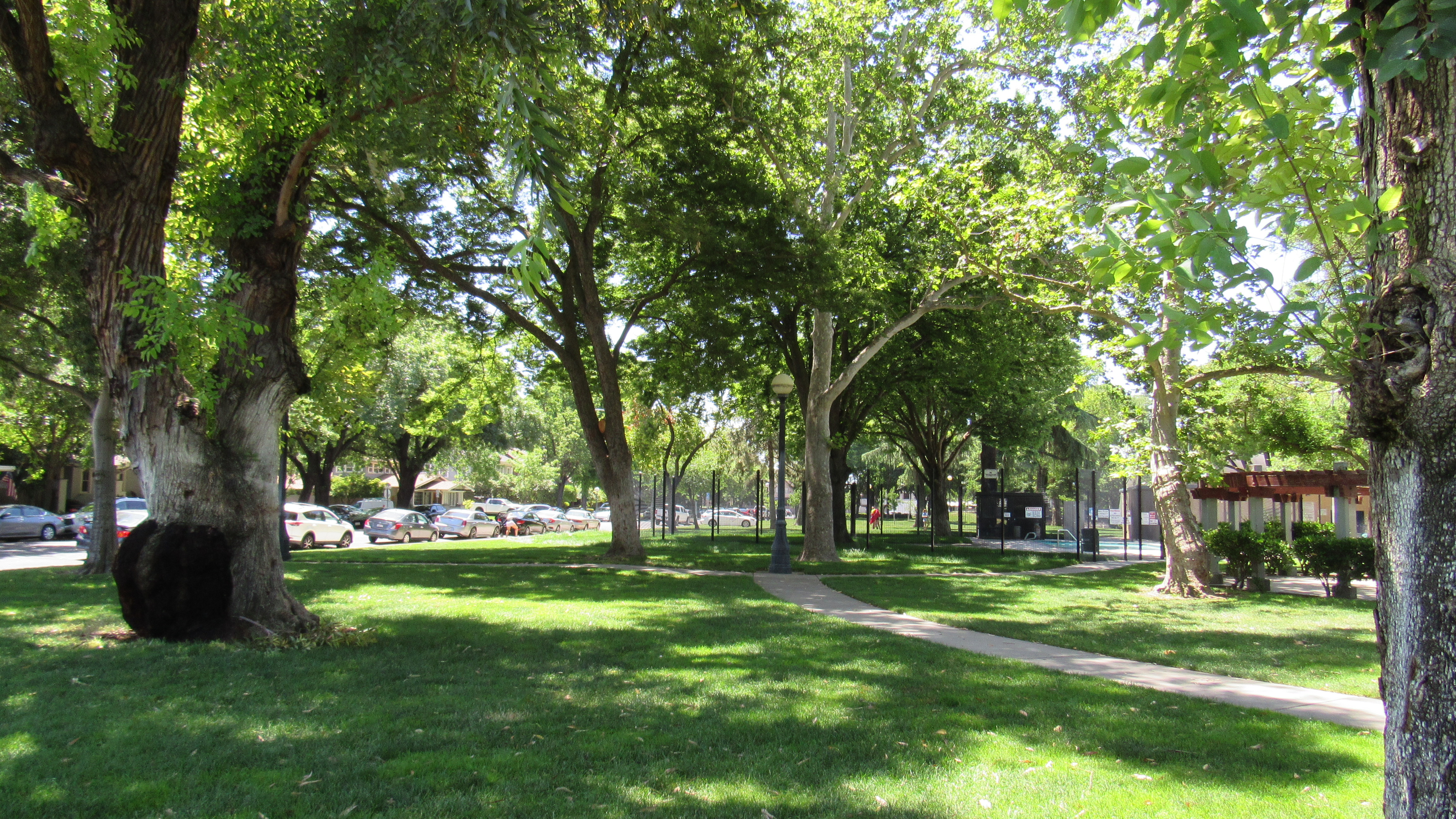
View south towards the swimming pool

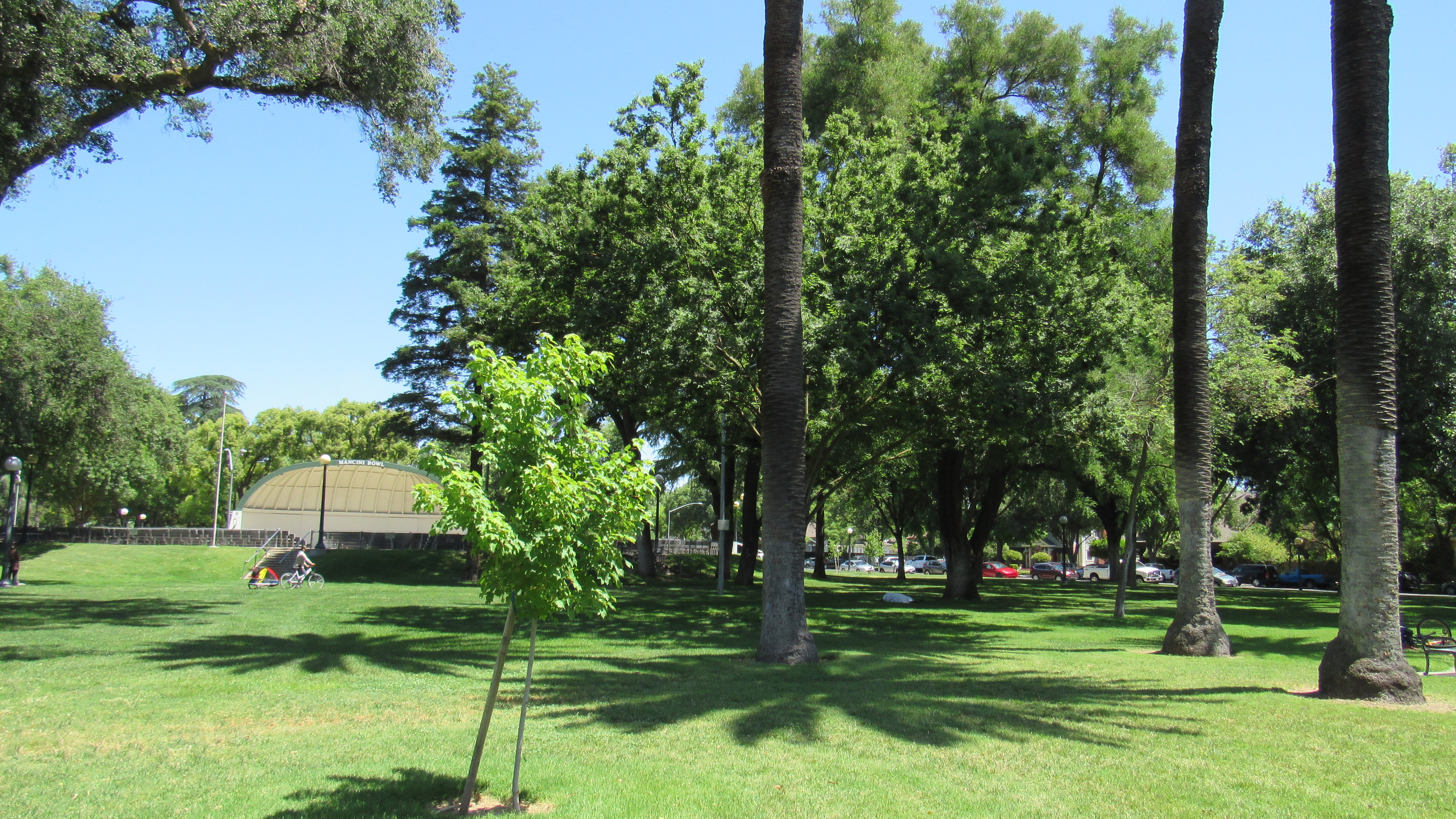
View north towards the Mancini Bowl

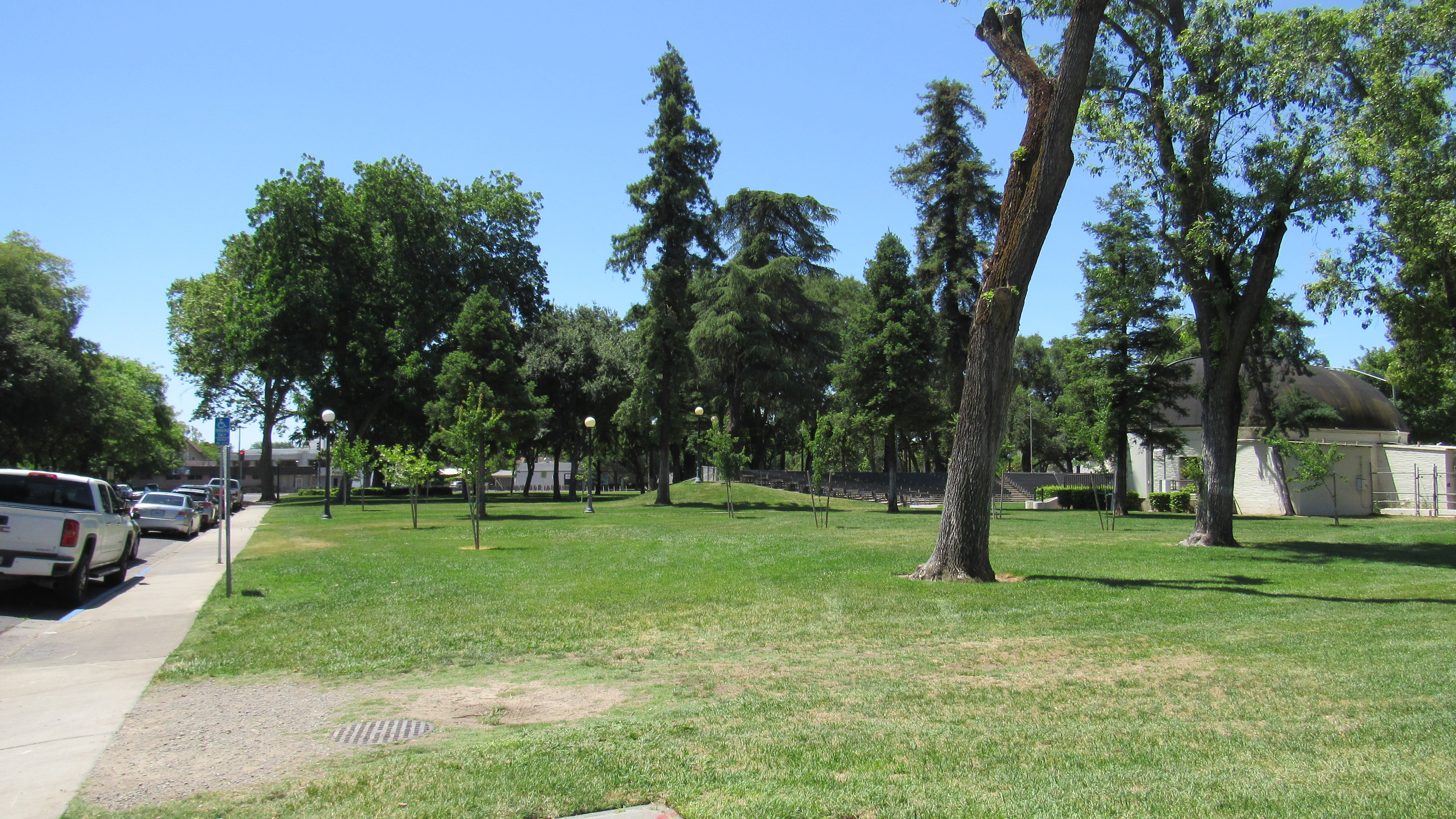
View north-east from the corner of Needham and Park Avenues

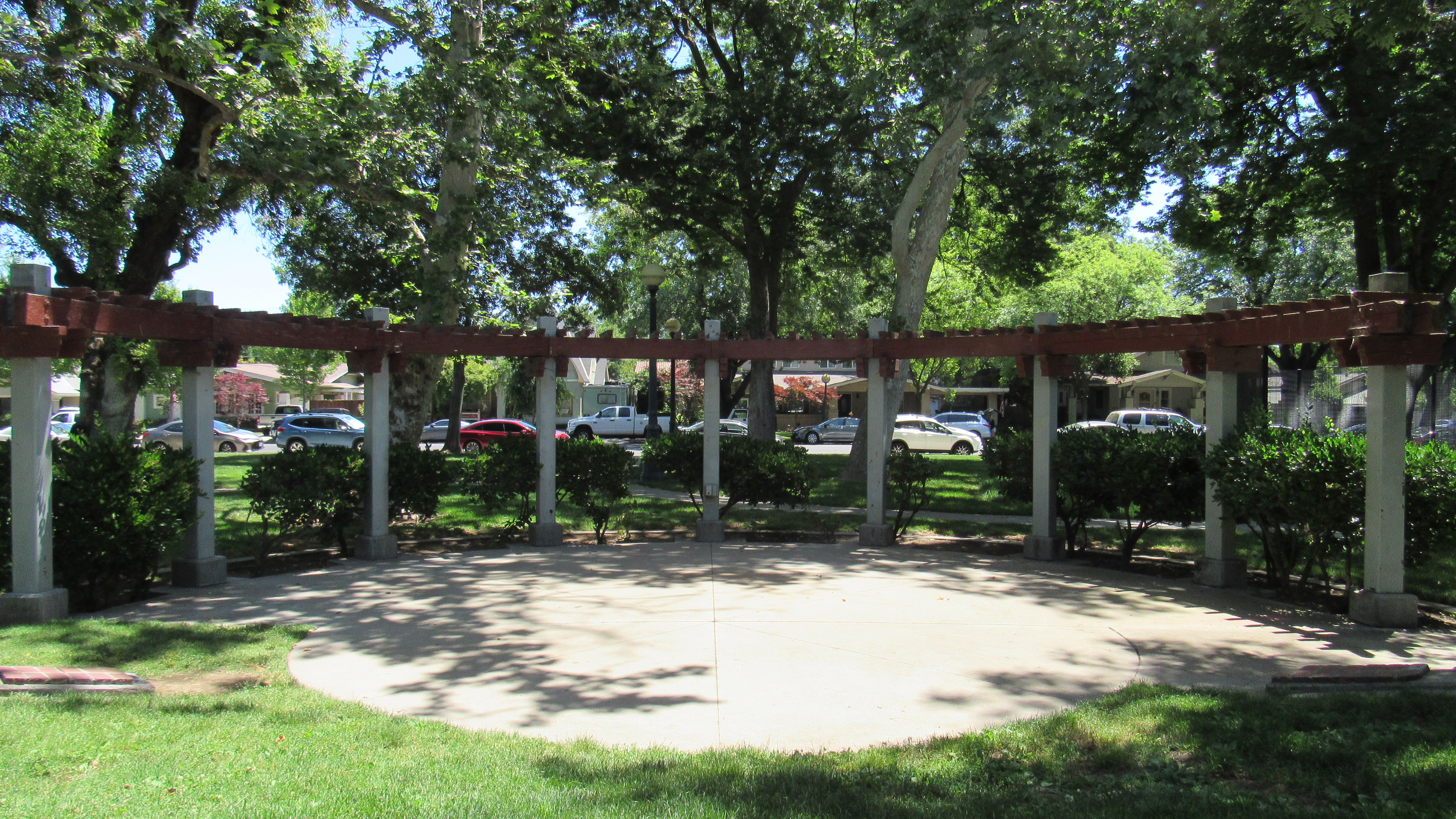
View of the children's amphitheater that was constructed in 1999

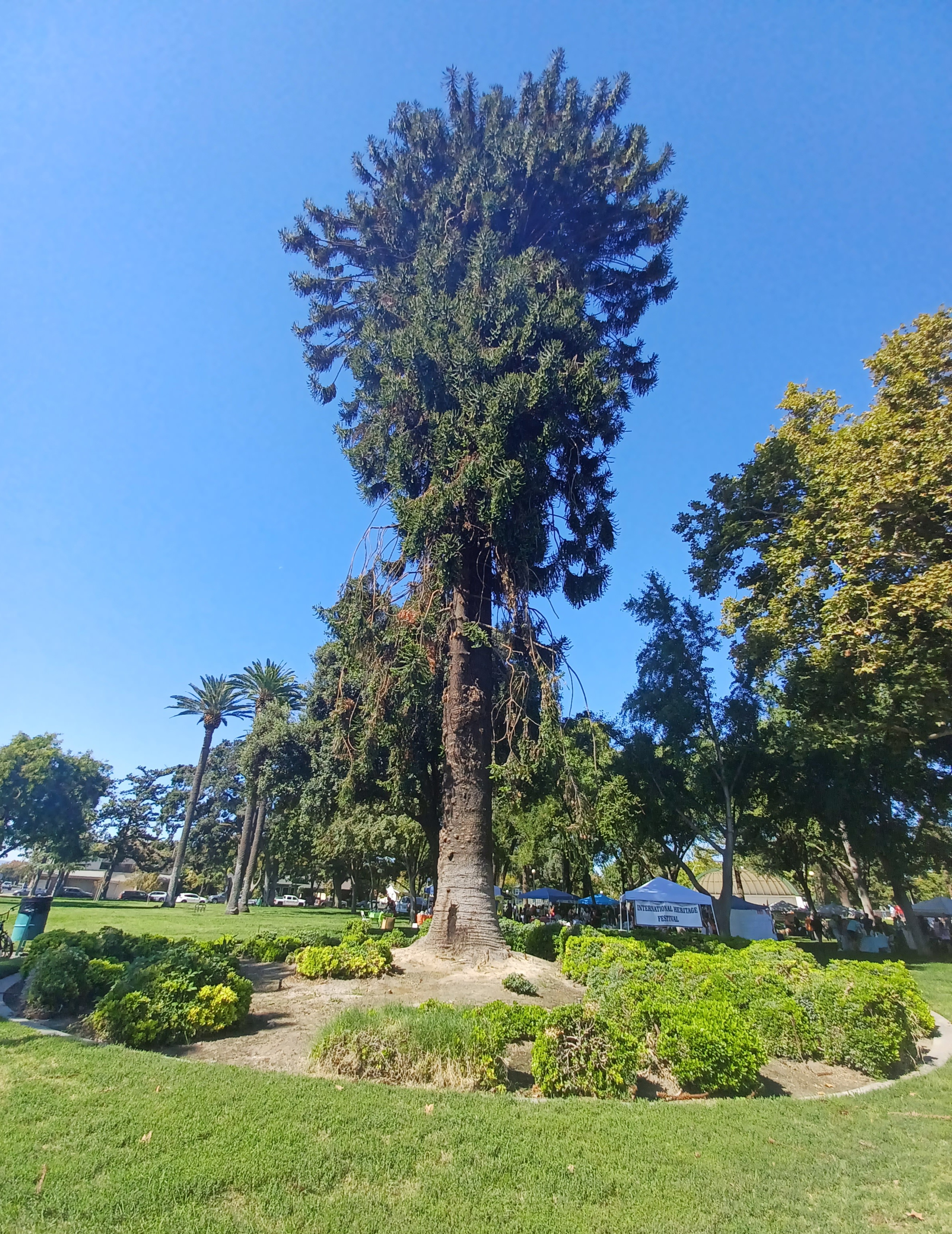
Another view of the Bunya Bunya tree

== See also ==
- Modesto ash tree
- Modesto and Empire Traction Company (a company owned by the Beard family)

== Works cited ==
- Tinkham, George Henry (1921). History of Stanislaus County, California: With Biographical Sketches of the Leading Men and Women of the County, who Have Been Identified with Its Growth and Development from the Early Days to the Present. Vol. 1. Los Angeles, California: Historic Record Company. pp. 155, 167.
- Bare, Colleen Stanley (1999). Modesto Then and Now. Modesto, California: McHenry Museum Press. pp. 48, 50, 73–74, 86–87, 112–113, 132–133. ISBN 0930349059.
- Lindenberger, Ruth (1939). Beard Family History and Genealogy. ISBN 9780832874536.
- Belt, Lois (2015). Rivara, Don; Gordon, Karen; Barr, Nancy (eds.). "The Beard Family of Stanislaus County" (PDF). Stanislaus Stepping Stones. Vol. 39, no. 1–2. Modesto, California: McHenry Museum & Historical Society. pp. 2146–2147.
- Farrow, Deke (October 8, 2020). "A Park System 150 Years in the Making, Modesto's Has Something for Everyone". The Modesto Bee.
- Baggese, Carl (2017). "Graceada Park". Historic Modesto.
- Guerra, Patty (October 28, 2011). "Modesto's Graceada Park Ranks Among Top 100 Public Spaces". The Modesto Bee.
- Clark, Pat (February 7, 2024). "Huge Change Coming for Modesto's Beloved MoBand". The Modesto Bee.
- Clark, Pat (June 5, 2023). "MoBand Ready to Return with New Features for Summer Concerts. What, When and Where". The Modesto Bee.
- "T. K. Beard Donates Addition to Graceada Park". Stanislaus County Weekly News. Vol. 37, no. 17. May 15, 1907. p. 4.
- "City Landmarks". Official website of the City of Modesto.
- "Summer Traditions". Official website of the City of Modesto.
- "Concert in the Park: History". Official website of the Modesto Band of the Stanislaus County.
- Bassett, W. K. (February 23, 1912). "Woman Organized Wield Wonderful Power for Good". Stanislaus County Weekly News. p. 3.
- "Trees—Why Not Talk About Modesto's Trees?". Stanislaus County Weekly News. December 20, 1912. p. 4.
- "Club Ladies Consider Plans for Parks and Playgrounds Here". Stanislaus County Weekly News. October 9, 1910. p. 2.
- "Drunken Vandals Drive Automobile Over Park Shrubs". Stanislaus County Weekly News. September 27, 1912. p. 1.
- "James Enslen Called to Rest". Stanislaus County Weekly News. November 18, 1910. p. 2.
- "About Gala in the Graceada". Gala in the Graceada.
- Scherer, Julie (April 15, 2019). "Help Parks Sparkle with May 11 Gala in Graceada". The Modesto Bee. pp. A6.
- Miller, Jim (July 23, 1999). "Kids, Come and Unwrap Graceada!". The Modesto Bee. p. 7.
- Peters, John Scott (July 10, 1974). "Modesto, City of Trees—A Legacy Continues to Grow". The Modesto Bee. pp. C-8.
- Howard, Julie (July 30, 1998). "Graceada Park was a Gift to the Community". The Modesto Bee.
- "Modesto Fittingly Observes Arbor Day". The Modesto News-Herald. Vol. 29, no. 67. March 8, 1928. p. 1.
- "Two Tennis Courts on West Side to be Paved; Work Starts Immediately". The Modesto News-Herald. Vol. 27, no. 192. August 13, 1926. p. 9.
- "Others Who Campaigned Here". The Modesto Bee. July 24, 1988. pp. A-2.
- "$5000 Needed by W.I.C. to Clear Clubhouse Debt". The Modesto News-Herald. October 2, 1928. p. 7.
- Stanley Bare, Colleen (October 2, 2011). "Dedicated Women Established City's First Parks". The Modesto Bee. pp. B4.
- "Beard Big Aid to Women's Club". The Modesto Bee. August 1, 1925. p. 16.
- "Wrong Grace, Ada". The Modesto Bee. July 17, 1969. pp. A-7.
- Nelson, Diane (March 15, 1989). "Towering Park Tree to Go 'Off Limits'". The Modesto Bee. p. 14.
- Haller, John M. (December 13, 1991). "Park Bunya-Bunya One of Modesto's Oldest, Tallest Trees". The Modesto Bee.
- "Yesteryears". The Modesto Bee. September 26, 1984. p. 15.
- Noda, Debbie (June 23, 1981). "Welcome New Shade". The Modesto Bee. p. 37.
- Van Laan, Krista (2014). Frank Delos Wolfe: California Prairie Architecture. Archives & Architecture. pp. 1–222. ISBN 9780692213537.
- Valine, Kevin (January 28, 2017). "Electronic Eyes to Watch for Trouble at Graceada". The Modesto Bee. pp. A1.
- Carlson, Ken (January 14, 2011). "Modesto to Form Panel to Address Homeless Issues". The Modesto Bee. pp. B1–B2.
- "Graceada Partners Home Page". Graceada Partners.
- Boer, Dena; Maino-Emeritus, Jeanette; Gray, Thorne, eds. (1987). "Ellen Bewley Bystrom - Pioneer Stock" (PDF). Stanislaus Stepping Stones. 11 (1). Stanislaus County Historical Society: 567.
