= McLaren Lodge =

Building in San Francisco, California

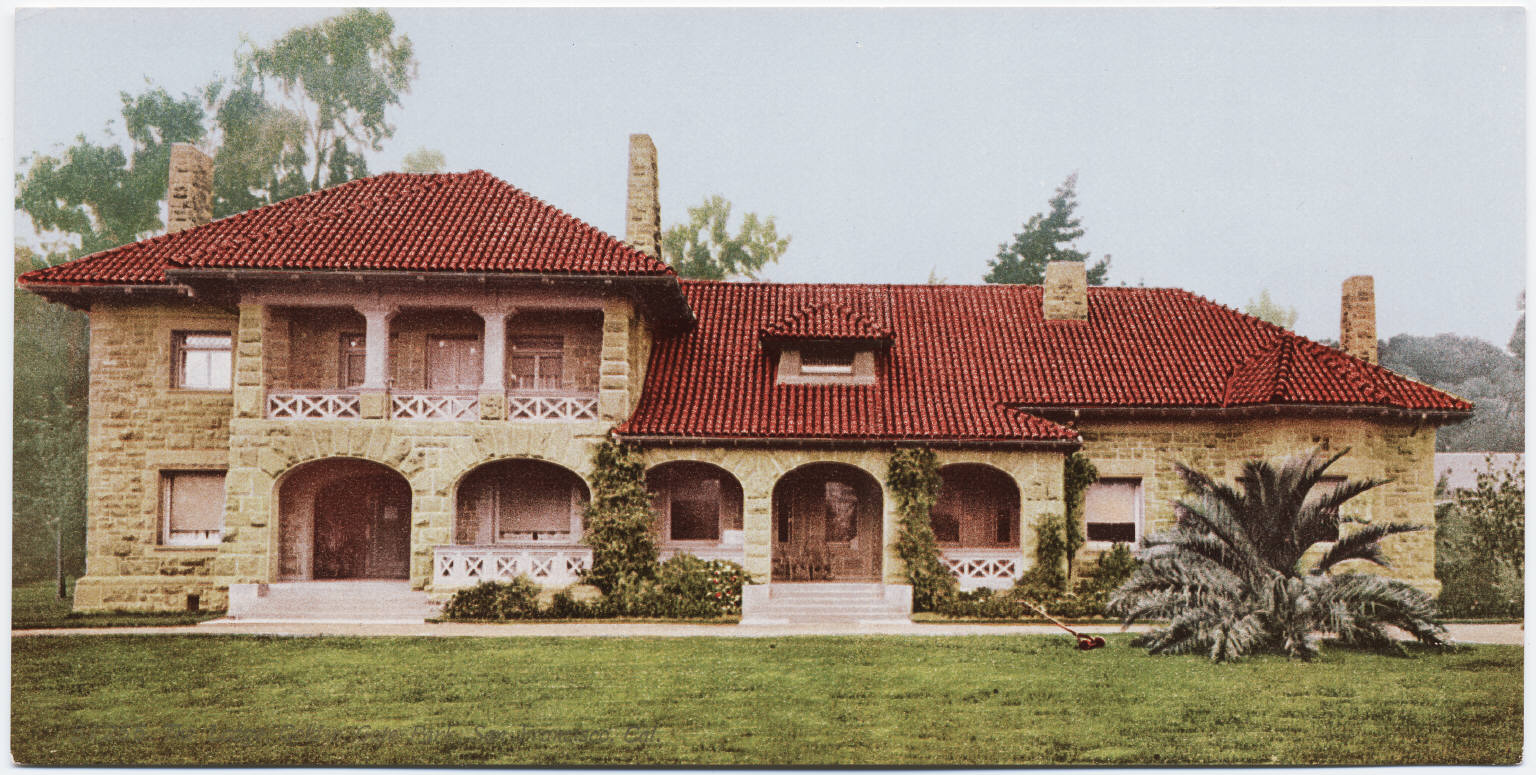

- Location within San Francisco County Location within California
- 37.7717°N 122.4547°W
- Location: Golden Gate Park, 501 Stanyan Street, San Francisco, California, U.S.

History
- Built: 1896
- Built for: John McLaren

Site notes
- Architect: Edward R. Swain
- Owner: San Francisco Parks Department (1896–1949), San Francisco Recreation & Parks Department (1950–present)

San Francisco Designated Landmark
- Designated: November 4, 1984
- Reference no.: 175

McLaren Lodge is an historic building within Golden Gate Park in San Francisco, California, U.S.. Built in 1896, the building served dual use; as the home of the superintendent of the park department John McLaren, until his death in 1943; and also serves as the headquarters for the San Francisco Parks Department (now known as San Francisco Recreation & Parks Department). It is listed as a San Francisco designated landmark since 1984.

== History ==
The McLaren Lodge was built in 1896, and designed by architect Edward Robinson Swain. The rustic stone exterior is reminiscent of the earlier Richardsonian Romanesque-era. It is often described as having a Moorish–Gothic architectural style. It is located at the east end of Golden Gate Park.

The building served as the home of the San Francisco park department's fifth superintendent John McLaren, until his death in 1943. The building also serves as the headquarters for the San Francisco Parks Department (now known as San Francisco Recreation & Parks Department) since it was built. It was officially named McLaren Lodge by the city parks commission in February 1943, weeks after McLaren's death.

The housing portion of the building contains six bedrooms. From 1943 until May 1950, Julian L. Girod became the sixth superintendent of the park department and moved into the housing portion of the building. After the Girod family left, the building sections were combined to create the newly formed, San Francisco Recreation & Parks Department.

== See also ==
- List of San Francisco Designated Landmarks
