= The Doughboy (San Francisco) =

Statue by Melvin Earl Cummings in San Francisco, California, U.S.

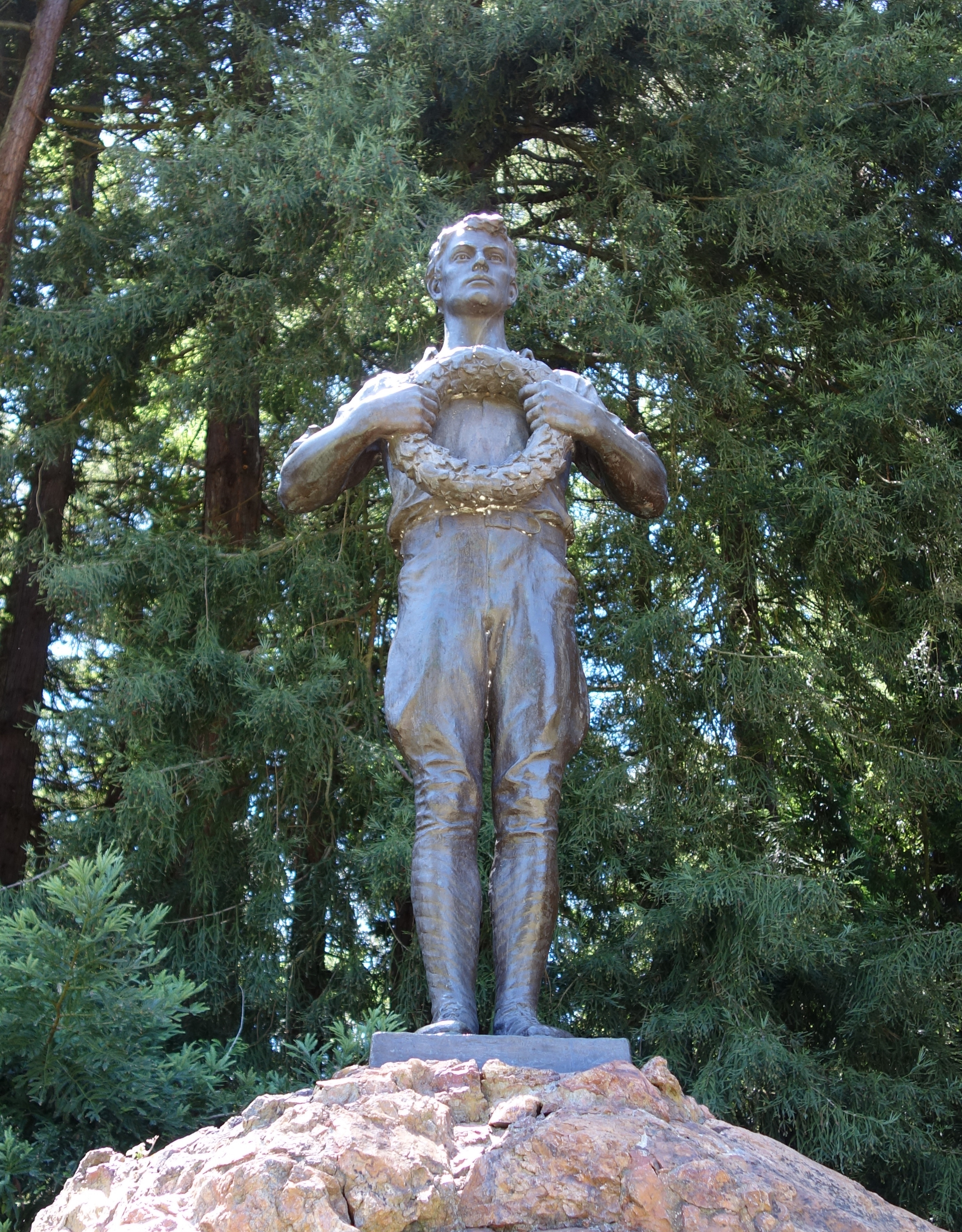
- The statue in 2014
- Location: San Francisco, California, U.S.
- 37°46′19.5″N 122°28′28.6″W

A statue of a doughboy by Melvin Earl Cummings is installed in San Francisco's Golden Gate Park, in the U.S. state of California.
