= John McLaren (horticulturist) =

Park superintendent in San Francisco (1847-1943)

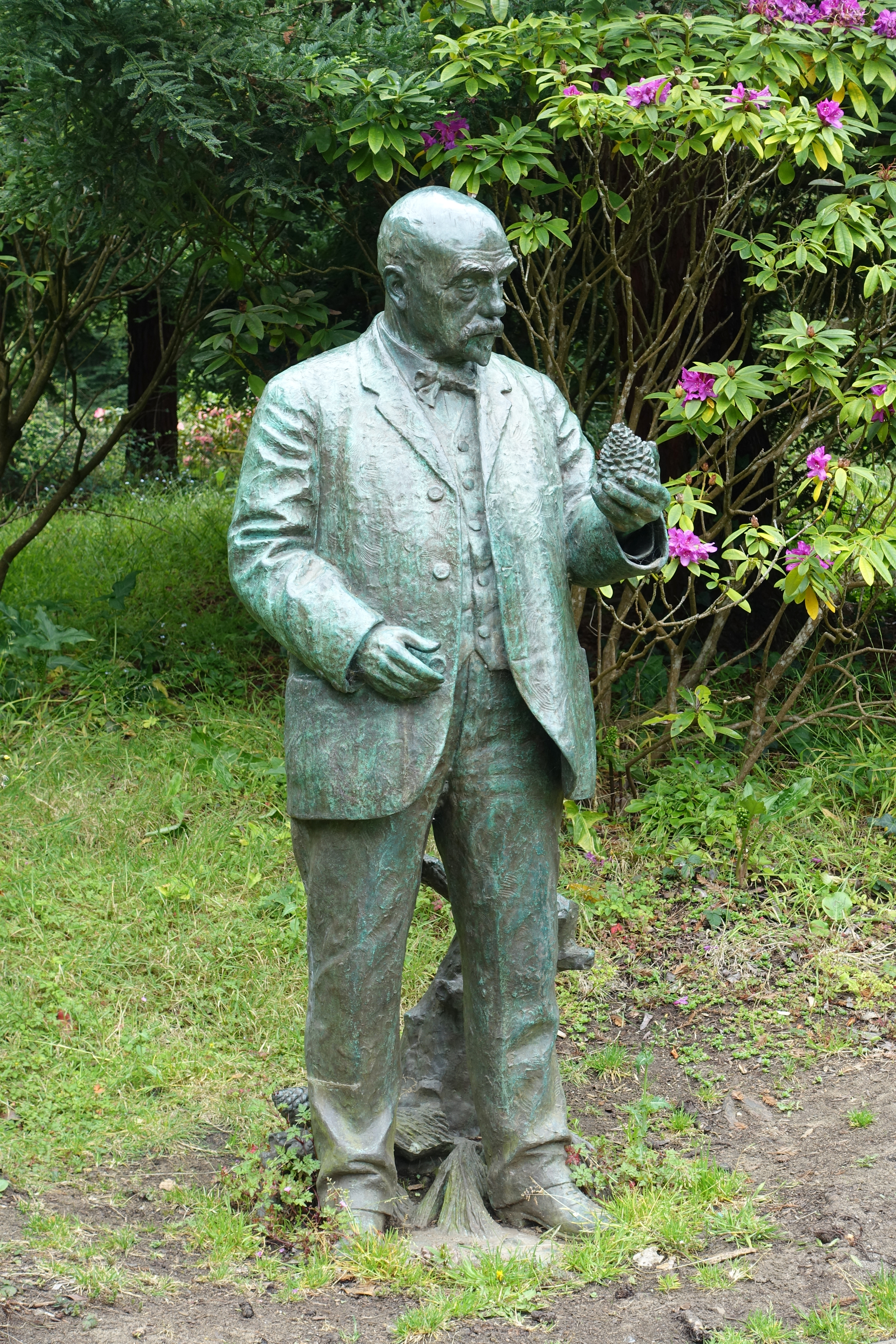
Statue of John McLaren, Golden Gate Park

John Hays McLaren (December 20, 1846 – January 12, 1943) was a Scottish-born American horticulturalist. For 53 years (1890–1943) he served as superintendent of Golden Gate Park in San Francisco, California.

== Early life ==
McLaren was born December 20, 1846, at Bannockburn, near Stirling in Scotland, and worked as a dairyman. He also worked in the gardens of Bannockburn House in Banockburn, before going to study horticulture at the Edinburgh Royal Botanical Gardens, where he worked as an apprentice gardener and planted grasses anchoring the beach dunes along the Firth of Forth. McLaren emigrated to the United States in 1870.

== Northern California ==
He worked on the George H. Howard estate in the San Mateo foothills in California, then on the Leland Stanford estate in Palo Alto, and planted trees on Coyote Point on the shore of San Francisco Bay. McLaren also designed Graceada Park in Modesto, California.

He was friends with John Muir and dedicated his life to vigorous advocacy and development of 1,017-acre (4.12 km^{2}) Golden Gate Park, one of the largest public parks in the world, using considerable political skill in addition to his remarkable gardening skill. Appointed park superintendent in 1890, replacing the park's designer William Hammond Hall, McLaren requested thirty thousand dollars a year for park building. One of his stipulations before taking the job was, "There will be no 'Keep off the Grass' signs." His horticultural philosophy was to achieve a natural look, typified in his dislike for statues, calling them "stookies" and planting trees and shrubs to hide them. He built two windmills to pump water to the park and had the sweepings from San Francisco streets delivered as fertilizer. When ocean waves and wind piled sand on the west end of the park, he began a forty-year effort to pile branches, clippings and laths on the shore to capture sand and build the great berm that now holds the Great Highway.

== Hanchett Residence Park and Hester Park, San Jose, California ==
In 1907 land developer Lewis Hanchett hired McLaren to design Hanchett Residence Park on the former 76-acre Agricultural Park bounded by Race Street, Park Avenue, the Alameda and Hester Avenue. McLaren is credited with creating San Jose's first residence park, which reflected certain architecture standards, sidewalks, street lamps, wide curved streets and gateway landmarks.

== Lithia Park, Ashland, Oregon ==
The small town of Ashland, Oregon, commissioned McLaren to design Lithia Park in 1914, just a few years after the park was established in 1908. Still considered the "crown jewel" of Ashland, the park covers 100 acres (0.4 km^{2}), extending from the center of town ("The Plaza") up Ashland Creek to the foothills of Mount Ashland. It includes two ponds, a Japanese garden, tennis courts, two public greens, a bandshell (outdoor stage) and miles of hiking trails. The name Lithia comes from the natural mineral water in Ashland, Lithia water. The world-famous Oregon Shakespeare Festival now borders the lower portion of the park. The surrounding watershed, which supplies drinking water and hydroelectricity to the city, also includes miles of mountain biking trails. The park is the start and finish for the annual Spring Thaw mountain biking race for pros and amateurs.

== San Jose Municipal Rose Garden ==
In 1931, McLaren, along with Dr J. Horace McFarland, president of the American Rose Society, and the City of San Jose's planning director, Michael H. Antonacci, drew up the original plans for the San Jose Municipal Rose Garden.

== Later life ==
McLaren had a shrewd and aggressive style of management but was so highly respected that, at the age of 70, he was given lifetime tenure over Golden Gate Park and his salary doubled. An avenue in the Sea Cliff district of San Francisco was named after him during his lifetime, and he was awarded an honorary doctorate by the University of California at Berkeley. He is credited with planting two million trees during his lifetime.

== Death and legacy ==
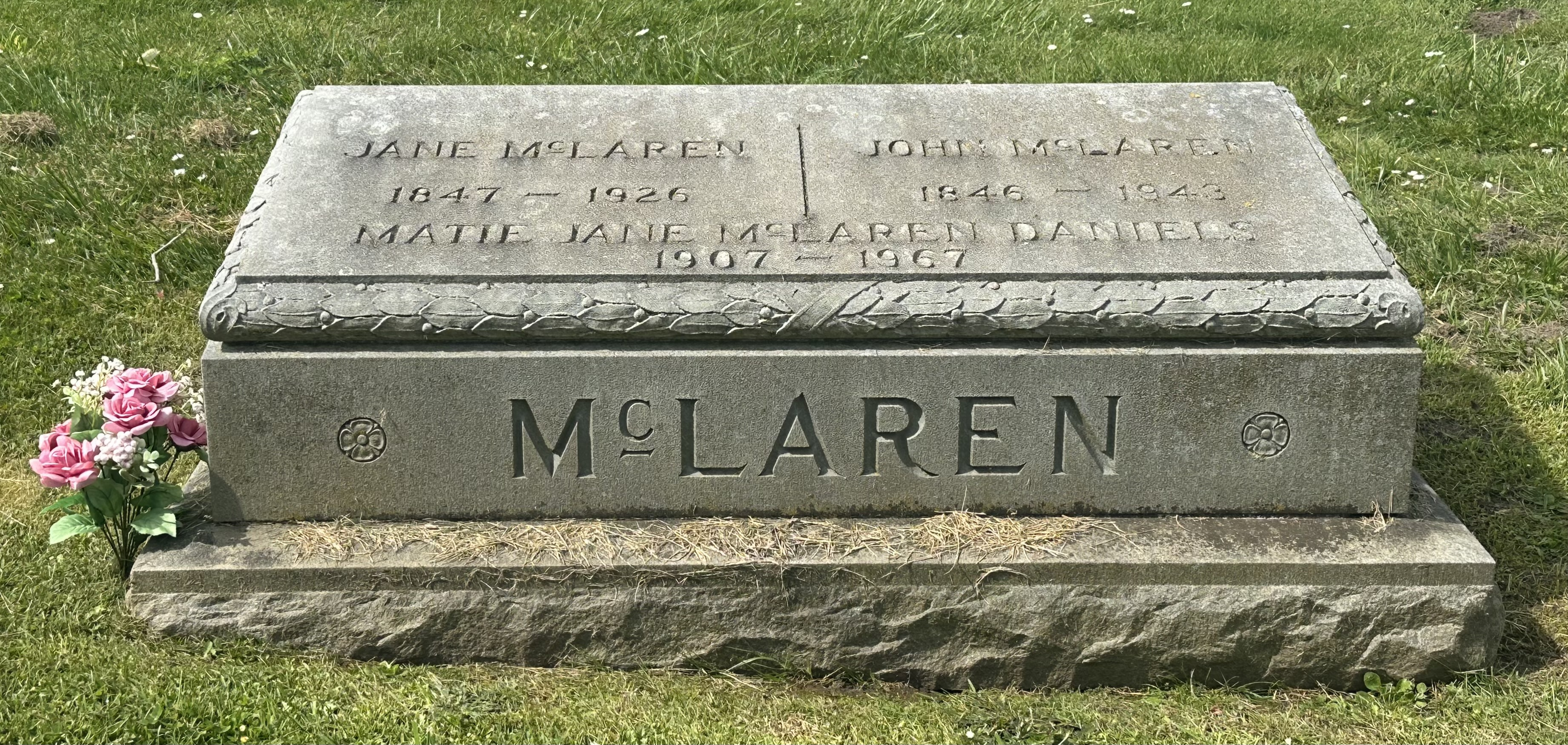
Grave of John McLaren

McLaren died January 12, 1943, in San Francisco, at the age of 96. His body lay in state in the San Francisco City Hall Rotunda. Afterwards, the funeral cortege drove his casket through Golden Gate Park as a special honor. He was buried in Colma at Cypress Lawn Memorial Park.

A small statue of McLaren was erected in the park in 1921, but within a year he hid it away. It was discovered after his death and installed in John McLaren Memorial Rhododendron Dell. McLaren Park in the southern part of San Francisco is named after John McLaren, as is McLaren Lodge in Golden Gate Park, where he lived until his death. Tilden Regional Park, in the East Bay, has a meadow named after McLaren.

== See also ==
- Golden Gate Park
- Graceada Park
- Landscape architecture
- John Muir
