= Statue of Robert Burns (San Francisco) =

Statue by Melvin Earl Cummings in California

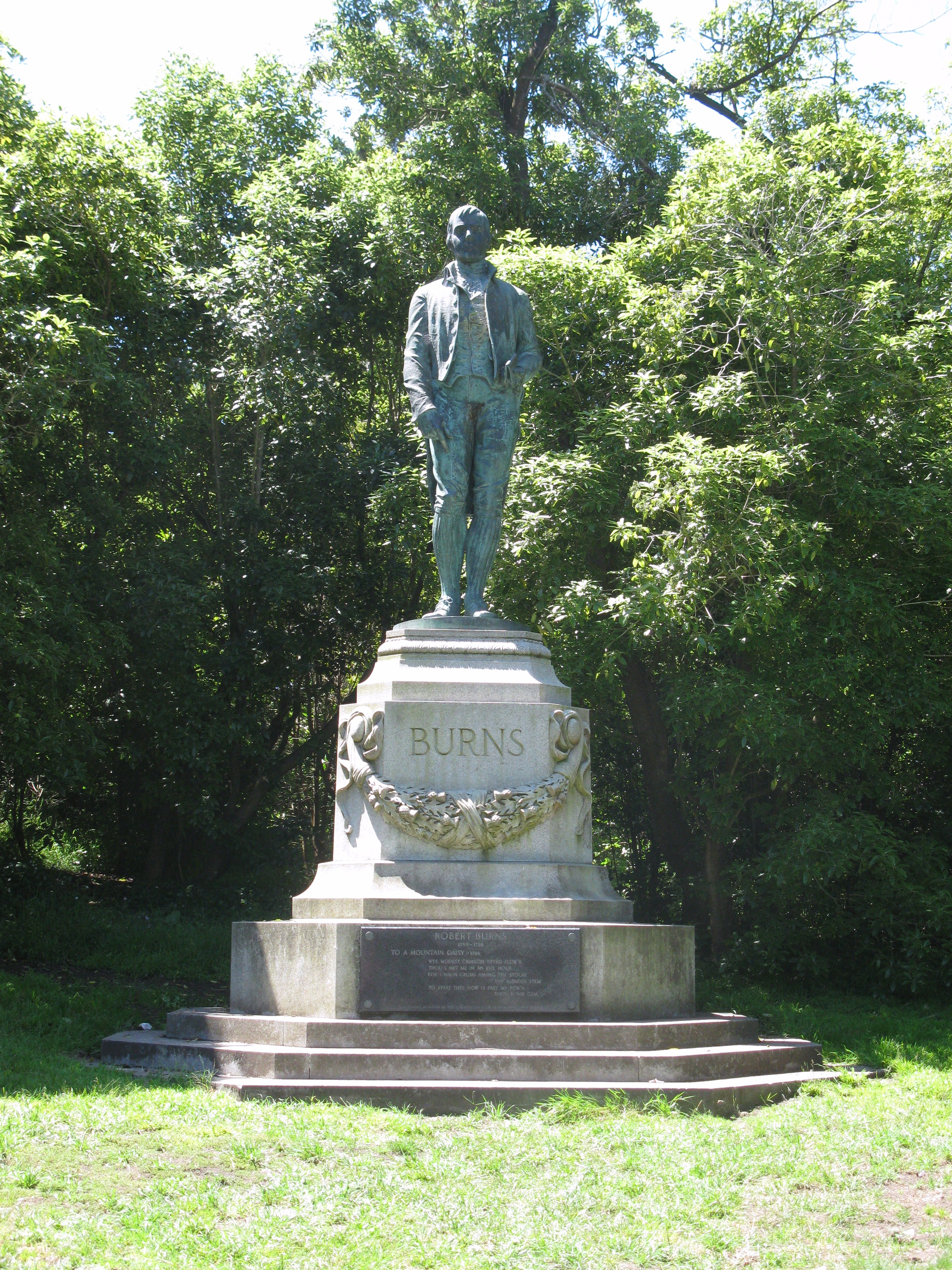
- The statue in 2011
- Artist: Melvin Earl Cummings
- Subject: Robert Burns
- Location: Golden Gate Park; San Francisco, California, U.S.; 37.77226°N 122.46550°W

A statue of Robert Burns by Melvin Earl Cummings is installed in San Francisco's Golden Gate Park, in the U.S. state of California.

== See also ==
- List of Robert Burns memorials
