= Statue of John McLaren =

Statue in San Francisco, California, U.S.

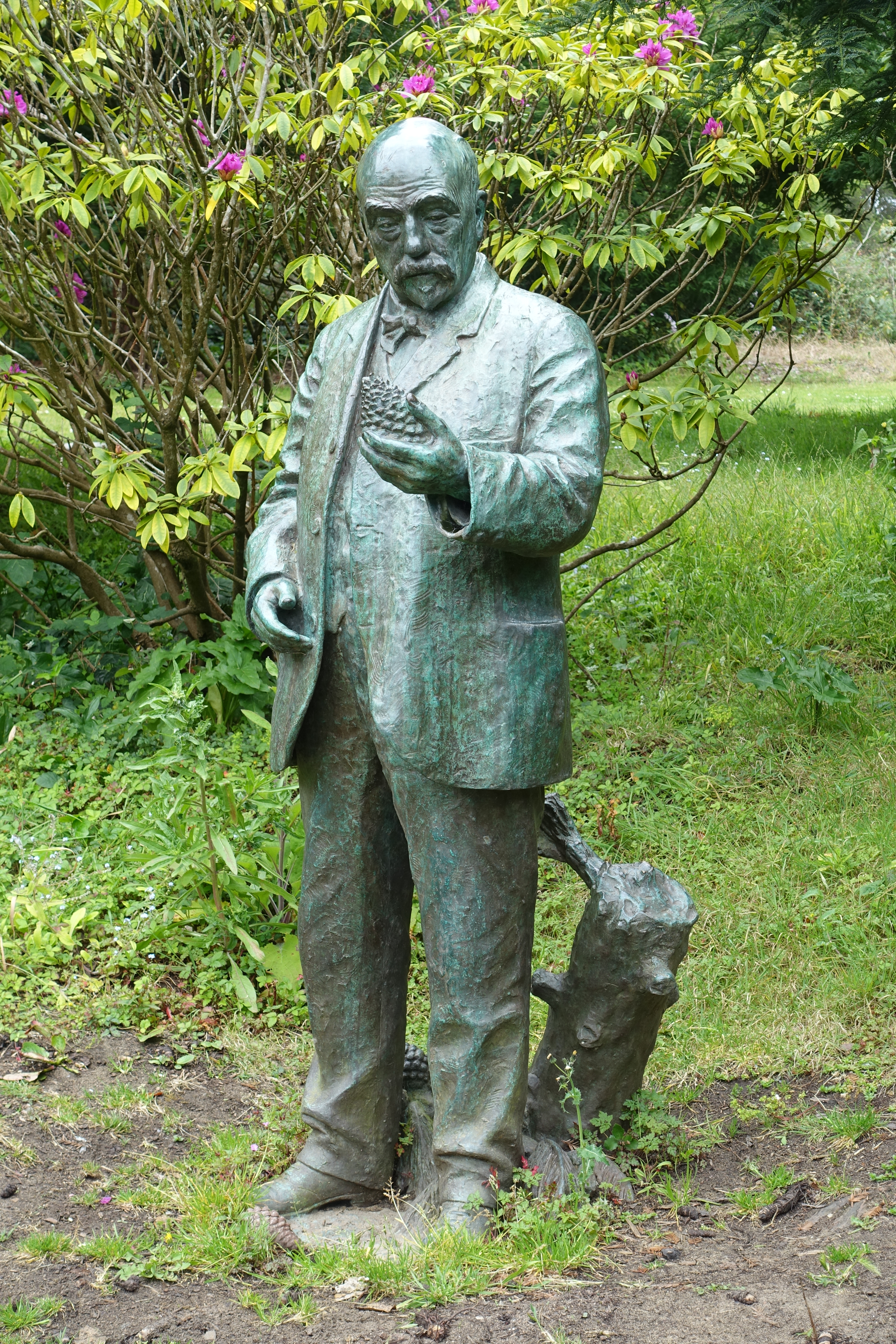
- The statue in 2015
- Subject: John McLaren
- Location: San Francisco, California, U.S.; 37.77208°N 122.46472°W

A statue of horticulturist John McLaren is installed in San Francisco's Golden Gate Park, in the U.S. state of California.

== Background ==
In 1911 Alma de Bretteville Spreckels and her husband Adolph B. Spreckels, park commissioner and namesake of Spreckels Lake, wanted M. Earl Cummings to capture McLaren's likeness. The San Francisco Examiner reported in 1911 that McLaren had modeled for Cummings, and the statue was to be shown at a Bohemian Club art exhibition. The Examiner reported in 1921 that park commissioners wanted the statue erected in Golden Gate Park "soon." But in 1922, according to the Oakland Tribune, McLaren hid it in a box in the park stables as "[he] did not want to see it".

The statue was found after McLaren's death in 1943 and erected in John McLaren Memorial Rhododendron Dell in 1945. It is a bronze 5'7" likeness. It does not sit on a pedestal and has no identification, as Cummings thought everybody would know who McLaren was. Over time the statue has turned green, so it is unassuming and blends into its surroundings. In one hand McLaren is holding a pine cone.

Saw marks are on his right leg from an attempt to steal the statue on December 17, 1953. Two attempts were made, in the first of which the thieves tried to "crowbar the statue off its base." Three days later, on what would have been McLaren's birthday, a hacksaw was used to try to cut the statue down.
