= Melvin Earl Cummings =

American sculptor (1876–1936)

Melvin Earl Cummings (August 13, 1876 – July 21, 1936), also known as M. Earl Cummings, was an American sculptor active in San Francisco, California.

== Biography ==
Melvin Earl Cummings was born on August 13, 1876, in Salt Lake City, Utah. At the age of 20, his entire family moved to San Francisco. He studied sculpture first at the Mark Hopkins Institute of Art in San Francisco, under Arthur Mathews and later Douglas Tilden, and subsequently from 1900 to 1903 at the École des Beaux-Arts, Paris, under Louis Noël and Antonin Mercié.

After his return to San Francisco, he became professor of sculpture at the Mark Hopkins Institute (now San Francisco Art Institute), which position he retained to 1915. In addition, in 1906 he was appointed instructor in modeling (and later promoted to assistant professor) in the University of California, Berkeley's School of Architecture, which position he held until his death. He was succeeded in his role at U.C. Berkeley by Jacques Schnier.

Cummings also served on San Francisco's Golden Gate Park Board of Park Commissioners from 1904 until his death, and several of his works are located in the park. His son, Ramy Ramsdale Cummings, was the model for his father's "Indian Boy" statue in the Pool of Enchantment grouping, and a Bohemian Club photographer.

== Selected works ==
- Statue of John McLaren at the John McLaren Memorial Rhododendron Dell, Golden Gate Park.
- The Doughboy at the Grove of Memory, Golden Gate Park.
- Statue of Robert Burns, Golden Gate Park.
- Pool of Enchantment, M. H. deYoung Memorial Museum, Golden Gate Park.
- Neptune's Daughter, Golden Gate Park.
- Sun Dial, Golden Gate Park.
- Becker Fountain, Golden Gate Park.
- Rideout Fountain, Golden Gate Park.
- Le Soif Fountain, Washington Square, San Francisco.
- Bas-relief of George Hearst, Mining Building, University of California.
- Portrait of General Richard W. Young, Capitol, Salt Lake City, Utah.
