= Jacques Schnier =

Romanian-born American artist, sculptor and author (1898–1988)

- Born: December 25, 1898; Constanța, Romania
- Died: March 8, 1988 (aged 89); Walnut Creek, California, U.S.
- Other name: Jacques Preston Schnier
- Education: Stanford University (AB); University of California, Berkeley (MA)
- Occupations: Artist, sculptor, author, educator, engineer
- Movement: Modernism
- Spouse: Dorothy Lilienthal
- Children: 2

Jacques Schnier (December 25, 1898 – March 8, 1988) was a Romanian-born American artist, sculptor, author, educator, and engineer. He was a sculpture professor at the University of California, Berkeley, from 1936 to 1966.

== Early life and education ==
Jacques Preston Schnier was born on December 25, 1898, in Constanța, Romania; and he moved to the United States with his family in 1903. Schnier was raised in San Francisco, California.

Schnier received his A.B. degree in engineering from Stanford University in 1920. After receiving his engineering degree, he worked as an engineer at the Hawaiian Sugar Plantation Company (also known as Makaweli Plantation) in Kauai, Hawaii, until 1923. Schnier then left engineering and earned an M.A. degree in sociology in 1939 from the University of California, Berkeley. During this time, he also started taking architecture classes.

== Career ==
=== Teaching and research ===
He was a professor of sculpture at UC Berkeley for over 30 years and he founded their sculpture department, working from 1936 to 1966. His first role at UC Berkeley was as a modeling instructor in the department of architecture, succeeding Melvin Earl Cummings. Schnier also taught at the School of Arts and Crafts in Oakland (now the California College of the Arts).

He conducted research on psychoanalysis and wrote books on the subject. Additionally he wrote about artists and art history.

=== Art ===
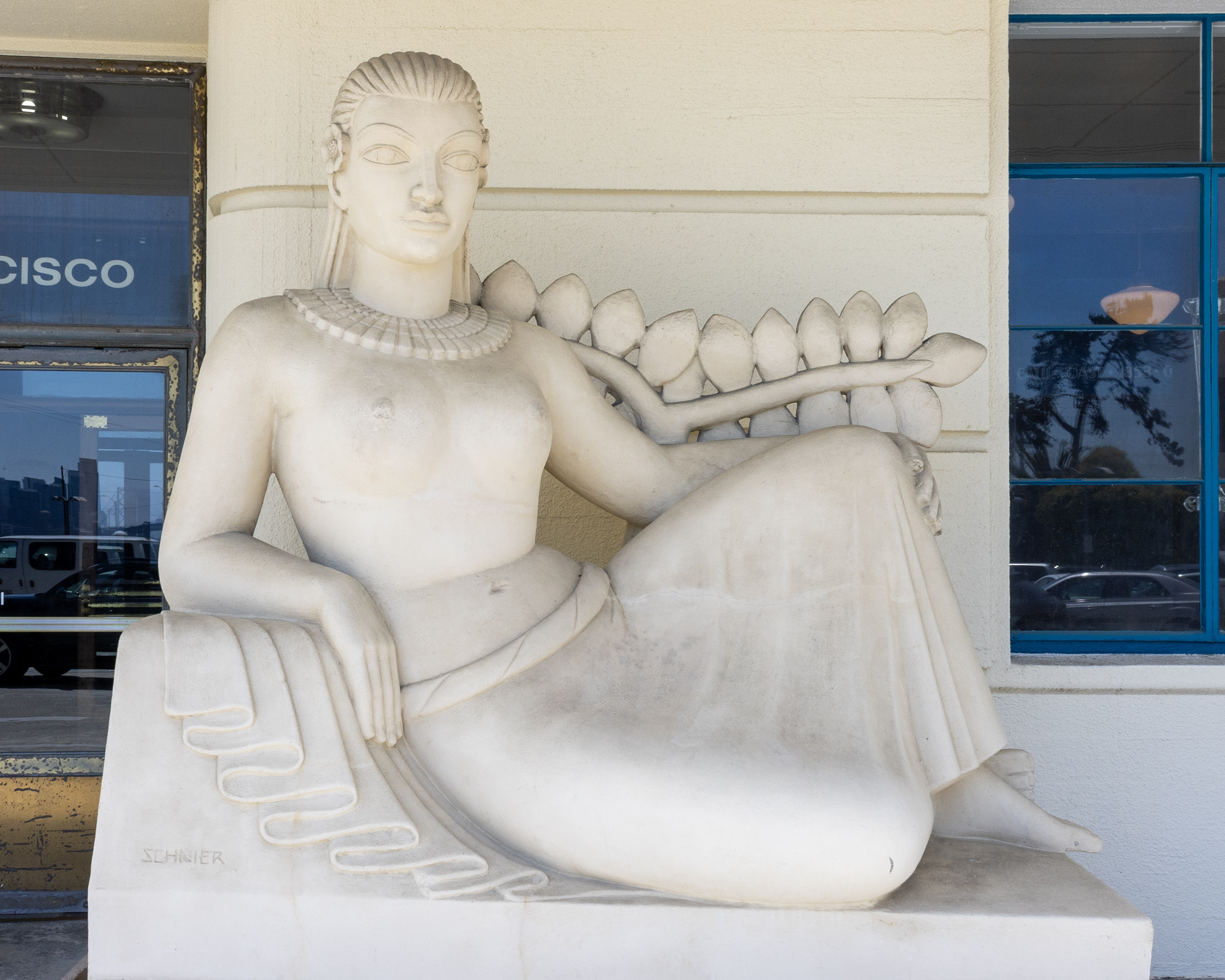
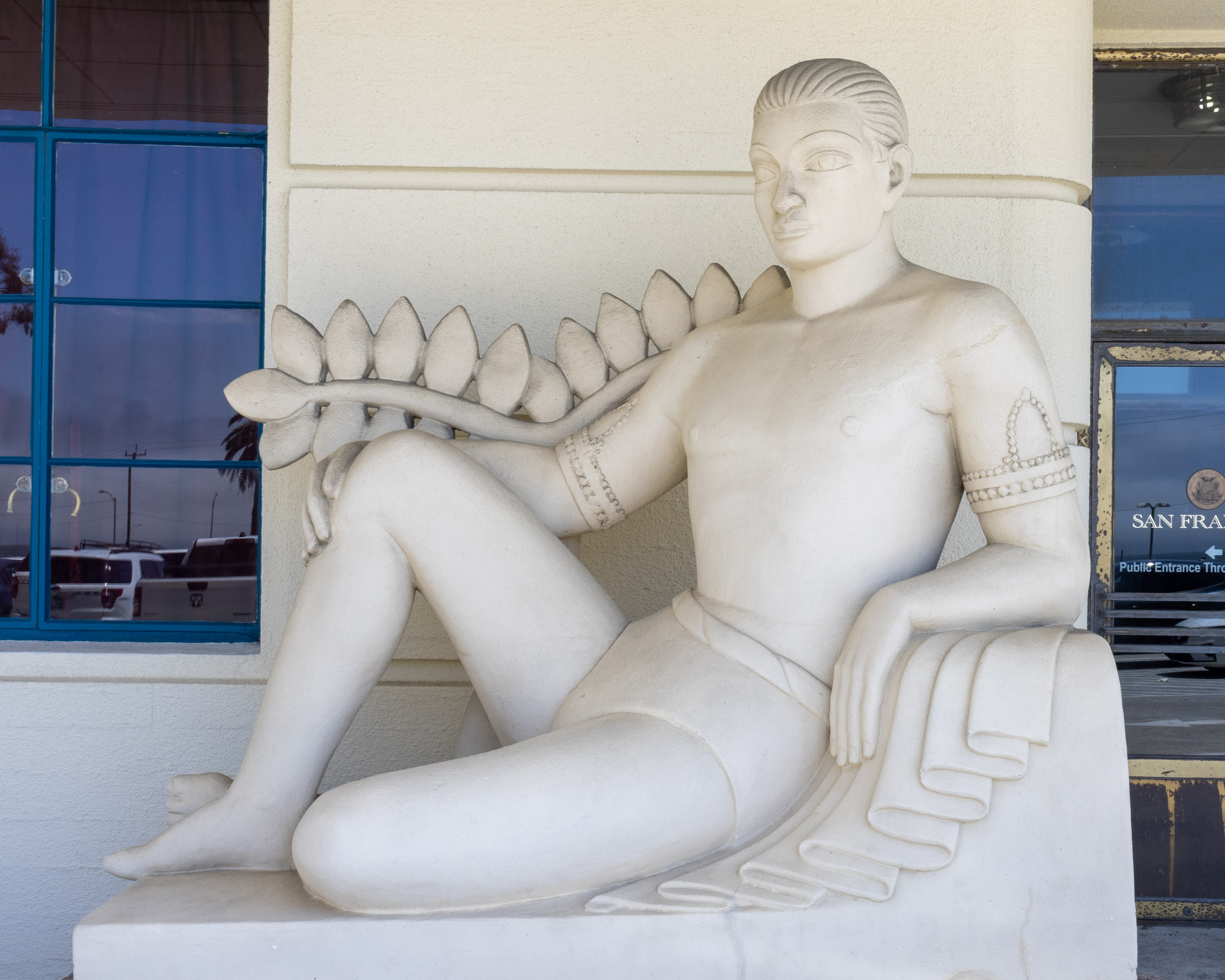
Spirit of India sculptures for the Golden Gate International Exposition

In 1927, the first news article about Schnier's artwork was published in The Argonaut by Junius Cravens. Schnier relationship with Albert M. Bender, a San Francisco patron of the arts, helped sustain his creative work. Schnier became known for modernist sculptures and mural painting. His work in the 1920s to mid-1940s was figurative; after serving in the United States Army during World War II his work became more abstract. In the 1960s, his work started to look more organic in shape.

In 1936, Schnier was commissioned by the United States Mint to design the San Francisco–Oakland Bay Bridge half-dollar, a commemorative coin that honored the opening of the San Francisco–Oakland Bay Bridge. The front of the coin featured a portrait of Monarch II, the last of the San Francisco–bred grizzly bears; and the back of the coin featured the Bay Bridge and the Ferry Building, as seen from San Francisco.

In 1939 to 1940, his work was part of the Golden Gate International Exposition (GGIE) on Treasure Island. Schnier had solo art exhibitions at the Magnes Collection of Jewish Art and Life (1971), Crocker Art Museum (1963), Stanford University Museum of Art (now Cantor Arts Center), The Art Institute of Seattle, the Santa Barbara Museum of Art, the Gallaudet University, and the Bedford Gallery at the Lesher Center for the Arts. His works were also displayed at the Philadelphia Museum of Art, the Dallas Museum of Art, Portland Art Museum, and the Museum of Contemporary Art, Los Angeles.

== Death and legacy ==
Schnier died in Walnut Creek, California, on March 8, 1988, at the age of 89. He was survived by his wife Dorothy Lilienthal, and two children.

Jacques' works are a part of public collections of the San Francisco Museum of Modern Art, the Fine Arts Museums of San Francisco, Oakland Museum of California, Santa Barbara Museum of Art, Smithsonian Institution, Crocker Art Museum, and Stanford University Museum of Art.

== Publications ==
- Schnier, Jacques (1948). Sculpture in Modern America. Berkeley and Los Angeles: University of California Press.

=== Art exhibition-related ===
- Schnier, Jacques (1965). Jacques Schnier: Sculptures (1961–1964) (exhibition). U.C. Berkeley Worth Ryder Gallery. Berkeley, CA: University of California Berkeley Press.
- Schnier, Jacques (1979). Selected Sculptures 1969–1979 (exhibition). Capricorn Asunder Gallery. San Francisco, CA: San Francisco Art Commission.
- Fort, Ilene Susan (1998). Jacques Schnier, Art Deco & Beyond: 60 Years of Sculpture (exhibition). Mills College of Art Museum. Mills College of Art Museum. ISBN 978-0963803030.

== Exhibitions ==
- 1949 – solo exhibition, Oakland Art Gallery (now Oakland Museum of California), Oakland, California
- 1963 – solo exhibition and retrospective, E. B. Crocker Gallery (now Crocker Museum), Sacramento, California
- 1971 – "Transparencies and Reflections", solo exhibition, Judah L. Magnes Museum (now the Magnes Collection of Jewish Art and Life), Berkeley, California
- 1975 – "Refractions and Reflections", solo exhibition, James Willis Gallery, San Francisco, California
