= Victor Martyn Lynch-Staunton Award =

Canadian artists award

- Description: Award for outstanding Canadian artists in their mid-career
- Country: Canada
- Presented by: Canada Council for the Arts

The Victor Martyn Lynch-Staunton Award is a monetary award given since 1971 by the Canada Council for the Arts to Canadian artists judged to be outstanding in their mid-careers.

Since 2005, the award is given to one recipient in each of the following seven fields: dance, inter-arts, media arts, music, theatre, visual arts and writing and publishing. The award, worth Cdn$15,000 (CAD), was founded by Victor Martyn Lynch-Staunton in 1967.

Until 2005, the award was given usually to 3-4 people in the fields of visual arts (including sculpture) and music, though not in both fields every year. Once, in 1986, it included a "dance teacher and historian", as well as a "critic and curator"; once, in 1971, it included a "weaver", and once, in 1981, it included a "harpsichord builder". In 2004, it was not awarded at all.

== Laureates ==
Year	Laureates
2017	Marcus Youssef, Amanda Strong, Vladimir "7Starr" Laurore, Kevin Lau, Bruno Bouchard, Kevin Schmidt, Yara El-Ghadban
2016	Félix Beaulieu-Duchesneau, Duane Linklater, Louise Moyes, Chloe Charles, Stephen Thompson, Cedric Bomford, Karen Solie
2015	Judd Palmer, Myriam Yates, Ame Henderson, John Korsrud, M. Nourbe Philip, Mathieu Latulippe, Herve Desbois
2014	Olivier Choinière, Martin Messier, Kevin Anthony Ormsby, André Ristic, Alain Veilleux, Hajra Waheed, Robert Anthony Wright
2013	Lindsay McIntyre, Trevor Cole, Benjamin Wendel, Donna-Michelle St. Bernard, Julie Desrosiers, Sandra Laronde, Reece Terris
2012	Manon DePauw, Graeme Patterson, Sylvia Legris, Valérie Blass, Denis Lavalou, Brian Current, Nova Bhattacharya
2011	Nadine Sures, Diane Morin, Duncan Thornton, Osvaldo Jose Ramirez Castillo, Naomi Campbell, Paul Steenhuisen, Yvonne Chartrand
2010	Kristen Fahrig, Samer Najari, Philippe Gaulin, Tricia Middleton, Dominick Parenteau-Lebeuf, Analia Llugdar, Randy Joynt
2009	Jackson 2bears, Adad Hannah, André Girard, Tammy Forsythe, Kirk MacDonald, Drew H. Taylor, 2boys.tv
2008	Susanna Hood, Diane Borsato, Shandi Mitchell, Michael Oesterle, Linda Brunelle, Geoffrey Farmer, Marlene Cookshaw
2007	Chanti Wadge, Daniel Barrow, Zoe Leigh Hopkins, Teresa Doyle, Ahdri Zhina Mandiela, BGL, Jocelyn Boisvert
2006	Santee Smith, Robin Brass, Pascale Ferland, Bradley Turner, Larry Tremblay, Ron Terada, Peter Knudtson
2005	Janice Bowhay, Irene Laughlin, Rebecca Belmore, Jane Siberry, Lois Brown, Jean-Pierre Gauthier, Lynn Coady
2003	Alcides Lanza, Jean Beaudet, Rosalie Favell
2002	John Wyre, Ian Carr-Harris, Francine Larivée
2001	René Lussier, Rodney Sharman, Yvon Cozic
2000	Nobuo Kubota, Eric Metcalfe, Sergio Barroso
1999	Robert Murray McConnell, Paul Dolden
1998	Judith Schwarz, Edward Poitras, Harry Freedman
1997	Almeta Speaks, Francis Dhomont, Evan Grant Penny
1996	Christian Calon, Melvin Charney, John Oswald, Jaan Poldaas
1995	Mowry Baden, John Burke, Roland Poulin
1994	Geneviève Cadieux, Robin Collyer, Alexina Louie
1993	Denis Gougeon, Jana Sterbak, Jeffrey Wall
1992	Eric Cameron, Jacques Hurtubise, Victor Vogel
1991	Geoffrey James, Robert McConnell, Joey Morgan
1990	Lynne Cohen, Rivka Golani, Michael A. Fernandes
1989	Irene Whittome, Peter Paul Koprowski
1988	Jocelyne Alloucherie, Norma Beecroft
1987	Paterson Ewen, John Greer, Ann Kipling, Gilles Mihalcean
1986	Yves Cousineau, Evergon, Harlan House, Ronald Moppett, Elke Town, Shirley Wiitasalo
1985	Joseph Fafard, Royden Rabinowitch, Pauline Vaillancourt
1984	Stephen Cruise, Jacqueline Fry, Harry Freedman, Arnaud Maggs
1983	Tom Graff, June Leaf, Françoise Sullivan, Gabriel Charpentier
1982	Louis de Niverville, Maryvonne Kendergi, Sam Tata
1981	Vera Frenkel, Betty Goodwin, Liz Magor
1980	Raffi Armenian, Douglas Bentham, Gilles Tremblay
1979	Patricia Beatty, Ronald Martin, Henry Saxe
1978	Iain Baxter&, Jacques Hétu, Claude Jutra
1977	Norma Beecroft, Murray Favro, Fernand Leduc, Mark Prent
1976	Micheline Coulombe, Mireille Lagacé, Jean McEwen, David Rabinowitch
1975	Graham Coughtry, Roger Matton, Walter Redinger, R. Murray Schafer
1974	Gershon Iskowitz, Bruce Mather, Claude Tousignant, John Weinzweig
1973	Jack Chambers, Roy Kiyooka, Edward Turner
1972	Guido Molinari, Marcel Barbeau, Ronald Bloore, Joyce Wieland, Micheline Beauchemin
1971	Bruno Bobak, Charles Daudelin, Reginald Holmes, John Meredith
