= Serge Lemoyne =

Canadian artist (1941–1998)

- Quebecois Canadian artist Serge Lemoyne
- Born: June 13, 1941
- Died: July 12, 1998 (aged 57)
- Occupation: Artist

Serge Lemoyne (French pronunciation: [sɛʁʒ ləmwan]; June 13, 1941 – July 12, 1998) was a Canadian artist from Quebec. He worked as a performance artist as well as creating paintings, assemblages and prints. Lemoyne explored themes such as the environment, technology, and social justice. Lemoyne's work was exhibited in Canada and internationally, and he received numerous awards throughout his career. He died in 1998 at the age of 57.

== Work ==
Lemoyne studied at the École des beaux-arts de Montréal from 1958 to 1960. He cited as early influences Les Automatistes and the Plasticiens.

Lemoyne had a collaborative approach to making art, seeking active engagement between artwork, audience and the artist. He helped found L'Horloge du Nouvel-Age in 1964 with Claude Péloquin, Yves Hébert and Jean Gauguet-Larouche and a year later, Le Zirmate. Both groups held events combining music, poetry, dance and visual effects to create happenings.

Popular culture was a significant subject of his work—he devoted ten years to exploring hockey. bleu, blanc, rouge is a tribute to the Montreal Canadiens whose uniforms are these colors. Blue, white and red are also the colours found in the flags of France and the United Kingdom—the two language heritages that both unite and divide Canada. Perhaps Lemoyne's best-known work is Dryden, an understated portrait of the goalie mask belonging to Montreal Canadiens star goaltender Ken Dryden.

A 2001 exhibition organized by Musée régional de Rimouski, Greg Curnoe, Serge Lemoyne : deux nationalismes? paired the francophone Lemoyne's body of work with that of the anglophone Greg Curnoe.

In 2008—ten years after the artist's death, the Musée des beaux-arts de Sherbrooke (Sherbrooke) organized Salut Lemoyne! an exhibition of work by Lemoyne together with the works of other Quebec artists with whom he was associated, including Armand Vaillancourt, Pierre Gauvreau, Janine Carreau, Hélène Goulet, Reynald Connolly, Cozic, François Gauthier, Gilles Boisvert, and Serge Tousignant.

Art contemporain en fin de siècle (1994), produced by Jacques Larré, profiled Lemoyne, as well as the photographer Geneviève Cadieux and the artist and architect Melvin Charney. Lemoyne : documentaire sur la vie et l'oeuvre du peintre Serge Lemoyne (2005) examines Lemoyne's approach to creating art through personal videos, television archives and interviews with his peers, Claude Péloquin, Marcel Saint-Pierre and Claude Jasmin.

The commemorative envelope for the postage stamp to celebrate the Montreal Museum of Fine Arts issued by Canada Post on September 26, 2011 features a portion of Lemoyne's work Dryden (1975).

== Life ==
Lemoyne was born on 13 June 1941 in Acton Vale, Quebec. He died on 12 July 1998 in Saint-Hyacinthe, Quebec.
