= Lucie Duval =

Canadian artist

- Born: 1959 (age 66–67); Mont-Laurier, Quebec
- Known for: sculptor
- Website: lucieduval.com

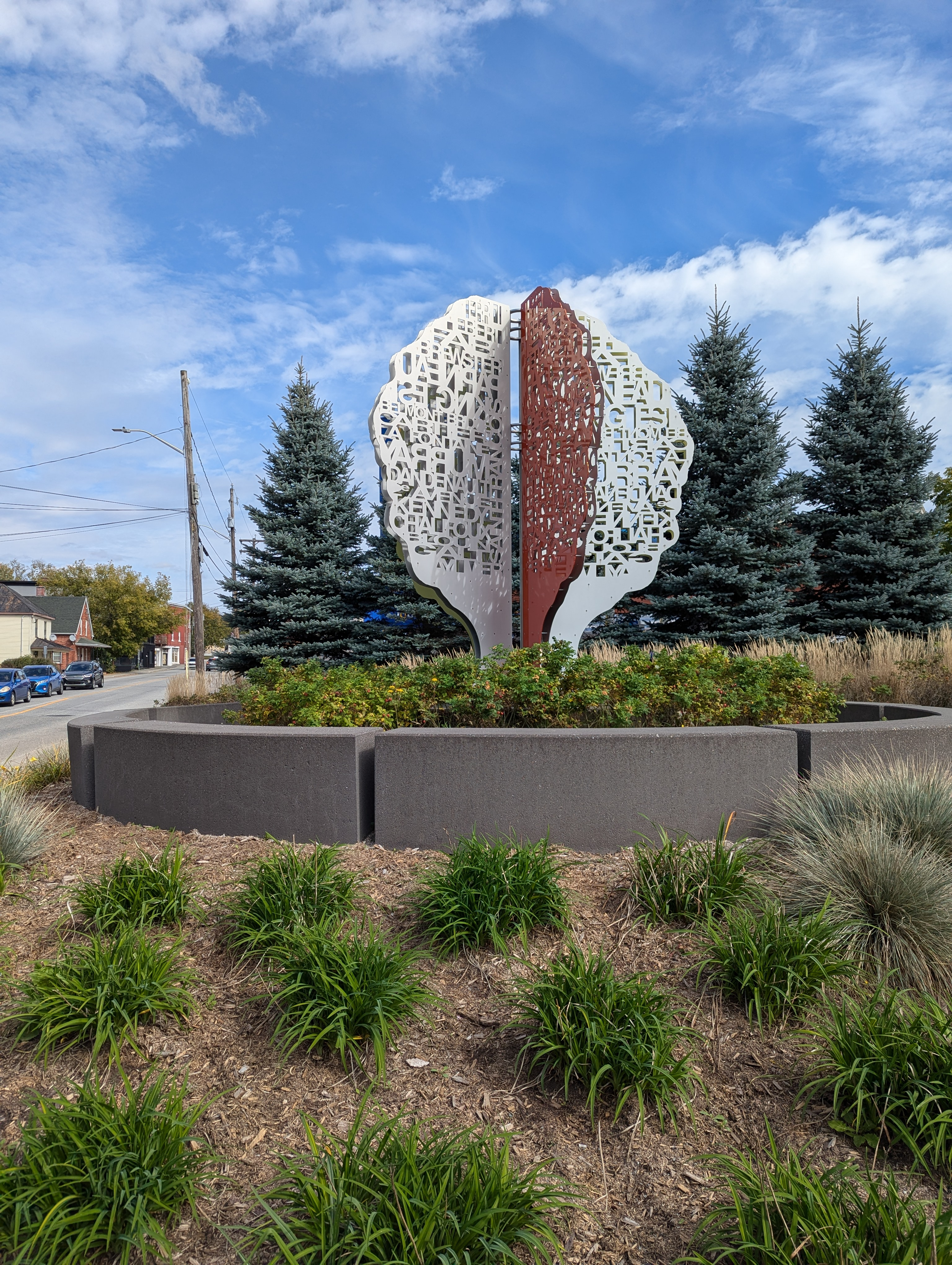
Mémoire vive, a sculpture by Lucie Duval located in Sherbrooke, QC

Lucie Duval (born 1959) is a Canadian artist.

Her 2004 work À la croisée des mots is installed outside the Georges Vanier public library in Montreal. Her work is included in the collection of the Musée national des beaux-arts du Québec and the City of Montreal public art collection.

Her 2013 work of public art, the sculpture Mémoire vive, is located in Sherbrooke, QC.

== See also ==
- Betty Goodwin
- Lisette Lemieux
