= Arnarsson =

Arnarsson is an Icelandic-language masculine surname. Notable people with the surname include:

- Arnar Freyr Arnarsson (born 1996), Icelandic handball player
- Ingólfur Arnarsson (born 1956), Icelandic artist
- Viktor Bjarki Arnarsson (born 1983), Icelandic footballer
