= Lisette Lemieux =

Canadian artist and sculptor

- Born: 1943 (age 82–83); Arthabaska, Quebec, Canada
- Education: Université du Québec à Montréal (M.A., 1980)
- Known for: Sculpture, installation art
- Awards: Grand Prix de la Biennale du dessin, de l'estampe et du papier-matière du Québec (1995)

Lisette Lemieux is a Quebec visual artist born in 1943 in Arthabaska, Quebec. She lives and works in Montreal. Her practice centers primarily on sculpture and installation art.

== Biography ==
Lemieux trained in education, art history, and visual arts, completing a master's degree from the Université du Québec à Montréal in 1980. She taught within the school system and later at the university level, notably at UQAM from 1979 to 2015.

== Artistic practice ==
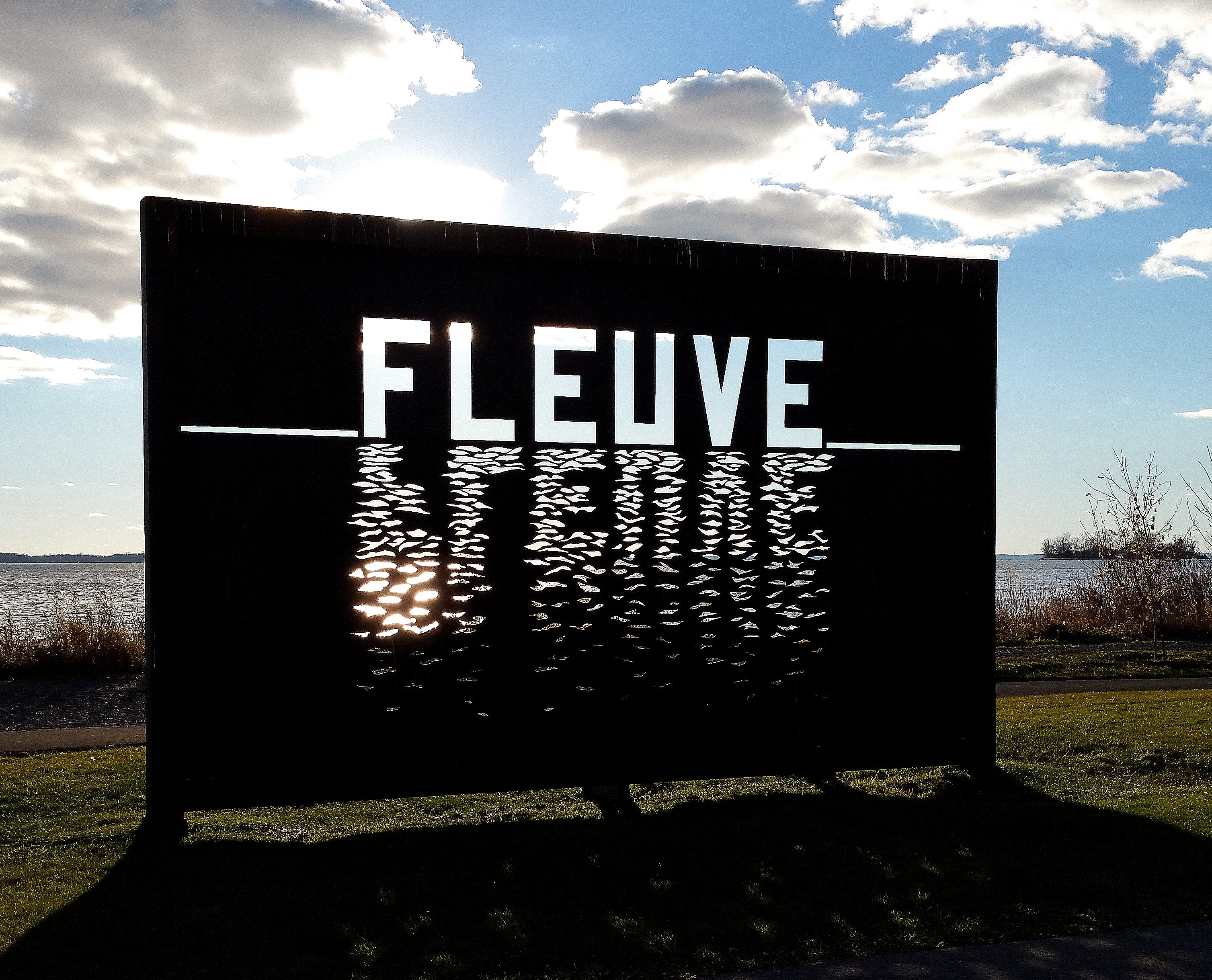
Regard sur le fleuve by Lisette Lemieux on the banks of the Saint Lawrence River in Lachine

Her work explores light as both a perceptual phenomenon and a material, as well as language, through the integration of words and signs into her pieces. · Lemieux also uses everyday objects and materials, which she recontextualizes in sculptures and installations.

== Activities and awards ==
Lemieux has taken part in various symposia and conferences related to visual arts and glass. In 1995, she received the Grand Prix of the Biennale du dessin, de l'estampe et du papier-matière du Québec. She has also created public art integration works and interdisciplinary collaborations, including LIBER (2008), presented to UNESCO.

Her work is held in several public permanent collections, including the Musée d'art contemporain de Montréal and the Musée national des beaux-arts du Québec.

== See also ==
- Contemporary art
- Betty Goodwin
- Francine Larivée
- Lucie Duval
- Serge Tousignant
