= Gershon Iskowitz =

Polish-born Jewish Canadian artist (1921-1988)

- Born: November 24, 1919; Kielce, Poland
- Died: January 26, 1988 (aged 68)
- Education: Akademie der Bildenden Künste München
- Known for: Painter
- Notable work: Uplands E (1971), Action (1941), Self-portrait (c.1955)

Gershon Iskowitz RCA (November 24, 1919 – January 26, 1988) was a Canadian artist of Jewish background originally from Poland. Iskowitz was a Holocaust survivor of the Kielce Ghetto, who was liberated at Buchenwald. The circumstances of his early life—the trauma of the Holocaust and the uncertainty of the immediate postwar period, followed by immigration and adaptation to Canada—provide a lens through which to understand and appreciate his work. His early figurative images represent his tragic observed and remembered experiences while his later luminous abstract works represent his own unique vision of the world. Iskowitz's work does not easily fit into contemporary schools and movements, but it has been characterized as hard-edge, minimalist, abstract expressionist, and action painting.

== Early life ==
Iskowitz was born in Kielce, in the Second Polish Republic. His father was Shmiel Yankl, generally referred to as Jankel; his mother was Zisla Lewis. Gershon was the third of four children; he had two brothers, Itchen and Yosl, and a younger sister, Devorah. At the age of four he was sent to a yeshiva in Lublin. He became bored and began drawing. After a year and a half he begged his father to be allowed to return home and was given permission to do so. He was tutored in Polish and placed in a public school. After two and a half years his father set up a small studio area for him in their home and allowed him to spend his time drawing and painting. At the age of nine he exchanged original art posters for free admission to a local cinema.

== World War II ==
He was accepted at the Academy of Fine Arts in Warsaw in 1939 and arranged to live with an uncle in the city, but a few days later, the German Army invaded the city and Iskowitz returned to Kielce. The Nazi persecution of the country's Jewish population began almost immediately. On March 31, 1941, the occupying forces established the Kielce Ghetto, a few square blocks surrounded by barbed-wire-topped walls and locked gates. The Iskowitz family and all the other Jews in the city were forced to live there. They were soon joined by Jews transported from elsewhere in Poland for "containment," and by August 1942, more than 25,000 people were jammed into this squalid area. In September 1943, the Kielce Ghetto was burned. Gershon and his brother, Yosl, were sent to Auschwitz.

Gershon painted or drew at night only after every one else was asleep. He said "Why did I do it? I think it kept me alive. There was nothing to do. I had to do something in order to forget the hunger. It's very hard to explain, but in the camp painting was a necessity for survival." He was transferred to Buchenwald in the fall of 1944. Near the end of the war he tried to escape but was seriously wounded. After the April 11 liberation of Buchenwald he was sent to recuperate in hospitals for about nine months.

From January to May 1947, he attended the Academy of Fine Arts Munich and had private study with Oskar Kokoschka who painted in an intense expressionistic style.

== Life in Canada ==
Gershon's first application to move to Canada was rejected because he had a limp. "Always when my life was in danger," Iskowitz found "I did a drawing and pulled through." He reapplied and drew a picture for the bureaucrat in immigration. The fellow declared Gershon a genius, predicted a great future for him in Canada, approved his emigration application and said that Gershon would have special privileges on the voyage to his new home. Thus in 1949 he emigrated to Canada to stay with relatives living in Toronto.

== Early career ==
In 1952, he attended the Artist's Workshop, Toronto (until 1959–1960) and began sketching trips to Markham and Uxbridge. He had his first exhibition with the Canadian Society of Graphic Art (CSGA) in 1954, submitting two works for $300 CAD each. Iskowitz continued to exhibit regularly with the society for the next 9 years. Through his participation with the CSGA, Iskowitz befriended influential artists in the Toronto region, even exhibiting with members of the prestigious Painters Eleven. In 1954, he began attending a series of painting summer schools run by Bert Weir, where artists mentored students in McKellar, Ontario in exchange for food and lodgings.

10 years after he began attending the Artist's Workshop, Iskowitz was able to afford his own studio space, a two room apartment along Spadina Avenue in Toronto. While working out of his Spadina studio in the early 1960s, Iskowitz exhibited at new spaces in the city, holding his first solo exhibition at the Hayter Gallery in 1957.

Gershon said "there was that period after '65 for a while when people would say, 'Do you still paint?' and I'd say, 'Yes, yes, I still paint.' And they'd say painting is dead, you know. Or if they didn't say that they'd say, 'Why don't you use acrylics?' Well, I tried them, but I stayed with oils, and the watercolours I'd been doing since I was a kid. It doesn't matter what you use, it matters how you use it."

== Abstraction and Northern Canada ==
There is no definitive date at which Iskowitz evolved into abstract and non-representational painting, but by the mid-1960s his work had taken on a largely different character. Inspired by a conversation with photographer John Reeves, Iskowitz grew an interest in "aerial perspectives." On a Canada Council travel grant in 1967, Iskowitz chartered an aircraft to view the coast of the Hudson Bay, an encounter which a significant mark on the artist's practice.

As Iskowitz grew successful working in abstract painting, he returned to the sub-Arctic for numerous study trips. In 1971, he visited James Bay, and returned to Yellowknife in both 1973 and 1975. Following his encounters with northern Canada, Iskowitz' art grew less representational. A lover of music, Iskowitz often harmonized the classical melodies he played in the studio with his compositions, producing series like Seasons, a set of diptych oil paintings.

== Later career and death ==
In 1982, Gershon was honoured by the Art Gallery of Ontario (AGO) with a 40-year retrospective of his work. A subset of the exhibition was put on display in London, England. Gershon said [painting] "... is just an extension of myself. It's a plastic interpretation of the way I think. You reflect your own vision. That's what it's all about. Art is like evolution and life, and you've got to search for life, stand on your own feet and continue. The only fear I have is before starting to paint. When I paint, I'm great, I feel great."

In gratitude for the value that artistic grants had given to his career he established the charitable not-for-profit Gershon Iskowitz Foundation in 1985. Its mandate was to award the annual Gershon Iskowitz Prize, in association with the Canada Council in 1986 and 1987, of $25,000 to mature artists. The Foundation awarded the prize on its own from 1988 to 2006. It then partnered with the AGO in 2007 to award this prize as the winner would then receive an exhibition at the AGO.

He was made a member of the Royal Canadian Academy of Arts. On January 26, 1988, Gershon Iskowitz died in Toronto, Ontario.

== Works in public collections in Canada ==
Over the years, many public art galleries have acquired, through purchase and donation, works by Gershon Iskowitz. Beginning in the mid-1960s, his work received critical attention and was shown in solo and group exhibitions nationally and internationally. In addition, in 1995 in celebration of the Prize's 10th Anniversary the Foundation donated over one hundred and forty paintings and works on paper to many of these same institutions. The works have been included in major exhibitions and many are exhibited as part of the Permanent Collections of these institutions.

Institution	City	Province
Agnes Etherington Art Centre	Kingston	ON
Art Gallery of Alberta	Edmonton	AB
Art Gallery of Greater Victoria	Victoria	BC
Art Gallery of Hamilton	Hamilton	ON
Art Gallery of Nova Scotia	Halifax	NS
Art Gallery of Ontario	Toronto	ON
Art Gallery of Peterborough	Peterborough	ON
Art Gallery of Windsor	Windsor	ON
Art Gallery of York University	Toronto	ON
Beaverbrook Art Gallery	Fredericton	NB
Carleton University Art Gallery	Ottawa	ON
Confederation Centre of the Arts	Charlottetown	PEI
Glenbow Museum	Calgary	AB
Justina M. Barnicke Gallery at Hart House; University of Toronto	Toronto	ON
Kitchener-Waterloo Art Gallery	Kitchener	ON
Leonard and Bina Ellen Art Gallery; Concordia University	Montreal	QC
Art Gallery of Guelph	Guelph	ON
MacKenzie Art Gallery	Regina	SK
MacLaren Art Centre	Barrie	ON
McMaster Museum of Art	Hamilton	ON
McMichael Canadian Art Collection	Kleinberg	ON
Montreal Museum of Fine Arts	Montreal	QC
Morris and Helen Belkin Art Gallery, UBC	Vancouver	BC
Musée d'art de Joliette	Joliette	QC
Musée national des beaux-arts du Québec	Québec	QC
Museum London	London	ON
Museum of Contemporary Canadian Art	Toronto	ON
National Gallery of Canada	Ottawa	ON
Nickle Galleries	Calgary	AB
Owens Art Galler; Mount Allison University	Sackville	NB
Robert McLaughlin Gallery	Oshawa	ON
Rodman Hall Arts Centre	St. Catharines	ON
The Rooms Provincial Art Gallery	St. John’s	NFLD
University of Lethbridge Art Gallery	Lethbridge	AB
University College; University of Toronto	Toronto	ON
Vancouver Art Gallery	Vancouver	BC
Winnipeg Art Gallery	Winnipeg	MA

== One-man exhibitions ==
The following table summarizes Iskowitz's one-man exhibitions:

Year	Venue	City	Prov / State
1960-1	Here and Now Gallery	Toronto	Ontario
1961	YMHA	Toronto	Ontario
1963	Dorothy Cameron Gallery	Toronto	Ontario
1964	Gallery Moos	Toronto	Ontario
1966	Gallery Moos	Toronto	Ontario
1967	Waterloo University	Waterloo	Ontario
1967	Gallery Moos	Toronto	Ontario
1969	Gallery Moos	Toronto	Ontario
1970	Gallery Moos	Toronto	Ontario
1971	Gallery Moos	Toronto	Ontario
1973	Hart House	Toronto	Ontario
1973	Gallery Moos	Toronto	Ontario
1973	Rodman Hall Arts Centre	St. Catharines	Ontario
1972	Galerie Allen	Vancouver	British Columbia
1974	Gallery Moos	Toronto	Ontario
1975	Glenbow-Alberta Institute	Calgary	Alberta
1975	Gallery Moos	Toronto	Ontario
1976	Owens Art Gallery; Mount Allison University	Sackville	New Brunswick
1976	Canadian Art Galleries	Calgary	Alberta
1976	Gallery Moos	Toronto	Ontario
1977	Martha Jackson Gallery	New York	New York
1977	Art Gallery of Nova Scotia	Halifax	Nova Scotia
1977	Gallery Moos	Toronto	Ontario
1978	Gallery Moos	Toronto	Ontario
1979	Thomas Gallery	Winnipeg	Manitoba
1979	Gallery Moos	Toronto	Ontario
1979	Gallery Moos	Toronto	Ontario
1980	Robertson Galleries	Ottawa	Ontario
1981	Gallery Moos	Toronto	Ontario
1982	Art Gallery of Ontario; Forty Year Retrospective	Toronto	Ontario

== Group exhibitions ==
Year	Venue	City	Prov / State
1947		Modena	Italy
1947		Paris	France
1947		Munich	Germany
1957	Isaacs Gallery	Toronto	Ontario
1957	Hayter Gallery	Toronto	Ontario
1958	Jordan Gallery	Toronto	Ontario
1959	Gallery Moos	Toronto	Ontario
1964	Winnipeg Biennial	Winnipeg	Manitoba
1965	xxvith Canadian Biennial, National Gallery of Canada	Ottawa	Ontario
1966	Winnipeg Biennial	Winnipeg	Manitoba
1967	Ontario Centennial Art Exhibition, traveling exhibition throughout Ontario organized by the Province of Ontario	Various	Ontario
1970	'Eight Artists from Canada', Tel Aviv Museum	Tel Aviv	Israel
1971	Man and His World	Montreal	Quebec
1972	xxxvi International Biennial Exhibition of Art	Venice	Italy
1972	'Toronto Painters 1953–65,'; National Gallery of Canada, Ottawa, Ontario and the Art Gallery of Ontario	Toronto	Ontario
1973	'The Canadian Canvas,' traveling exhibition organized by Time Canada	Various	Canada
1977	'Seven Canadian Painters', Canada Council Art Bank, traveling exhibition	Various	New Zealand and Australia
1978	'A Toronto Sensibility,'.The Art Gallery at Harbourfront	Toronto	Ontario
1979	'Now and Then,' Factory 77	Toronto	Ontario
1979	'Compass/8 Painters,'; The Art Gallery at Harbourfront	Toronto	Ontario
1980	'Contemporary Canadian Art,'; Nabisco World Headquarters Reception Gallery	East Hanover	New York
1980	'A Selection of Canadian Paintings,'; The Art Gallery at Harbourfront	Toronto	Ontario
1980	'The Staff Collects – An Experiment,' paintings from the Shell Collection, The Art Gallery at Harbourfront	Toronto	Ontario
1981	'Other Places, Other Painters; Canadian Contemporary Art, ' Sir George Williams Art Gallery, Concordia University	Montreal	Quebec
2007	Thielsen Gallery	London	Ontario
2010	Horton Gallery	New York	New York

== Awards ==
- Victor Martyn Lynch-Staunton Award (1974)
- Queen's Silver Jubilee Medal (1977)

== Winners of the Gershon Iskowitz Prize ==
In 2007, the Gershon Iskowitz Foundation in partnership with the Art Gallery of Ontario (AGO) established the annual Gershon Iskowitz Prize presented by AGO in order to raise awareness of the visual arts in Canada.

Year	Artist	City
2024	Rita McKeough	Calgary
2023	Allison Katz	Toronto
2022	Tim Whiten	Toronto
2021	Faye HeavyShield	Blood Reserve, Alberta
2019	Ken Lum	Vancouver
2018	Shuvinai Ashoona	Kinngait
2017	Valérie Blass	Montreal
2016	Rebecca Belmore	Montreal
2015	Sandra Meigs	Victoria
2014	Liz Magor	Vancouver
2013	Geoffrey Farmer	Vancouver
2012	Kim Adams	Toronto
2011	Michael Snow	Toronto
2010	Brian Jungen	Vancouver
2009	Shary Boyle	Toronto
2008	Françoise Sullivan	Montreal
2007	Mark Lewis	London, England
2006	Iain Baxter&	Windsor
2005	Max Dean	Toronto
2004	Rodney Graham	Vancouver
2003	Janet Cardiff and George Bures Miller	Guelph
2002	Geoffrey James	Toronto
2001	John Massey	Toronto
2000	Paterson Ewen	London
1999	Stan Douglas	Vancouver
1998	Shirley Wiitasalo	Toronto
1997	Ron Moppett	Calgary
1996	Murray Favro	London
1995	Betty Goodwin	Montreal
1994	Eric Cameron	Calgary
1993	Vera Frenkel	Toronto
1992	Irene F. Whittome	Montreal
1991	Arnaud Maggs	Toronto
1990	Jack Shadbolt	Vancouver
1989	Gathie Falk	Vancouver
1988	General Idea	Toronto and New York
1987	Louis Comtois	Montreal
1986	Denis Juneau	Montreal
