= Spadina station =

Toronto subway station

Spadina
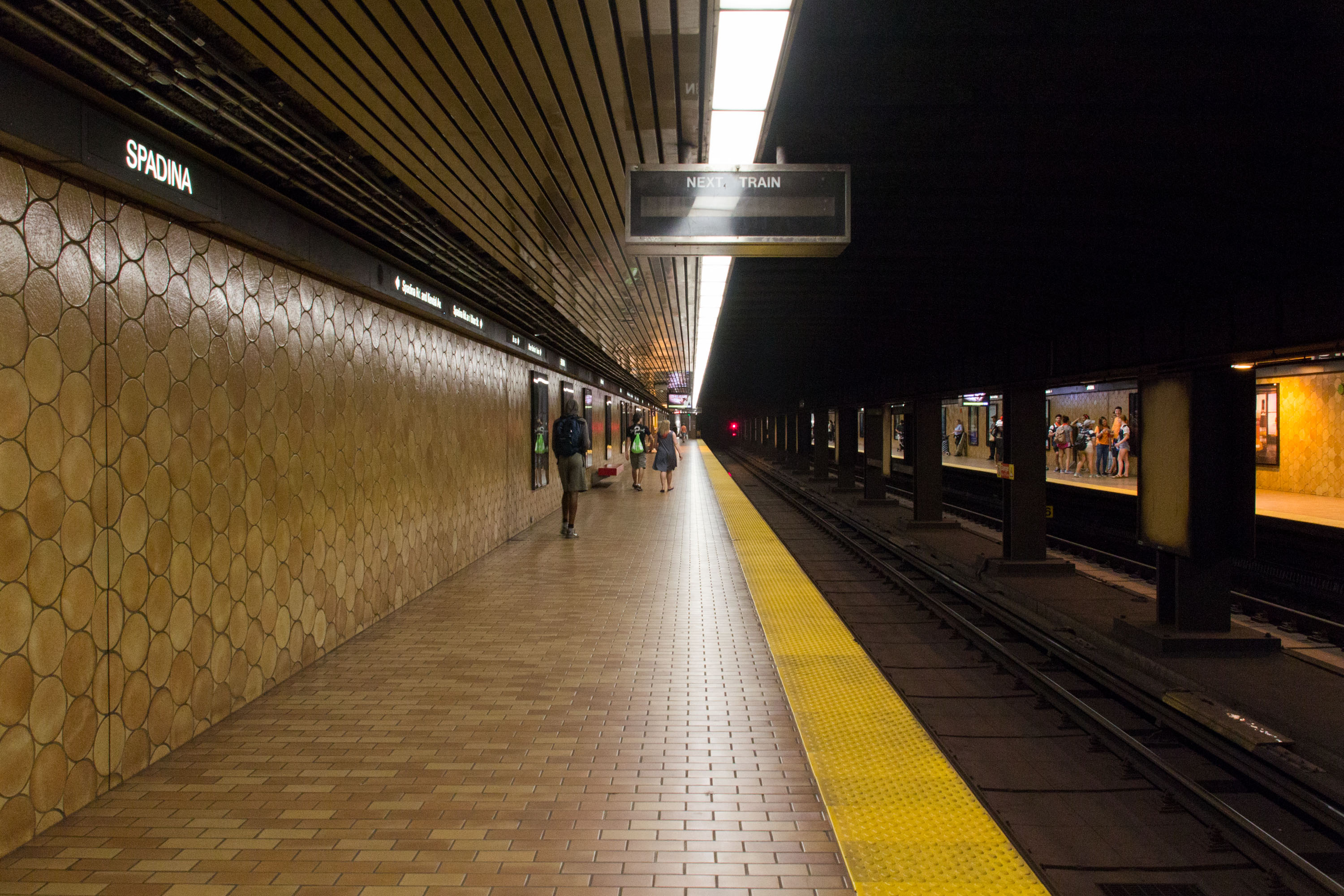
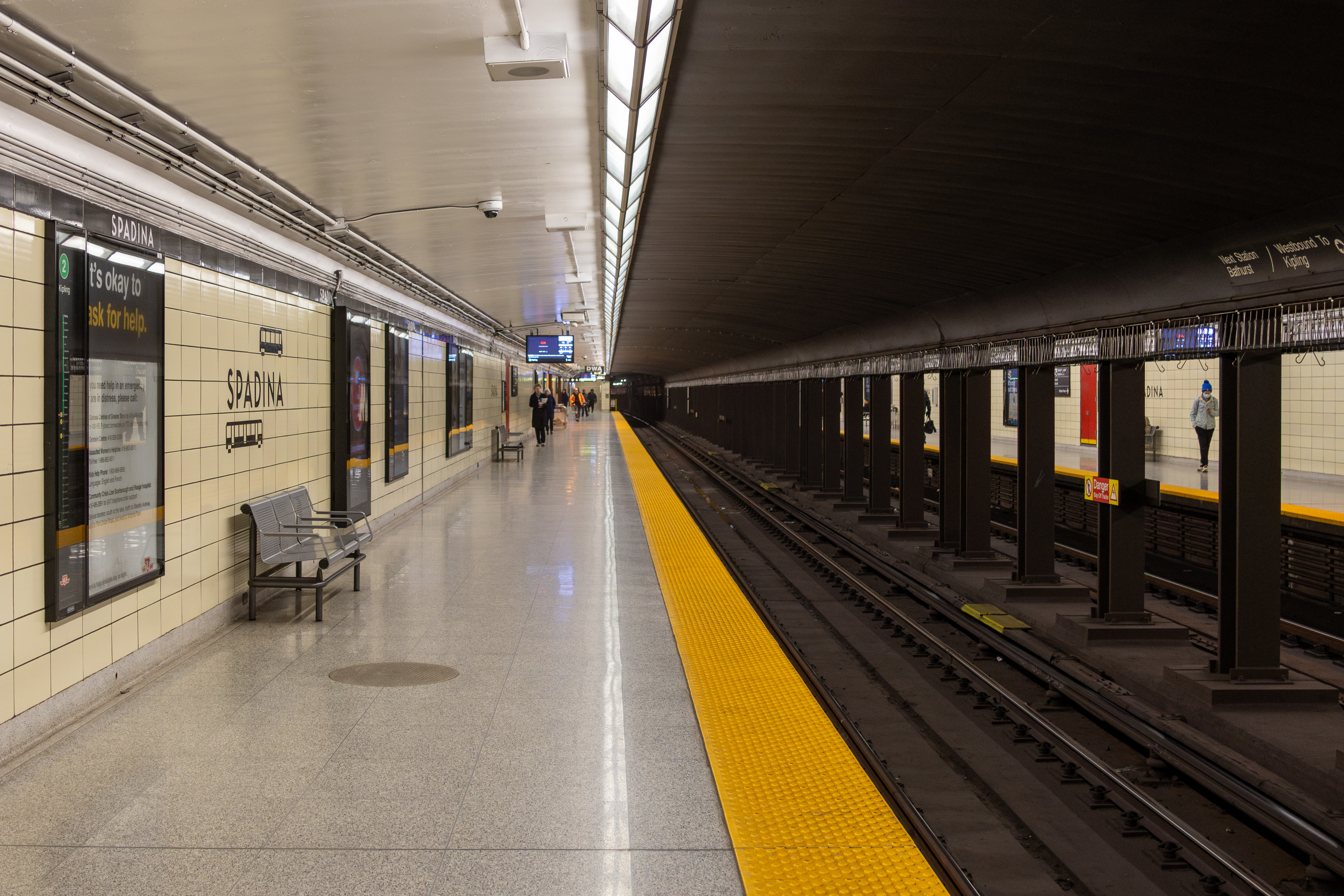
- Line 1 platform Line 2 platform

General information
- Location: 6 Spadina Road; Toronto, Ontario; Canada
- Coordinates: 43°40′07″N 79°24′17″W
- Owner: Toronto Transit Commission
- Platforms: Side platforms (Line 1 and Line 2)
- Tracks: 4 (2 per line)
- Connections: TTC buses and Streetcars: 127 Davenport; 510 Spadina; 300 Bloor–Danforth; 310 Spadina

Construction
- Structure type: Underground
- Accessible: Yes
- Architect: Adamson Associates (Line 1)

Other information
- Website: Official station page

History
- Opened: Line 2: February 26, 1966; 60 years ago; Line 1: January 28, 1978; 48 years ago; Streetcar: July 27, 1997; 29 years ago

Passengers
- 2023–2024: 11,479 (Line 1); 27,601 (Line 2); 39,080 (total)
- Rank: 11 of 70

Services
Preceding station	Toronto Transit Commission	Following station
Dupont towards Vaughan	Line 1 Yonge–University	St. George towards Finch
Bathurst towards Kipling	Line 2 Bloor–Danforth	St. George towards Kennedy
Terminus	510 Spadina	Sussex Avenue towards Union
Track layout
and mezzanine
Location

Spadina is a subway station on Line 1 Yonge–University and Line 2 Bloor–Danforth in Toronto, Ontario, Canada. It is located on Spadina Road, north of Bloor Street West. It is one of only three stations open overnight, along with Queens Quay station and Union station.

The station consists of two separate sections, one for each line, at the same level and 150 metres apart. The north–south platforms, which opened in 1978, were originally planned as a separate station, but the TTC decided to join to the existing 1966 east–west station with a pedestrian tunnel containing a pair of long moving walkways. The cost of the moving walkways themselves became an issue when they became due for refurbishment or replacement, and they were shut down and ultimately removed in 2004, leaving the corridor as a simple underground walkway. The former location of the moving walkways remains visible because the tiles used to cover their removal are noticeably different. Warnings to hold the handrails are still embossed on the walls where the ends of the moving walkways were once located.

An underground loop for the 510 Spadina streetcar was added in 1997 near the east end of the east–west platforms. The streetcar platform adds Postmodern finishes to the station's mix of styles. These range from the basic Modernist tiles of the Bloor–Danforth line platform, to the more intricate round tiles and backlit signage of the Yonge–University line platform.

In 1997, the station's Line 2 platforms and exit were made accessible. In 2026, the Line 1 platforms became accessible.

== Architecture and art ==
=== Spadina and Bloor ===
The largest above ground structure is the bus station; its main entrance, along with elevators and a fare collector booth, is located on the east side of Spadina Road just north of Bloor Street, which currently serves as the terminus of the 127 Davenport bus route. Originally, it was built to serve as a looping facility for the former 77 Spadina bus which operated until the underground streetcar loop was added and the buses were replaced by 510 Spadina streetcars. This building, with its pseudo-mansard roof and brick arches and no obvious bold signage like most other station entrances, is located at the easterly end of the Bloor line platforms. There is a secondary entrance building directly opposite, on the west side of Spadina Road, which is only accessible to those with Presto cards.

At the street level, there are three large cedar wood carvings called K'san Village House Posts depicting an owl, a wolf and a hawk. They are the work of Fedelia O'Brien, Murphy Green and Chuck Heit respectively, who are from the Gitxsan First Nation in British Columbia.

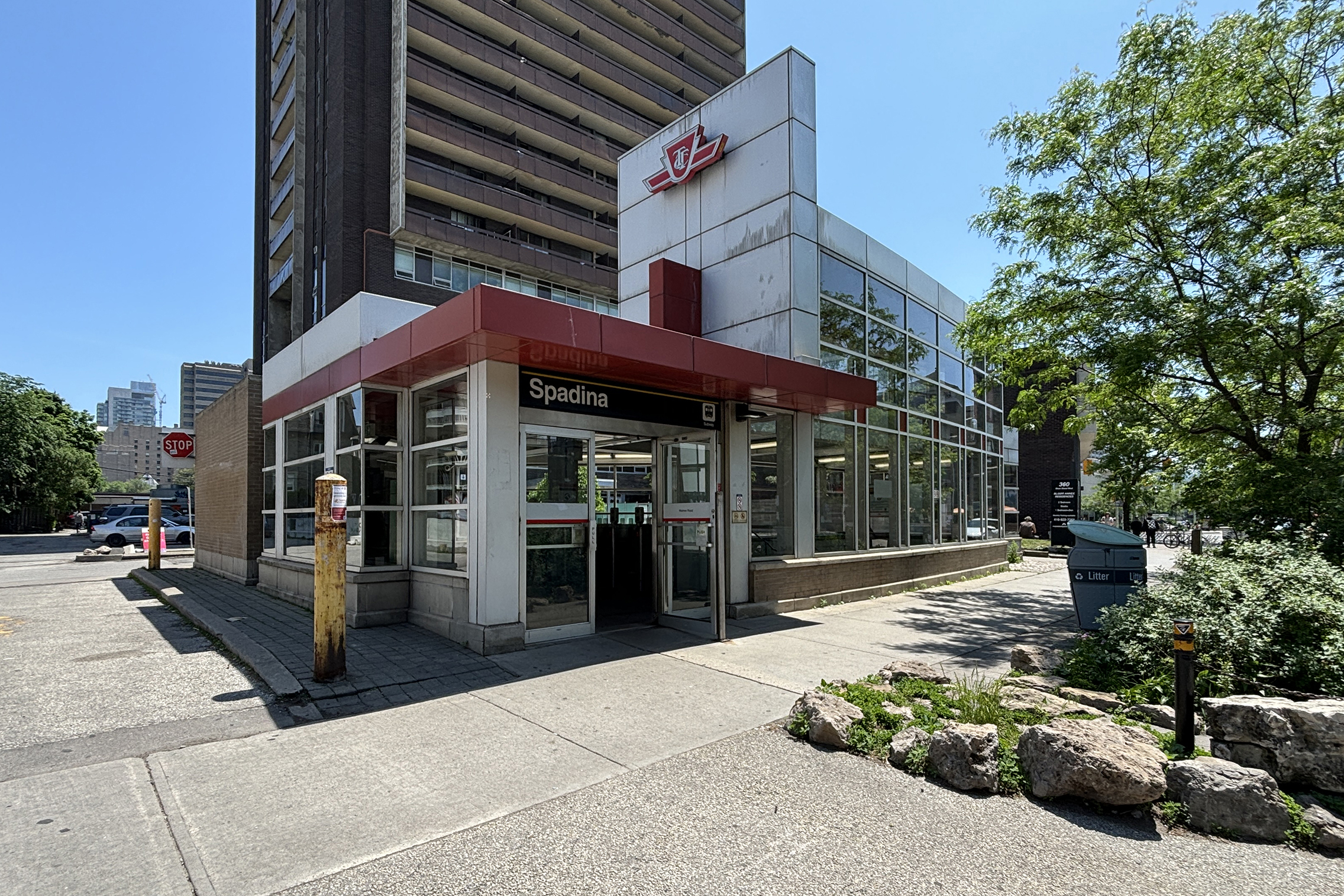
Spadina Station Walmer Road entrance

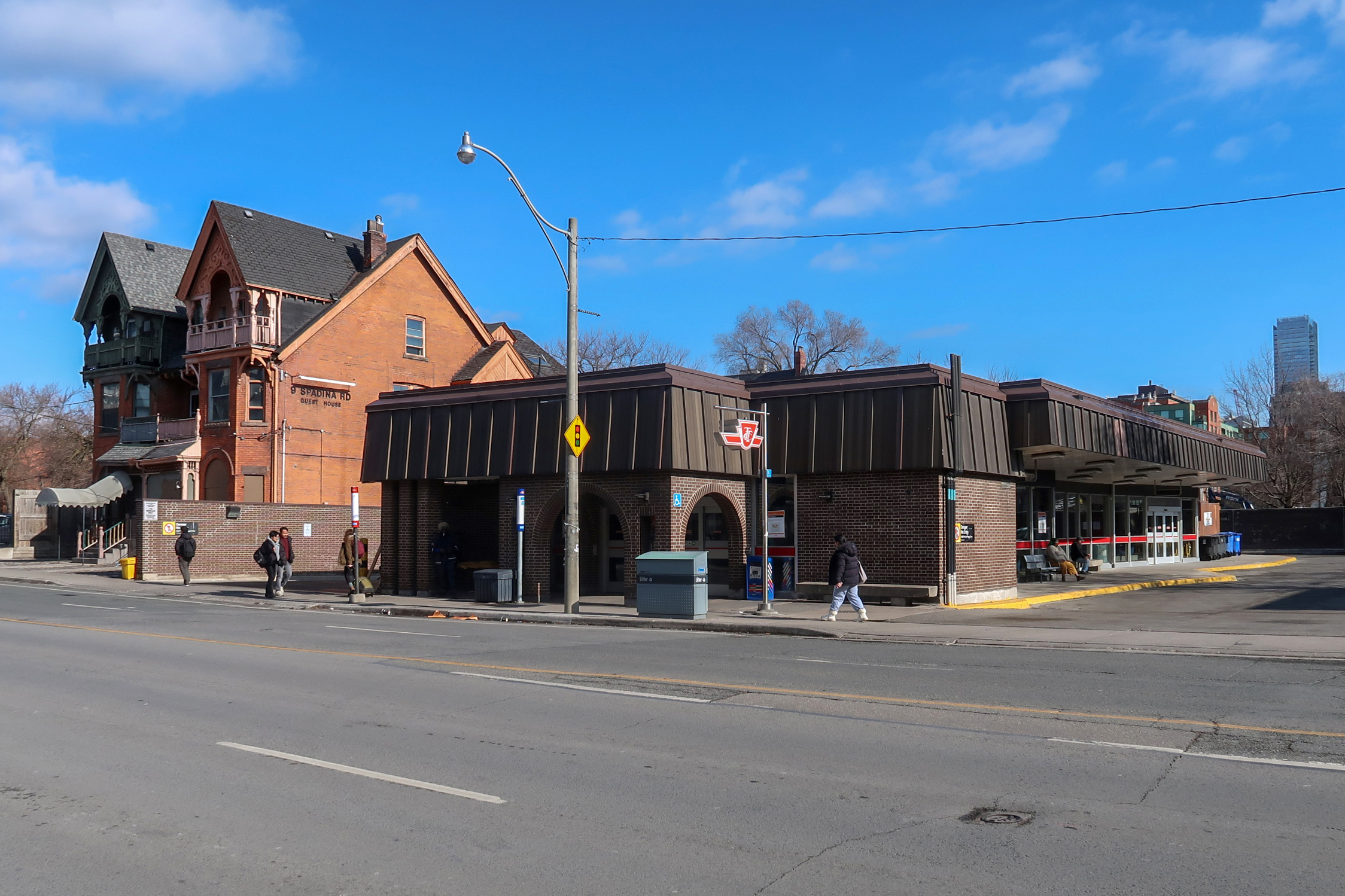
Spadina TTC Bus Terminal

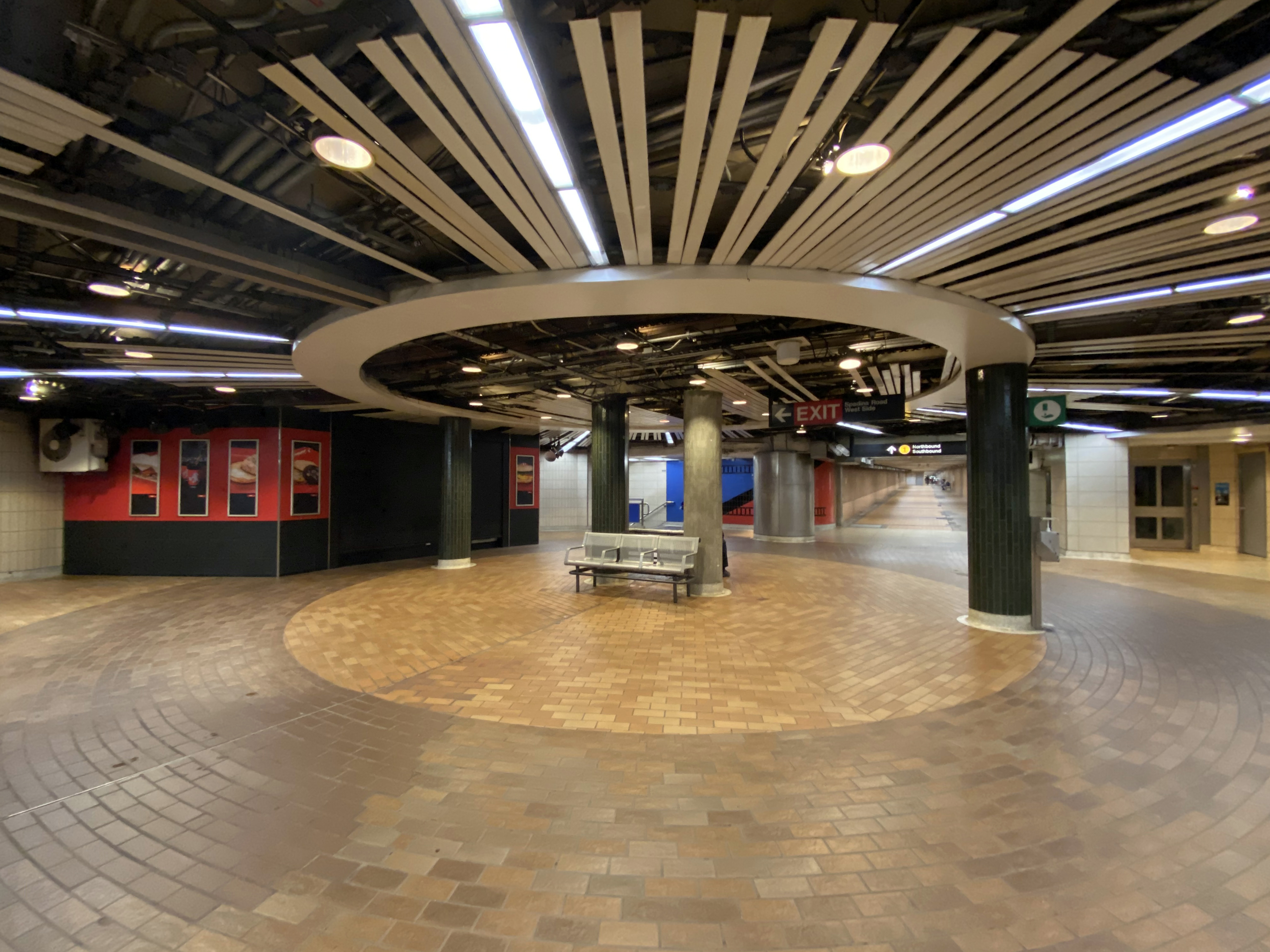
Line 2 concourse

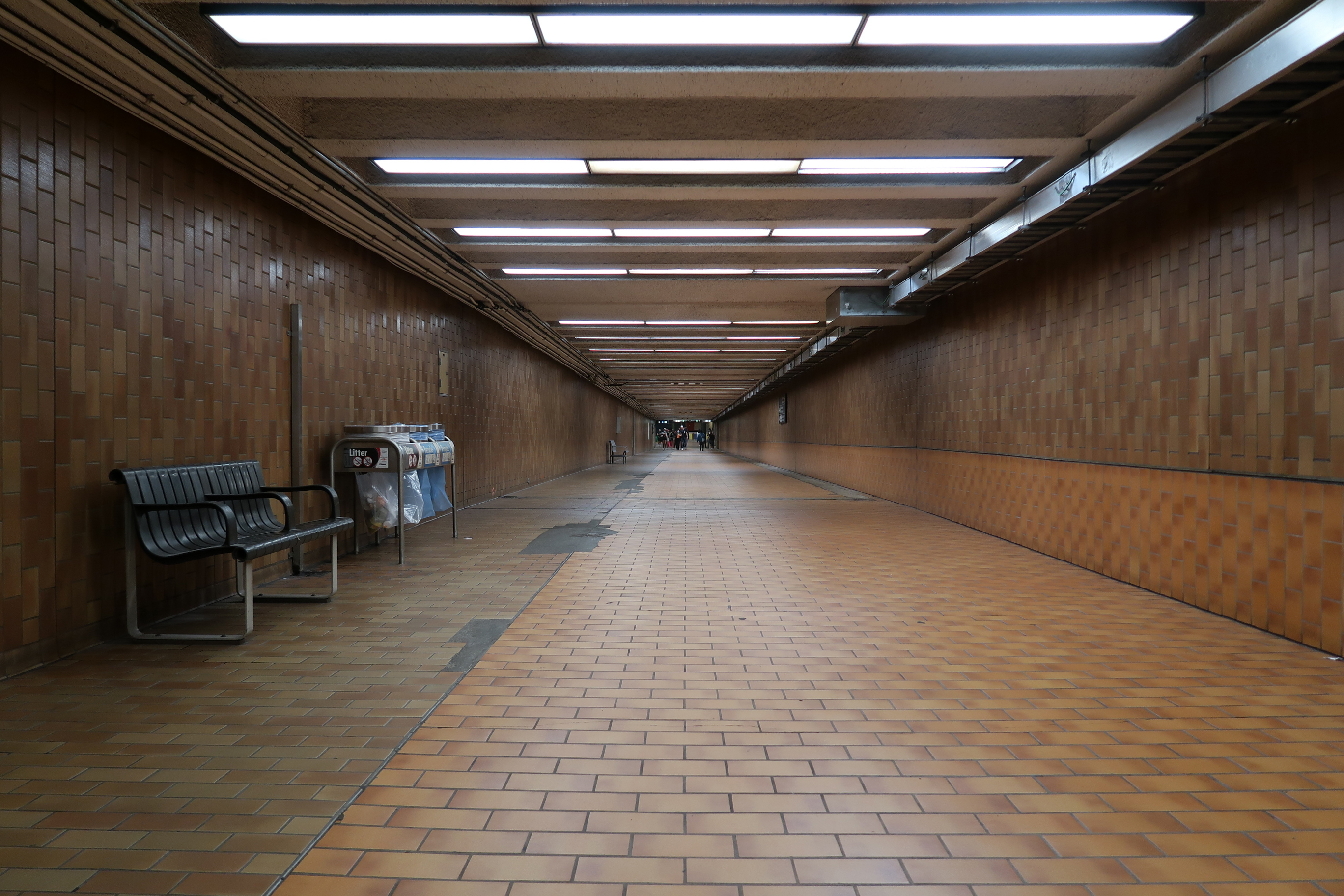
Pedestrian tunnel previously containing a pair of long moving walkways, which were removed in 2004

=== Walmer Road ===
There is an automatic entrance, accessible only to Presto card holders as of November 2017, on the east side of Walmer Road. It leads to the west end of the Bloor line platforms.

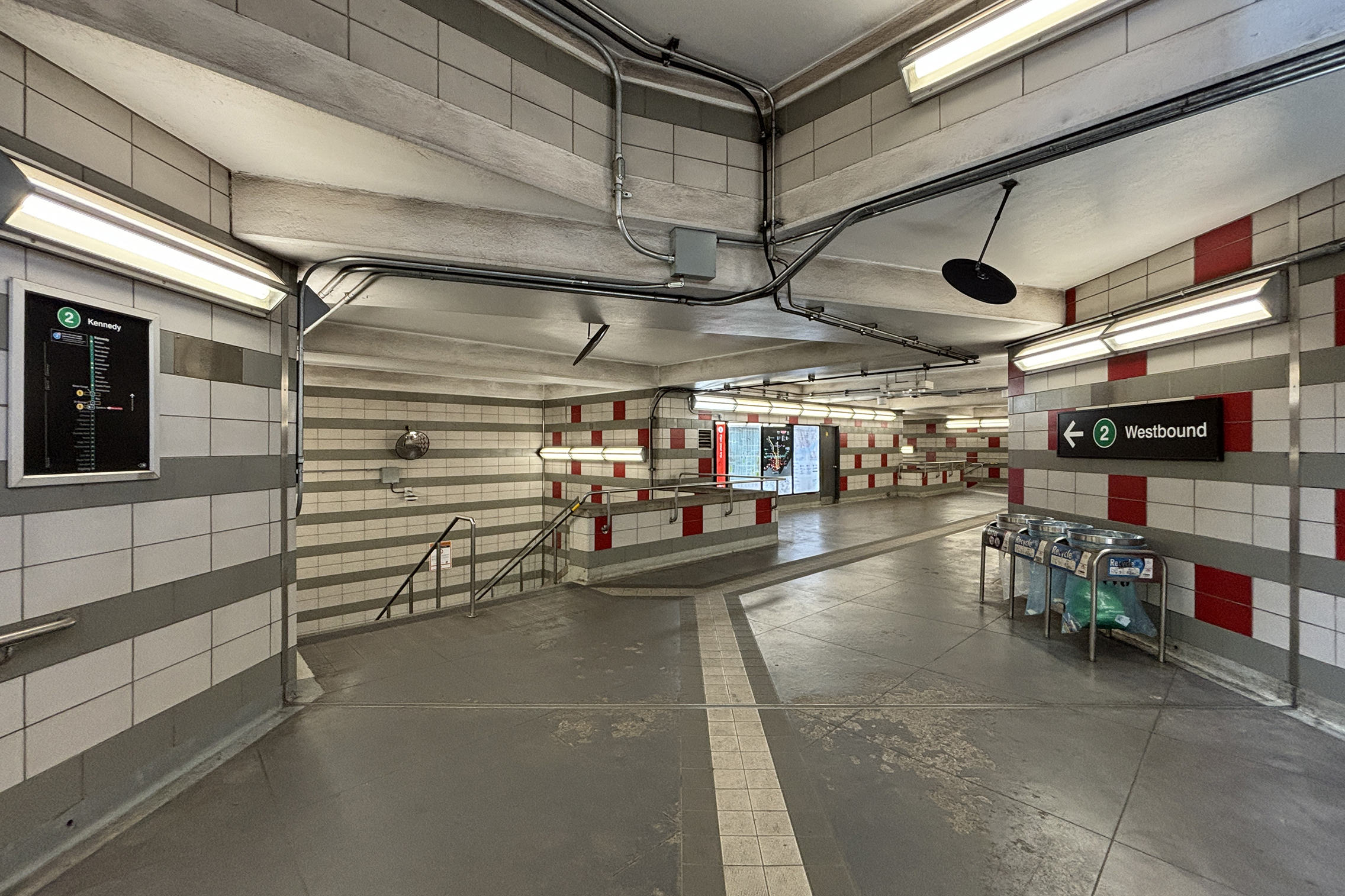
Walmer Road concourse

=== Norman B. Gash House ===
The main entrance to the Yonge–University line part of the station is concealed inside a house at 85 Spadina Road, which was built in 1899 and listed as a heritage property by the City of Toronto in 1974. The building was designed by architect Robert Ogilvie for lawyer Norman Gash. The property had previously been needed for construction of the Spadina Expressway, which was cancelled in 1971. Since it was still planned to build the subway on its original route along the course of the expressway, the site was subsequently acquired by Metropolitan Toronto in 1972, with the intention of replacing it with a new station building. Local protest forced the TTC to repurpose the old building, thereby retaining the residential character of the neighbourhood. Opposite the house, on the west side of Spadina Road at Kendal Avenue, there is an uncovered stairwell entrance to the station mezzanine. There are northbound and southbound bus stops outside the entrances. This entrance only accepts Presto cards.

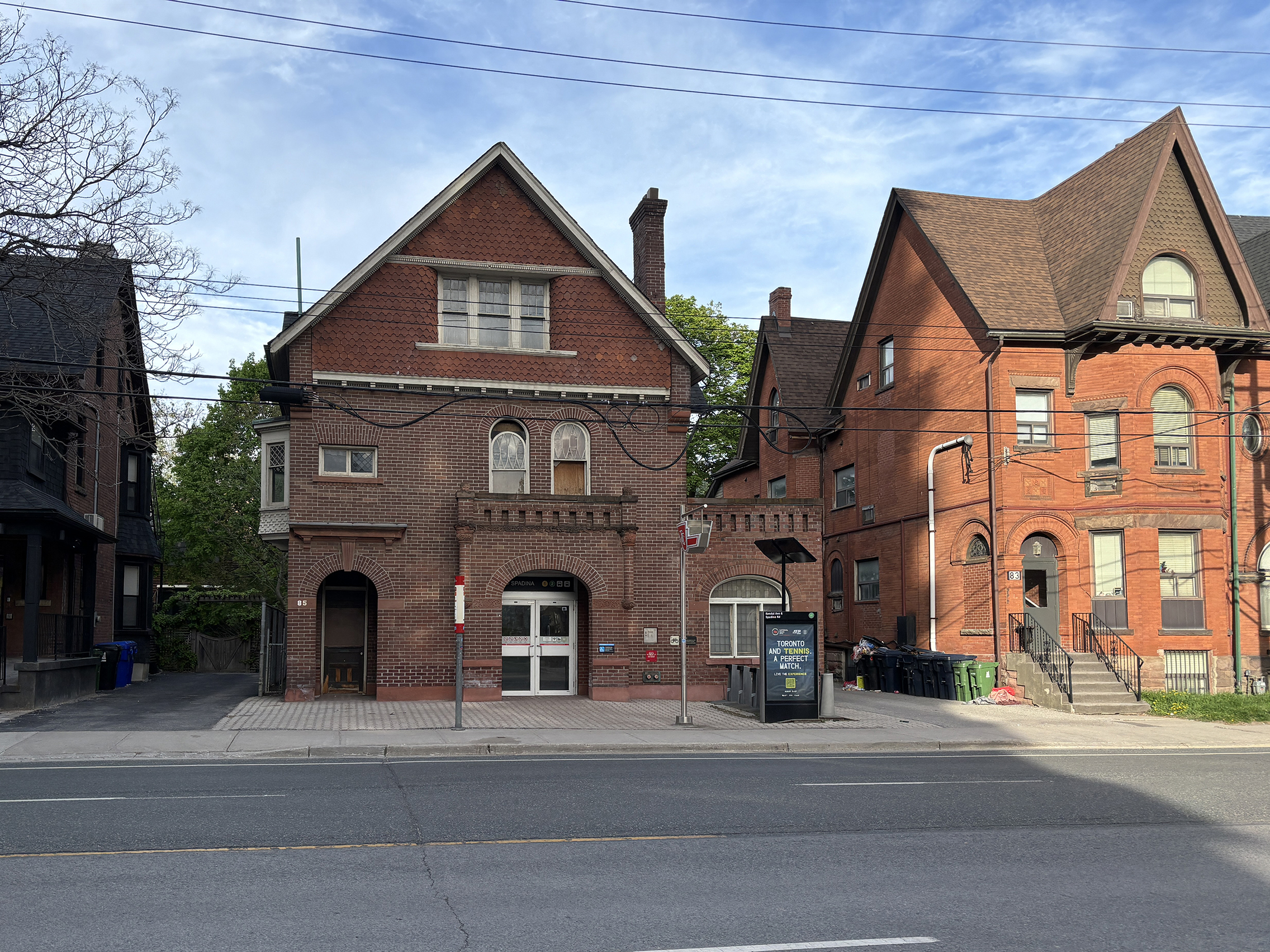
The Norman B. Gash House at 85 Spadina Road

This building includes two large artworks: Morning Glory by Louis de Niverville, a surreal enamel mural sited on the ground level by the stairwell; and Barren Ground Caribou by Joyce Wieland, a huge quilt featuring caribou in a tundra landscape, located near the unstaffed turnstile on the concourse level below. In 2025, Barren Ground Caribou was temporarily removed so it could be featured in a major retrospective of Wieland's work at the Montreal Museum of Fine Arts and the Art Gallery of Ontario. It was scheduled to be reinstalled in 2026.

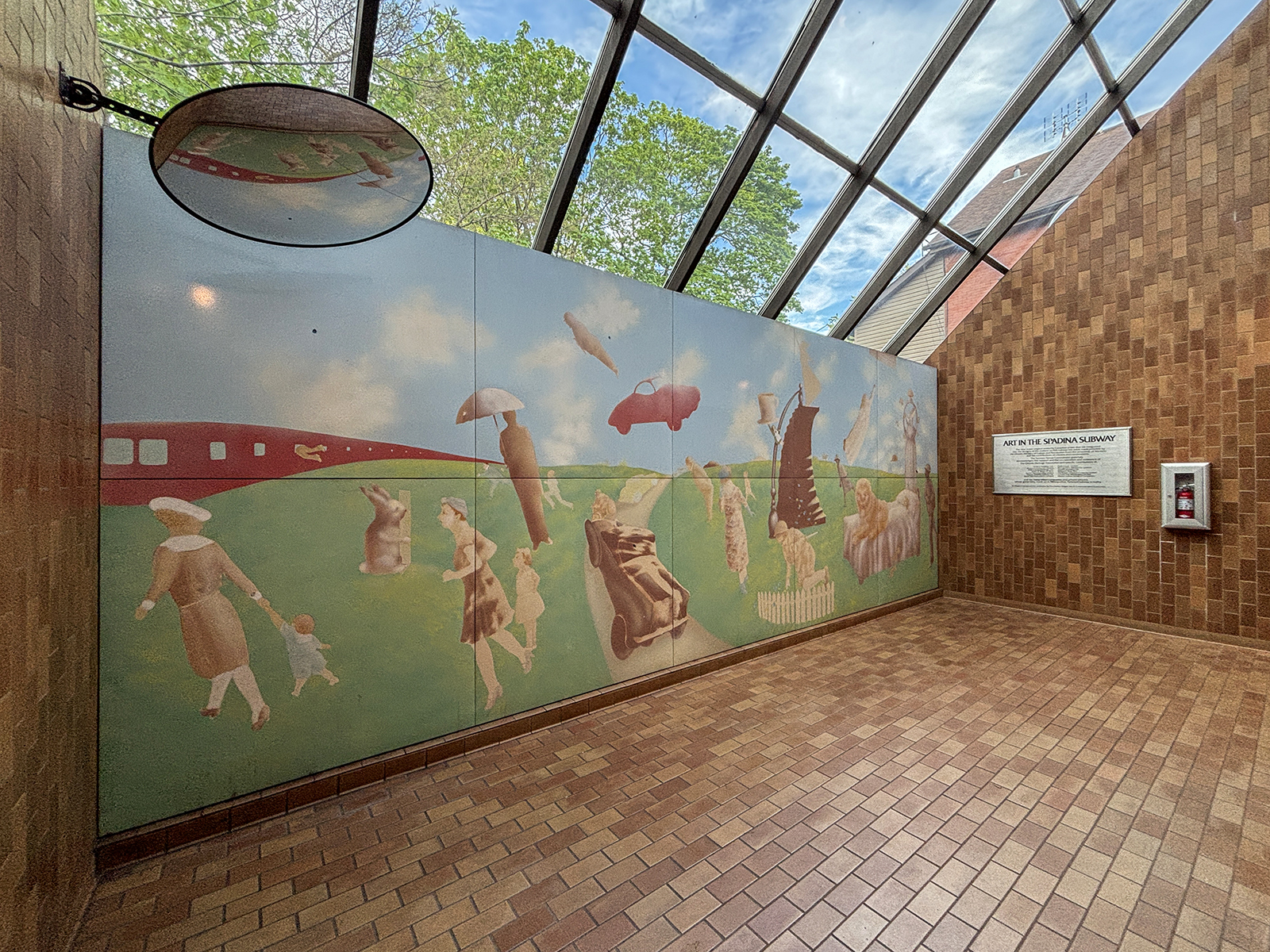
Morning Glory, Gash House entrance

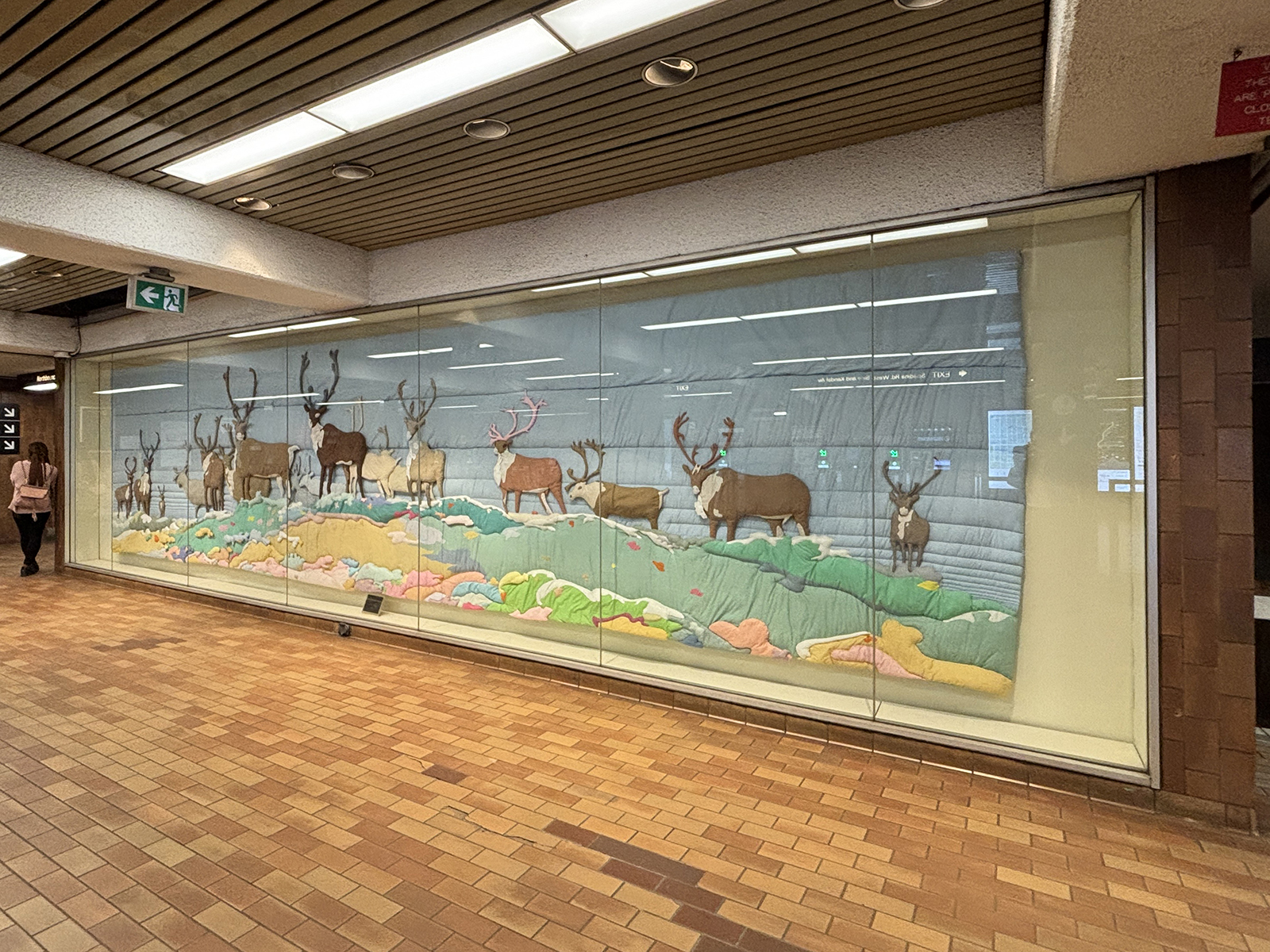
Barren Ground Caribou, Gash House entrance

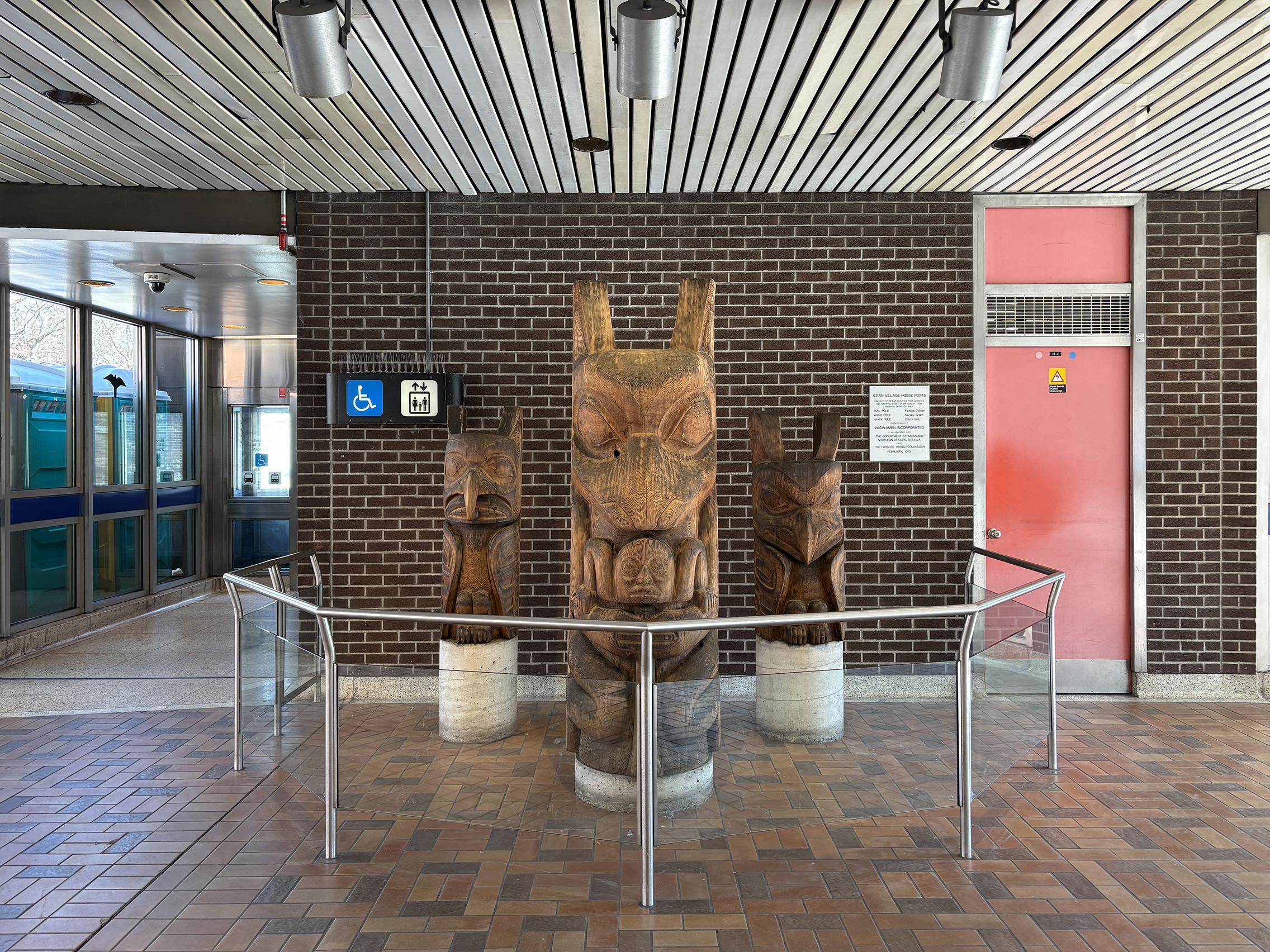
K'san Village House Posts, Spadina/Bloor entrance

== Subway infrastructure in the vicinity ==
This section of the Bloor line was constructed by cut and cover on a strip of land behind the properties fronting on the north side of Bloor Street. The tracks run east from here to the lower level of St. George station. Between the stations connecting tracks from the Bloor line rise on each side to the upper level of St. George station, like exit ramps on a highway, providing a link with the University line.

The section of the Yonge–University line at and between Dupont and Spadina stations was constructed under Spadina Road. South of the station the tunnel turns off-street and curves eastward through 90 degrees to run briefly parallel to Bloor Street before entering the upper level of St. George station.

== Station improvements ==
In 2022, the Toronto Transit Commission proposed constructing elevators for the side platforms of Spadina station on Line 1; they will connect to the street level concourse. Construction was largely completed by September 2026, rendering the Line 1 platforms accessible.

== Nearby landmarks ==
The station is located in The Annex neighbourhood at the northwest corner of the University of Toronto main campus. Destinations and nearby points of interest include the Spadina Road Branch of the Toronto Public Library, the Native Canadian Centre of Toronto, Miles Nadal Jewish Community Centre, Bloor Street United Church, and the Trinity-St. Paul's United Church.

== Surface connections ==
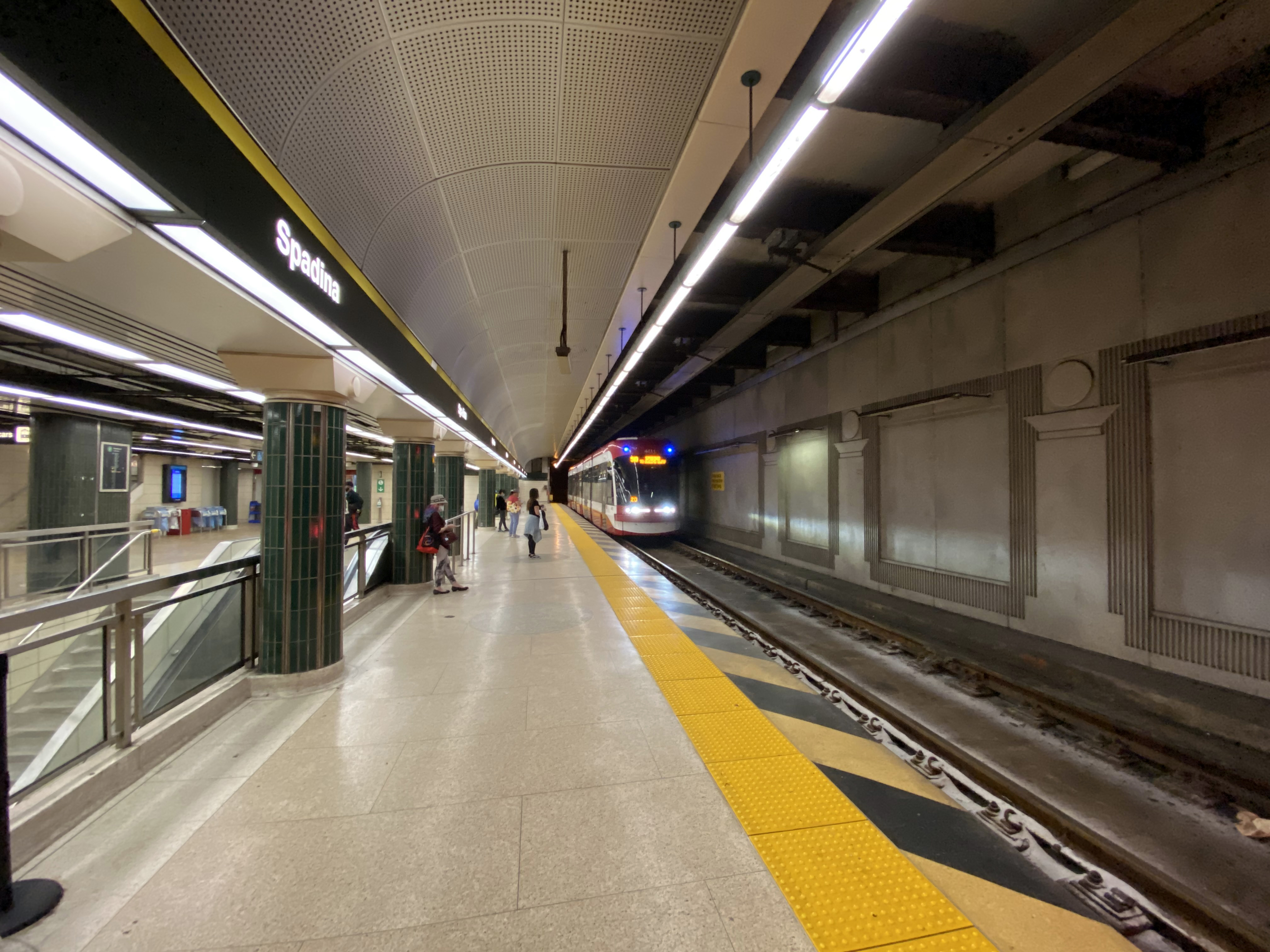
Streetcar platform

When the subway is closed, streetcars still enter the station. TTC routes serving the station include:

Route	Name	Additional information
127	Davenport	Westbound to St Clair Avenue West and Old Weston Road
300A	Bloor–Danforth	Eastbound to Warden, westbound to Pearson Airport (On-street transfer)
300B	Bloor–Danforth	Eastbound to Kennedy station, westbound to West Mall (On-street transfer)
310	Spadina	Blue Night Streetcar service; southbound to Union station via Harbourfront
510A	Spadina	Streetcar; Southbound to Union station via Harbourfront
510B	Spadina	Streetcar; southbound to Queens Quay and Spadina Avenue
510C	Spadina	Streetcar; southbound to King Street West
