= Chinati Foundation =

Art museum in Texas, United States

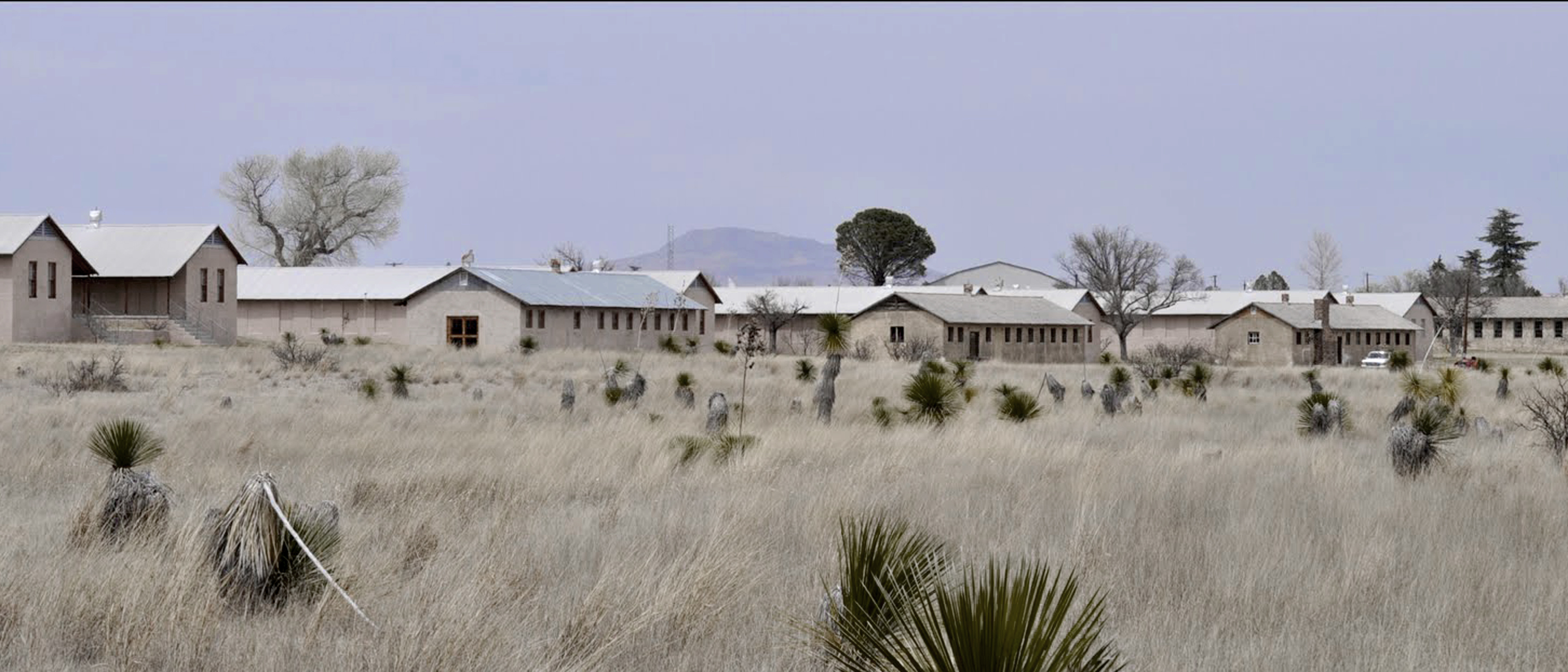

- Location of the Chinati Foundation in Texas Chinati Foundation (the United States)
- Established: 1986
- Location: 1 Cavalry Row, Marfa, Texas, United States
- Coordinates: 30.298722°N 104.027009°W
- Type: Art Museum
- Director: Caitlin Murray
- Website: chinati.org

The Chinati Foundation/La Fundación Chinati is a contemporary art museum located in Marfa, Texas, based upon the ideas of its founder, artist Donald Judd.

== Mission ==
The specific intention of Chinati is to preserve and present to the public permanent large-scale installations by a limited number of artists. The emphasis is on works in which art and the surrounding landscape are inextricably linked. As Judd wrote in the foundation's first catalogue in 1987:

It takes a great deal of time and thought to install work carefully. This should not always be thrown away. Most art is fragile and some should be placed and never moved again. Somewhere a portion of contemporary art has to exist as an example of what the art and its context were meant to be. Somewhere, just as the platinum iridium meter guarantees the tape measure, a strict measure must exist for the art of this time and place.

== History ==
The Chinati Foundation is located on 340 acres (1.4 km^{2}) of land on the site of former Fort D. A. Russell in Marfa, Texas, and in some buildings in the town's center.

Donald Judd first visited Marfa, Texas, in 1971, and moved himself from New York to Marfa as a full-time resident in 1977. Construction and installation at the site began in 1979 with initial assistance from the Dia Art Foundation in New York. The Chinati Foundation opened to the public in 1986 as an independent, non-profit, publicly funded institution.

Chinati was originally conceived to exhibit the work of Donald Judd, John Chamberlain and Dan Flavin. However, the idea of the foundation developed further and its collection was enriched over years, and now the permanent collection has expanded to include Carl Andre, Ingólfur Arnarsson, Roni Horn, Ilya Kabakov, Richard Long, Claes Oldenburg and Coosje van Bruggen, David Rabinowitch, and John Wesley. Each artist's work is installed in a separate building or outdoor area on the museum's grounds. In addition to the permanent collection, regular temporary exhibitions feature modern and contemporary art of diverse media.

It was Judd's goal at Chinati to bring art, architecture, and nature together in order to form a coherent whole.

In October 2013 the foundation finalized plans for untitled (dawn to dusk), a 930 m^{2} (10,000 sq ft), C-shaped concrete structure by Robert Irwin, to join Chinati's permanent collection. Opened in July 2016, this installation utilizes Fort D. A. Russell's ruined former hospital, rebuilding the structure within its original footprint while incorporating several architectural interventions to modify the building's dynamics of light and space.

Also in 2022, the Chinati Foundation—along with the Central Marfa Historic District in Marfa—was officially added to the National Register of Historic Places.

=== Directors ===
- 1994–2010 Marianne Stockebrand
- 2011–2012 Thomas Kellein
- 2013–2022 Jenny Moore
- 2023–Caitlin Murray

== Collection ==
Artist	Work
Carl Andre	Words, 1958–1972 Chinati Thirteener, 2010
Donald Judd	100 untitled works in mill aluminum, 1982–1986 15 untitled works in concrete, 1980–1984 The Arena, 1980–1987
Ingólfur Arnarsson	untitled works, 1991–1992
Ilya Kabakov	School No. 6, 1993
John Chamberlain	Various works, 1972–1983
Richard Long	Sea Lava Circles, 1988
Dan Flavin	untitled (Marfa project), 1996
Claes Oldenburg and Coosje van Bruggen	Monument to the Last Horse, 1991
Roni Horn	Things That Happen Again, Pair Object VII (For a Here and a There), 1986–1988
David Rabinowitch	Elliptical Plane in 3 Masses and 4 Scales III, 1971–72 6-Sided Bar III, 1969
Robert Irwin	untitled (dawn to dusk), 2016
John Wesley	Al Capone Flouting the Law, 1970 Chateau, 1983 Choir, 1988 Day Titanic, 1984 Hannah in Shades, 1989 Hunting Dogs, 1985 Jack Frost, 1971 Mattress Cloud, 1981 Panoply: Eight Silkscreens Inspired by the Splendours of the Great War, 1971 Six-Legged Sheep, 1993 Tour de France, 1982

== Community ==
The Chinati Foundation sponsors art and education programs, establishing close links to the local community and other cultural institutions and universities in the United States and abroad. Started by Judd in 1989, Chinati's Artist in Residence Program provides artists from around the world an opportunity to develop and exhibit their work in a stimulating environment. Its Internship Program offers students from a variety of disciplines hands-on museum experience. Each summer the museum hosts art classes for local students. Chinati has been producing an annual newsletter in English and Spanish since 1995 (some of the back issues are available at the Chinati bookstore and all can be downloaded at foundation's website.

== Residencies ==
- John Beech (artist) 1998

== Visiting ==
The Chinati Foundation has reopened, after being closed in response to the COVID-19 pandemic.

The closest airports to Marfa are in El Paso and Midland/Odessa. It is about a three-hour drive from either airport.
