= Mark Prent =

Canadian artist (1947-2020)

- Born: 1947; Łódź, Poland
- Died: September 2, 2020 (aged 72–73); St. Albans, Vermont
- Education: Sir George Williams University
- Known for: Sculpture, performance art
- Awards: Victor Martyn Lynch-Staunton Award 1977; Guggenheim Foundation Fellowship 1977
- Elected: Royal Canadian Academy of Arts

Mark Prent RCA (born Poland, 1947, died USA, 2020) was a Canadian sculptor and performance artist who lived in the United States and was best known for the graphic realism of his figurative sculpture. Prent's sculptures have been described as disturbing and even brutal. His work was the subject of a 1972 lawsuit in which a gallery, exhibiting one of his works consisting of a butcher’s counter of human body parts, was charged with "exhibiting a disgusting object". Prent was the subject of the 1976 documentary "If Brains Were Dynamite [You Wouldn't Have Enough to Blow Your Nose] - Mark Prent".

== Style and technique ==
Mark Prent works consist of life-moulded mixed media, polyester resin and fiberglass casts of human models in sometimes disturbing poses and juxtapositions. Mark Prent has consistently maintained throughout the years, that his sculptures and installations do not carry intentional messages. Despite the powerfully grotesque imagery that he has employed, interpretation is left to the viewer. Prent developed his own unique technique of layering to give a heightened realism to his figures; thus giving rise to the label "Extended Realism". When he later became concerned about the toxicity of polyester resin, he began to experiment with other materials, developing innovative techniques for recreating that trademark quality of virulent realism. This venture into new materials led him in many new directions in his own work and ultimately, to become a technical resource for other artists as well.

== Biography ==
Born in Łódź, Poland in 1947, Prent moved with his family to Canada in infancy, and grew up in Montreal. He was educated at Sir George Williams University in Montreal, earning a Bachelor of Fine Arts degree. In 1983 he relocated with his wife to Vermont (U.S.A.). Since his public career began in 1970, Mark Prent has had over forty solo exhibitions, including the Stedelijk Museum in Amsterdam, the Academy of Arts in Berlin and the Musée d'art contemporain de Montréal, as well as participating in an extensive list of group exhibitions. His work can be found in the collections of the National Gallery of Canada, the Art Gallery of Ontario and Montreal's Musée d’art contemporain. He has been the recipient of numerous awards including many Canada Council Senior Arts Grants, the Guggenheim Foundation Fellowship, the Canada Council’s Victor Martyn Lynch-Staunton Award (1977), the Ludwig Vogelstein Foundation Fellowship, and an Art Matters grant. He was made a member of the Royal Canadian Academy of Arts.

Prent had a 43-year career at Concordia University in Montreal as a Senior Technician in the Mould-Making workshop in the Department of Studio Arts. He was well-known for his technical mastery, and his devotion to helping students realize their artistic projects.

== Career ==
=== Early controversial work ===
In that same year as he graduated, Prent exhibited two uniquely disturbing entries in "Survey '70", an exhibit of Canadian avant garde artists organized by the Montreal Museum of Fine Arts. In 1972 his work gained notoriety when he had solo exhibitions at the Isaacs Gallery on Yonge St. in Toronto. Responding to a complaint lodged by a public morality organization, the Toronto police attempted to close the exhibition which included a delicatessen, dinner table, and butcher room featuring human body parts as foodstuffs. A large group of artists, critics and gallery owners came together to fund the successful legal battle in defense of the Isaacs Gallery. This confrontation was repeated in 1974 when Mark Prent's second solo exhibition at the Isaacs Gallery featured controversial room environments including an interactive prison electrocution scene, a voyeuristic glimpse into a handicapped toilet, and an enigmatic operation in progress on a figure with the head of pig and the body of a woman. The gallery's right to exhibit these works was again successfully defended in court.

=== Berlin ===
In 1974, Mark Prent's friend, installation artist Edward Kienholz, secured Prent an invitation to live and work in Berlin, Germany via the German Academic Exchange Service. Prent and his wife Sue spent nearly two years living and working in Berlin, a period of prolific work for the artist which produced a series of figurative installation sculptures of depicting mythic ordeals, superhuman athletes, and the merciless warriors. Upon his return to Canada in 1976, Prent embarked on a new series of smaller, more personal sculptures as well as working on his large installation works.

=== In the U.S. ===
By 1983 Prent moved to a larger studio space in Vermont (U.S.A.). In 1992 he and his wife began a life-molding and casting business in Vermont called "Pink House Studios Inc.", producing a series of technical/educational videos on life-molding and casting topics, and developing a line of unique products which are sold to mold-makers around the world.

His visceral creations earned respect from kindred spirits in the film world. He had a joint exhibition with Canadian horror film icon David Cronenberg, titled Crimes Against Nature, at Toronto’s The Power Plant in 1987.

=== Recent works ===
In 2005, Prent began a new series of video-taped performance pieces in collaboration with videographer/son Jesse Real Prent. In this series, Prent's own body becomes a living, interacting component of his nightmarish scenarios.

David Cronenberg selected a Prent print for a 2013 exhibition he curated at Toronto's Museum of Contemporary Canadian Art. Film director Guillermo del Toro bought one of Prent’s sculptures, The End Steals In, after coming across his work online. The piece was included in The Shape of Water director's touring exhibition At Home With Monsters, which came to the Art Gallery of Ontario in 2017. In 2018, Gallery Gevik held his first solo show since the 1990s in Toronto. In fall 2019, Prent's art was featured alongside that of Switzerland's H.R. Giger in a joint exhibition at New York's Gagosian Gallery Park & 75, curated by artist and filmmaker Harmony Korine and at the Mitchell Algus Gallery in New York.

=== Death ===
Mark Prent died of an aortic aneurysm at a Vermont hospital on September 2, 2020. He was 72.
