= Shirley Wiitasalo =

Canadian painter (born 1949)

- Born: 1949 (age 76–77); Toronto, Ontario, Canada
- Known for: painter
- Movement: Abstraction
- Awards: Governor General's Awards in Visual and Media Arts (2011), The Gershon Iskowitz Prize (1998)

Shirley Wiitasalo (born 1949) is a Canadian painter whose work is characterized by abstract shapes and lines based on urban environments. In 2011 she won the Governor General's Awards in Visual and Media Arts.

== Life and work ==
Wiitasalo was born in 1949 in Toronto where she continues to live and work. From 1967–1968, she studied at the Ontario College of Art with François Thépot. From 1974 to 1991 she was represented by the former Carmen Lamanna Gallery. From 1993 on, Wiitasalo was represented by Susan Hobbs Gallery in Toronto.

In 1986, she received the Victor Martyn Lynch-Staunton Award from the Canada Council. In 1998, Wiitasalo won The Gershon Iskowitz Prize a $50,000 cash prize and a solo exhibition at the Art Gallery of Ontario.

According to a nomination statement given by artist, Ian Carr-Harris at the Governor General's Award in Visual and Media Arts, Wiitasalo has over the course of her 30-year long career 'both inherited and shifted the practice of painting'. Her work has been described as "lush washes of colour and pattern and ethereal swipes of obscuring neutrals".

Wiitasalo has used photographic emulsions in her work, her 1981 painting Interior was created on a stretched canvas painted with Liquid Light, an image was projected onto it and finished with Bellini oils.

== Major exhibitions ==
Wiitasalo has exhibited widely across Canada in museums, artist-run centres, and commercial galleries. Notably, in 2000 she had a solo exhibition at The Power Plant and was included in the exhibition Some Canadian Women Artists organized by the National Gallery of Canada, Ottawa. Internationally she has participated in exhibitions at Kunsthalle Bern, Switzerland (1993); Galerie Paul Andriesse, Amsterdam, the Netherlands (1993); GreeneNaftali, New York (1999); in 1981 the National Gallery of Canada organized the exhibition titled, 20th Century Canadian Painting, which travelled to The National Museum of Art, Tokyo, Hokkaido Museum of Modern Art, Sapporo, Japan, and Oita Perfectural Art Centre, Oita City, Kyusha, Japan.
