= Sandra Meigs =

Canadian visual artist (born 1953)

- Born: 1953 (age 72–73); Baltimore, Maryland, U.S.
- Known for: Painter
- Awards: Governor General's Award in Visual and Media Arts, Gershon Iskowitz Prize
- Website: www.sandrameigs.com

Sandra Meigs RCA FRSC (born 1953) is a Canadian visual artist. She lives in British Columbia, Canada. Her paintings have been exhibited in Canada and internationally and she is a member of the Royal Canadian Academy of Arts.

== Biography ==
Sandra Meigs was born in Baltimore, Maryland in 1953. She was a ceramics major at the Rhode Island School of Design from 1971 to 1973 and obtained her Bachelor of Fine Arts at the Nova Scotia College of Art and Design, in Halifax in 1975. She completed her Master of Arts in Philosophy at Dalhousie University in 1980. She began her career as a painter in Toronto, and in 1993 moved to Victoria, British Columbia where she was a Professor in Visual Arts at the University of Victoria for 24 years. She retired in July 2017 after 24 years with their Visual Arts Department. She taught painting 101, as well as theory to all levels of students, both graduate and undergraduate.

Meigs' paintings have been widely exhibited in Canada and internationally. She is a member of the Royal Canadian Academy of Arts.

== Art practice ==
Meigs is known for her vivid, enigmatic paintings that combine dense narratives with comic elements. Her paintings are often provocative, providing layers of meaning that are gradually revealed. Her work typically explores psychological spaces and philosophical ideas, and, as John Bentley Mays notes in a National Post article, "[Meigs'] topics are those of the cave-painters of the Stone Age and artists ever since: the body, light and darkness, storytelling." Her works usually contain an element of paradox that encourages viewers to look for multiple meanings. As David Jager writes in NOW Magazine, "Meigs' textured surfaces and silhouette shapes seem casually naive at first glance, but they are actually carefully planned. Layering the canvas with gesso, she produces smooth raised lines and surfaces whose negative spaces hold as many surprises as her blobby and colourful shapes." Meigs works in various media and often experiments with new techniques and unusual combinations of materials. Her 2010 body of work entitled The Fold Heads, for example, straddles the line between painting and sculpture.

== Teaching experience ==
During her Master of Philosophy studies, Meigs worked as a teaching assistant at Dalhousie from 1977 to 1979. From 1983 onwards she taught art techniques in Banff; she was the Chief Administrative Assistant to the head of the Visual Art Department at the Banff School of Fine Arts. From 1984 to 1985 she worked as an art instructor at York University. She eventually moved on to be a guest Thesis Counsellor in the Graduate Division of York University.

She taught introduction to painting at the University of Toronto between 1990 and 1993 and then moved on to work at the University of Victoria. She became an associate professor teaching in their department of Visual Arts. She eventually retired in 2017 after 24 years of teaching. Her teaching practise focused on a hands-on learning rather than straight theory.

== Selected works ==
- Room of 1000 Paintings, (1986);- This work was displayed at the Toronto Pearson International Airport and consisted of a room of paintings in plain colours. It depicted various faces with different expressions.
- Love Muscle, (1989);- When displayed at the National Gallery of Canada, the titles of each work consisted of one word from the sentence: When she whispered penetrate his rocket blasted into her yearning flower.
- Baby, (1994);- Consisting of 12 paintings of oil on linen, sandblasted cedar, plywood frames and title plaques, these 12 panels in the style of children's nursery rhymes tell the story of a woman who drops her baby in a canyon.
- Canadian, (1995);- This series of 15 abstract landscape paintings use oil on linen, text panels and frames. They were displayed at the Art Gallery of Ontario and based on children's books and fairy tales.
- Reckless Days, (1997);- These 8 works were installed in a row at the Agnes Etherington Art Centre, Kingston. They use oil on panel, electric lights, silver Mylar and title plaques. Each painting was labelled as a time of day but were not installed in chronological order.
- Resin Heads, (1988);- These 25 paintings were constructed with fiberglass, resin, ethafoam, marine paint and floor vinyl to resemble human faces. They were installed alongside two circular floor displays, one alternating the words RESIN and HEADS while the other alternated the words SAVE and FACE. The Resin Heads were displayed at the Susan Hobbs Gallery. Blake Gopnik, a visual art critic wrote in the Globe and Mail that this exhibition gives "us a study in emotional minimalism." Then elaborates that this minimalism and the "unreadable expressions [of her heads] would be enough to get us pondering its wearer's feelings but assembled in a gathering brought together like a tribe that actively excludes us – the effect becomes more sinister."
- The Newborn, (2001);- These 12 paintings were installed at the Art Gallery of Greater Victoria. Meigs conceived the idea for her work while in Cougar Annie's Garden. This display uses a fairy tale style of narrative.
- Fold Heads, (2009);- Eight paintings which used acrylic, mixed media and gobo lights on irregularly shaped canvases with various fabric pieces draping off them and were accompanied with neon lights that read: "the FOLD HEADS EVER SO GOTTA GO HEY TO PLEASURE'S MINE FEELIN' FINE LUV YA SO FEELIN'LO with MISTER WHISTLER." These paintings were displayed at the Susan Hobbs Gallery. Gary Michael-Dault who writes a weekly column in the Globe and Mail about Art Galleries says that this exhibit "asks us to be infants again – but only in that initial pareidolian way. She provides us with barely enough anatomical help and then dances away."
- The Basement Panoramas, (2013);- This work consists of four panorama paintings that use acrylic on canvas to depict personal events from Meigs' life.
- Room for Mystics, (2017);- Meigs created this work in collaboration with Christopher Butterfield. It consists of 30 paintings, wall banners and various sound equipment with some paintings displayed in the center of the room on easels, while others were hung on the walls. This was the display that Meigs created after winning the Gershon Iskowitz prize.
- TERRE VERTE, (2019);- This series of paintings reflects upon the ecology and spirit of the grasslands of Southern Alberta. Meigs painted and studied these landscapes en plein air, over a period of twenty-eight years. Each of the works portrays an encounter with the synergist system of life in this diverse habitat. The works were shown as a solo exhibition at the Southern Alberta Art Gallery.

Returning to visit the same terrain, Meigs' gouache studies and acrylic paintings refer to McIntyre Ranch: a 55,000 acre ranch established in 1898 and in operation today. Meigs was included in two iterations of the McIntyre Ranch Project in 1991 and 2004, wherein the Thrall family hosted a research project between the artists, curators and biologists at the ranch. Each residency resulted in an exhibition of new works at the Southern Alberta Art Gallery in 1992 and 2005 respectively. Meigs continued her research there from 2017 through 2019, creating representations of the distinctive rough fescue, flora, wildlife and fowl of the region, rendered in her enigmatic and vivid style. Meigs depicts the landscape as alive, using neon colours and the symbol of the vortex to contend with mortality.

Meigs describes her experience in residencies in Southern Alberta and its impact upon her work as follows:

"One day I was observing a far-off eagle nest with my binoculars. The nest was on the side of the cliff, built into the clinging remnant of a tree that had tried to grow there. During this drawing session the sky darkened and it became very windy. A rainstorm began. Under my rain jacket I watched the eagle and her chicks, the mother gliding high in the dark sky, swooping low and hunting prey for her babies, then dropping the food in the nest. It was one of the most profound experiences I remember ever having in nature."

For her exhibition Sandra Meigs: Divine Rage in 2023 at the McMichael Canadian Art Collection, she was inspired by Ontario's landscape, particularly the woods in Algonquin Park and Lake Calabogie.

Meigs wrote a book of poems that was published in 1983. Many of her visual works include poetry as a supplementary part of the exhibition – but she also publishes her poetry as stand-alone material. Her book of poems, Heavens to Betsy was initially part of her installation at the Art Gallery of Lethbridge but was later published as a separate work.

== Awards ==
In 2015, she was awarded the Gershon Iskowitz Prize which came with a $50,000 cash prize. Additionally, another $10,000 was rewarded to Meigs to continue her publication. Winning the Gershon Iskowitz prize entitles the recipient to a solo show at the Art Gallery of Ontario the next year. However, her display Room for Mystics was unveiled in 2017 instead of 2016 due to the sheer volume of work she had to complete. She was unable to assemble her 30 paintings in time for 2016.

In 2015, she was one of eight recipients of the Governor General's Award in Visual and Media Arts. Winning this award came with the honour of having her work featured in the National Gallery of Canada.

Meigs has also been named a fellow at the Royal Society of Canada. She was also named a Canadian Council Laureate, having a film made in honour of her win.
