= Louis de Niverville =

Canadian modernist painter (1933–2019)

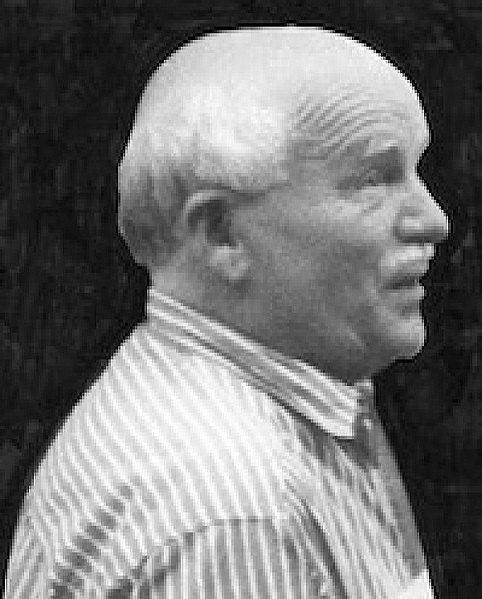
- Born: Louis de Niverville; June 7, 1933; Andover, England
- Died: February 11, 2019 (aged 85); Oakville, Ontario, Canada
- Education: self-taught
- Known for: painter, muralist, draftsman, book-illustrator
- Partner: Thomas Miller
- Awards: Canada Council senior grants; Victor Martyn Lynch-Staunton Award (1982), Canada Council

Louis de Niverville RCA (June 7, 1933 – February 11, 2019) was a Canadian modernist painter whose work has a quality of imaginative fantasy, sometimes mislabelled as surreal. He drew on memories, dreams and observations, pulling out of himself the feelings and imagery which moved and excited him and channeling them into his multi-facetted body of work. He particularly enjoyed commissions and delighted in rising to such occasions, whether they be paintings, book illustrations or murals.

== Biography ==
Louis de Niverville was born in England but his Canadian parents, Éméla Noël and Albert de Niverville, brought him to Canada when he was a one-year-old to live in Montreal. Over time, there were 13 children in the family: he was the ninth. When he was six years old, he was hospitalized for over four years (1939–1944) due to spinal tuberculosis. He attributed much of the fantasy of his later work to his habit of fantasizing during this period of his life. In 1953, the family moved to Ottawa where, in 1957, de Niverville worked as an office clerk for the Federal Department of Transport.

He has written that he was introduced to visual art by the witty illustrations in Saul Steinberg's book All in Line (1945). While in high school in Ottawa, de Niverville made posters for the Ottawa Little Theatre Company, for which he also designed and painted a stage set. His drawings came to the attention of freelance art director Paul Arthur who encouraged him to go to Toronto and show his work to Dave Mackay, art director in the graphics department at the Canadian Broadcasting Company (CBC) who immediately offered him a job. In 1957, de Niverville moved to Toronto and found work as a freelance illustrator for Mayfair magazine, then for the next 6 years worked at CBC in the graphics department with Graham Coughtry and Dennis Burton under the direction of Mackay. His real start as an artist came in 1967 when he did a mural for Expo theatre in Montreal, he believed.

He lived in Toronto from 1957 to 1987, when he moved to Mount Albert, Ontario where he created the a landscape mural titled The Maple Tree for Cineplex Odeon and also several large collages which were also pure landscape, a new development in his career. He then moved to Vancouver in 1988 where he continued to create vista works. He lived in the West until 2005 when he moved back to Ontario, to Oakville.

De Niverville met his partner, Tom Miller, at a party in 1981; they were in a relationship for 37 years, until de Niverville's death.

In autumn 2018, de Niverville was diagnosed with Stage 4 lung cancer. He died at his home in Oakville on February 11, 2019, from cancer.

== Work ==
Critics often described his work as surreal and de Niverville's work often featured surreal "inside-outside" spaces but the result was unique. His tone varied from the witty to the acerbic, and he addressed subjects as varied as recollections, observations or dreams, and even embellishments on a given word, such as the two monumental paintings titled Le Roi S'Amuse (1980), painted for his friends Toller Cranston, the Olympic skater and fellow artist, and for Ellen Burka, his coach, on the theme of "folly". Of his working process, he said that his work often started with one very small idea, an impulse and that he just played around with ideas that developed.

In 2025, the book Louis de Niverville: Pentimenti, edited by Thomas Miller and Phillip Ottenbrite was published by Figure 1 Publishing in Victoria, British Columbia, with texts that trace de Niverville's rise in the Toronto scene.

== Selected exhibitions ==
His participation in solo and group exhibitions were many and numerous. He had two museum retrospectives, both at the Robert McLaughlin Gallery in Oshawa. The first, in 1978, showed 20 years of his paintings and travelled to 13 Canadian museums including the Art Gallery of Ontario and Montreal Museum of Fine Arts; the second, in 1997, was of his collages. In 2007, Ingram Gallery in Toronto held a third retrospective. Since 2020, his work has been represented by Loch Gallery in Toronto.

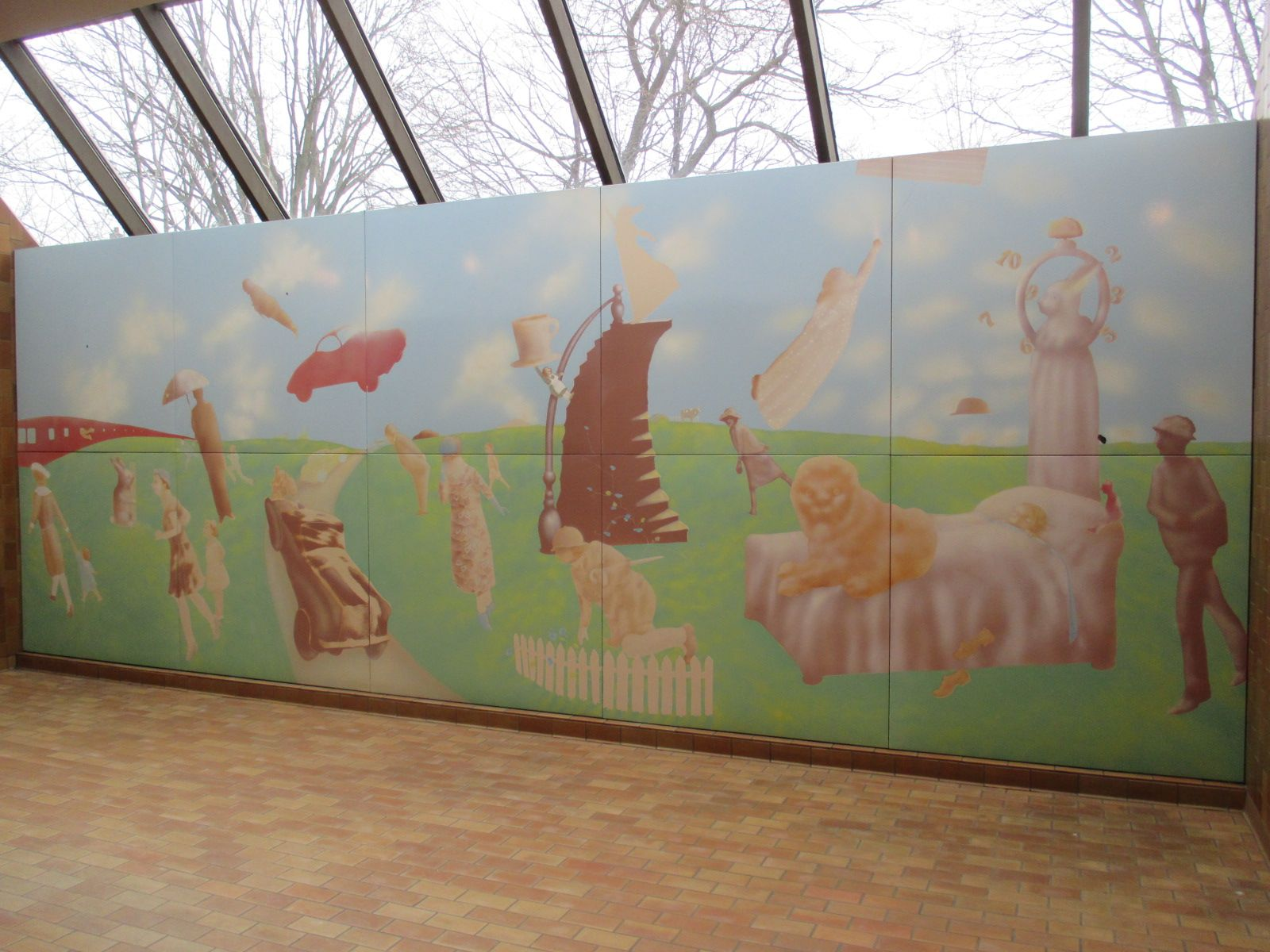
Morning Glory, a mural by de Niverville at Toronto's Spadina station

== Commissions ==
His commissions include two murals for Toronto International Airport (1963), one for the atrium of The Hospital for Sick Children (Toronto) (1993), and one for the Toronto Transit Commission, located at Spadina station, titled Morning Glory.

He also created a mural for Patrick Lannan in 1979 which was in the Lannan apartment in New York but moved later to the Lannan Foundation, Palm Beach and still later, was donated to the Dennos Museum Centre in Traverse City, Michigan. He also had commissions for books which he illustrated such as The Fully Processed Cheese and the film Lady B.

== Selected public collections ==
- Agnes Etherington Art Centre, Kingston
- Art Gallery of Hamilton
- Art Gallery of Ontario, Toronto
- Canada Council Art Bank, Ottawa
- Hirshhorn Museum, Washington
- McIntosh Art Gallery, University of Western Ontario, London, Ontario
- Montreal Museum of Fine Arts (own Ceux Qui Se Rassembient (1973))
- Musée d'art Contemporain, Montreal
- National Gallery of Canada, Ottawa
- The Robert McLaughlin Gallery, Oshawa
- McMaster Museum of Art, Hamilton

== Honours and awards ==
Louis de Niverville was elected a full member of the Royal Canadian Academy of Arts in 1973. In 1982, he won the Victor Martyn Lynch-Staunton Award.
