= David Rabinowitch =

Canadian visual artist (born 1943)

- Born: 1943; Toronto, Ontario, Canada
- Died: 2023
- Known for: Sculptor, Installation artist

David Rabinowitch RCA (born March 6, 1943) is a Canadian visual artist who exhibits internationally and is best known for his non-representational steel constructions that develop the traditions of modernist sculpture. New York Magazine said in 2008 that his work is related to Minimalism, but it comes from a different angle than most American examples such as that of Carl Andre or Richard Serra.

== Career ==
Rabinowitch was born in Toronto, Ontario, and is the twin brother of sculptor Royden Rabinowitch. He studied at the University of Western Ontario and the Ontario College of Art, Toronto. Starting in 1951, he read Spinoza's Ethics; in 1959 he started on Kant's Critique of Pure Reason; and in 1961, on David Hume's Treatise of Human Nature: he considers his reading of these books and other philosophical and literary texts as integral to his practise. The first sculptures he preserved were his Box Trough Assemblages and the Fluid Sheet Constructions, made in 1963 and 1964. His first solo show was at the 20/20 Gallery in London, Ontario in 1968. From 1969 to 1984, the Carmen Lamanna Gallery in Toronto was his dealer. Rabinowitch moved to New York in 1972. Since then, he has had major exhibitions in the U.S., Canada, and Europe.

An interest on his part in Romanesque art led to over twenty years of trips to France to study its monuments. He devoted several series of his own series to his thoughts about it as well. In 1998, he designed nine stained glass windows for the cathedral of Digne-les-Bains.

In 2003, he had a major retrospective at the Musée d'art contemporain de Montréal, his first major solo exhibition in Canada. He is represented by the Peter Blum Gallery in New York. In late 2010 to early 2011, the Peter Blum Gallery exhibited Birth of Romanticism: New Works on Paper. A reviewer wrote of it:

"The wildness of Birth of Romanticism comes as a shock. While Rabinowitch's art has often rippled with sublimated emotion and maculate tactility, these drawings suggest that its internal tensions have precipitated an irreparable rupture with its own past, eradicating its Platonic surface to expose a jarring, multi-leveled parallel world."

In 2019, he exhibited Périgord Construction of Vision Drawings, a series at the Peter Blum Gallery, which derived from his visits to the Périgord region in southern France and visits to Romanesque churches.

He is represented in such collections as the following: the Museum of Modern Art, New York; the Art Institute of Chicago; the National Gallery of Canada, Ottawa; the Art Gallery of Ontario, Toronto; and the Chinati Foundation. He was awarded many Canada Council Grants, including a Senior Grant, a Guggenheim Senior Fellowship (1975), the Canada Council's Victor Martyn Lynch-Staunton Award (1976) and made a member of the Royal Canadian Academy of Arts. He also taught at Yale University (1974-1975) and at Düsseldorf (1984).

== See also ==
- Chinati Foundation
