= Norma Beecroft =

Canadian composer, producer and broadcaster (1934–2024)

- Born: April 11, 1934; Oshawa, Canada
- Died: October 19, 2024 (aged 90); Toronto, Canada
- Occupations: Composer, producer, broadcaster, arts administrator

Norma Marian Beecroft (1934–2024) was a Canadian composer, producer, broadcaster, and arts administrator.

== Early years ==
Born in Oshawa, Beecroft was the daughter of Julian Beecroft, a musician, machinist, and inventor who pioneered the development of magnetic tape, and actress Eleanor Beecroft (née Norton). She received her earliest musical education from her parents, both of whom had musical training. Her father had originally intended to pursue a career as a pianist and had given concerts in his early 20s. His career, however, was cut short when he lost three of his fingers in a woodworking accident. Her parents married in 1931 and their marriage produced four other children (including the poet and painter, Jane Beecroft) besides Norma. The couple divorced in 1947 when Norma was 13 years old.

== Education ==
In 1950 Beecroft began taking private piano lessons with Aladar Ecsedy until she entered the Royal Conservatory of Music in 1952. She attended classes at the Conservatory through 1958 where her teachers included Gordon Hallett (piano), Weldon Kilburn (piano), and John Weinzweig (music theory and composition). In 1957-58 she studied the flute privately with Keith Girard and in the summer of 1958 was a pupil at the Berkshire Music Center where she studied composition with Aaron Copland and Lukas Foss.

In 1959 Beecroft went to Rome to pursue graduate studies in composition with Goffredo Petrassi at the Accademia Nazionale di Santa Cecilia. She remained in that city through 1962 where she also pursued flute studies with Severino Gazzelloni. In the summers of 1960 and 1961 she attended lectures by Bruno Maderna in Darmstadt, Germany, and at the Dartington School in England. In 1962 she returned to Canada to pursue courses in electronic music at the University of Toronto with Myron Schaeffer. After completing these studies, she went to New York to work with Mario Davidovsky at the Columbia-Princeton Electronic Music Center in 1964.

== Career ==
Beecroft began her career working as a script assistant for television music programs for the Canadian Broadcasting Corporation from 1954-57. In 1956-57 she served as president of Canadian Music Associates, which was the Toronto concert committee of the Canadian League of Composers. She continued to work for the CBC in various capacities including as music consultant (1957–59), script assistant (1962–63), talent relations officer (1963–64), and national radio program organizer (1964–66). From 1966-69 she was a producer for CBC Radio of programs such as Organists in Recital, RSVP, and From the Age of Elegance. She hosted and produced Music of Today during these years and continued to appear on the program into the 1970s. She also served as the president of Ten Centuries Concerts from 1965-68.

As a composer, Beecroft is recognized as one of the Canadian pioneers of electronic music. From 1967-76 she worked independently at the Electronic Music Studio at the University of Toronto's Faculty of Music. She focused on multitrack recording and looping as an extension of existing instrumental or vocal sounds. Debussy was an early influence on her aesthetic, which was also shaped by her studies with Weinzweig, Petrassi, and Maderna. The first Canadian woman composer to be educated in Europe, Beecroft was also impressed by Karlheinz Stockhausen, who was among the first composers to blend electronic sounds with live instruments. Her book, Conversations With Post World War II Pioneers of Electronic Music, features composers from that period.

During the 1970s, Beecroft produced documentaries of Canadian composers for CBC Radio including Jean Coulthard, Harry Freedman, Bruce Mather, Barbara Pentland, Harry Somers, Gilles Tremblay, and John Weinzweig. She also created documentaries on Murray Adaskin and Violet Archer for CJRT-FM. In 1975 she produced Music Canada, consisting of 13 broadcast recordings drawn from the collections at Radio Canada International and the Composers, Authors and Publishers Association of Canada. In 1976 she received the Major Armstrong Award for excellence in FM broadcasting for the documentary, The Computer in Music. She later produced electronic music for Shakespeare's Macbeth (1982) and A Midsummer Night's Dream (1983) at the Stratford Festival.

In 1971 Beecroft co-founded, with Robert Aitken, the Toronto contemporary music series, New Music Concerts, for which she served as the organization's president through 1989. She was a member of the music faculty at York University from 1984-87 where she taught electronic music and composition. She later returned there as a guest lecturer as well as at the University of Montreal.

A member of the Canadian League of Composers and an associate of the Canadian Music Centre, Beecroft twice won the Canada Council's Lynch-Staunton Award. She wrote works for the Atlantic Symphony Orchestra, CBC, Canadian Electronic Ensemble, The Music Gallery, National Arts Centre Orchestra, National Ballet of Canada, Quebec Contemporary Music Society, Toronto Symphony Orchestra, and York Winds. She served on the juries of the SOCAN Awards and the Jules Léger Prize for New Chamber Music, and was an honorary member of the Canadian Electroacoustic Community. She received an honorary doctorate from York University in 1996.

The Beecroft portrait in the Canadian Composers Portraits series was released in 2003.

Between Composers, a volume of correspondence between Beecroft and Harry Somers written in 1959-60 (they were in a romantic relationship at the time), was published in 2024.

Beecroft donated many of her manuscripts, papers, and recordings to the archives at the University of Calgary.
