= Royden Rabinowitch =

Canadian sculptor (born 1943)

- Born: March 6, 1943 (age 83); Toronto, Ontario, Canada
- Known for: Sculptor
- Awards: Officer, Order of Canada, 2002 Life Member of Clare Hall, Cambridge, 1986

Royden Rabinowitch, OC (born March 6, 1943) is a Canadian post-minimalist sculptor who exhibits internationally. Rabinowitch was elected Visiting Associate 1983/84; Visiting Fellow 1984/85 and Life Member 1986 of Clare Hall, Cambridge University. In 2002, he was appointed Officer of the Order of Canada (OC). He lives and works in Ghent, Cambridge, UK, and Waterloo, Ontario.

== Early years ==
Rabinowitch was born in Toronto, Ontario, and is the cerebral, reclusive twin brother of sculptor David Rabinowitch. He studied at the University of Western Ontario, London, and briefly at the Ontario College of Art, Toronto. After beginning his career in Toronto in the early 1960s, he moved to London, Ontario. He moved to New York City in 1974.

== Career ==
His first solo show in New York was in 1978 at the John Weber Gallery. In Europe, he was represented by Peter Pakesch in Vienna. His first European retrospective at the Städtisches Museum Abteiberg, Mönchengladbach, in 1985, was curated by Johannes Cladders. He has shown widely in Europe including solo shows at Kunstmuseum, Bern; Wiener Secession, Vienna; Gemeentemuseum, Den Haag; Museum Sztuki, Lodz; Stedelijk Museum, Amsterdam; and Musée d'art Moderne et Contemporain, Geneva, among many others. Because he saw the art scene as mostly compromised by the ethos of advertising, he largely retreated to Cambridge, only occasionally showing with curators such as Wiesław Borowski, Rudi Fuchs, Jan Hoet, and Harald Szeemann.

In the 1980s Rabinowitch started to construct works that were seen, by chance, to relate to particular public places. These constructions, listed chronologically, are: Judgment on the Keplerian Revolution (Furkapasshöhe, Swiss Alps), Newton on Top of Aristotle (Sarabhai Retreat, Ahmedabad, India), Éloges de Fontenelle (Toronto Convention Centre), Leibniz and Newton (Neue Nationalgalerie Platz, Berlin), Tyco and Jepp (Kornwestheim Bahnhof), Judgment of Newton's Principle of Inertia (John's Castle, Limerick), Galileo's Judgment on Ptolemy and Copernicus (WATARI-UM, Tokyo), Judgment on the Copernican Revolution (chosen by Berlin Mitte for Leipziger Platz), and Bell for Kepler (Sesquicentennial Plaza, Waterloo, Ontario).

Works by Royden Rabinowitch are in museum collections worldwide including the Solomon R. Guggenheim Museum, New York; Centre Pompidou, Paris; Tate Modern, London; Stedelijk Museum, Amsterdam; Watari Museum of Contemporary Art, Tokyo; Neue Nationalgalerie, Berlin; Kunsthaus Zürich; MAMCO, Geneva; National Gallery of Australia, Canberra; Rupf Foundation, Kunstmuseum Bern; Fitzwilliam Museum, Cambridge; and Moderna Museet, Stockholm. In late 2014, the largest private collection of Rabinowitch's work, which is situated in the Hooft Collection in Ghent, Belgium, was opened to the public.

== Awards and honours ==
Rabinowitch received the Victor Martyn Lynch-Staunton Award from the Canada Council in 1985. In 2002, he was appointed an Officer of the Order of Canada (OC). That same year, he received Queen Elizabeth II's Golden Jubilee Medal. In 2012, he was honored in Canada with a Governor General's Award for excellence in visual and media arts, which recognized his nearly-50-year career as a sculptor. Also in 2012, he received Queen Elizabeth II's Diamond Jubilee Medal.
