= Roland Poulin =

Canadian artist (born 1940)

- Born: 17 April 1940 (age 86); St. Thomas, Ontario, Canada
- Education: École des Beaux-Arts de Montréal (1964–1969)
- Known for: sculptor

Roland Poulin (born 17 April 1940) is a Canadian contemporary sculptor whose work is characterized by its horizontality and weightiness. He has lived in Sainte-Angèle-de-Monnoir, Quebec, since 1986.

== Career ==
Poulin was born in St. Thomas, Ontario, and with his family moved to Montreal in 1944. He had a job as an assistant graphic designer in an advertising agency when a colleague took him to the Montreal Museum of Fine Arts and he saw The Black Star by Paul-Émile Borduas. Seeing the painting had a decisive impact on him. He said of it later:

What I felt in Borduas' painting was a certain relativity in reading, and that's still what I work with today.

Subsequently, Poulin read about Borduas and the Refus global, as well as beginning to draw and paint. He took the entrance exam to the École des Beaux-Arts de Montréal, but when he was refused, enrolled in evening classes at the school. After two years of study, he was accepted into the day class. He studied there from 1964 to 1969. After graduating in 1969, Poulin worked as an assistant to painter Mario Merola. In his own work, he chose sculpture as his medium.

A 1972 trip to Germany introduced him to American Minimalism. Later, Poulin made visits to cemeteries in New England and Paris, as well as to an exhibition of Ancient Egyptian sarcophagi in New York. He found in these monuments an inspiration for his later sculptures. From 1973 to 1981, he taught at Université Laval in Quebec City and in the Visual Arts department at the University of Ottawa (1987–2005).

In 1994, the National Gallery of Canada organized a retrospective of his works, and in 1999, the Musée d'art contemporain de Montréal organized another major exhibition.

== Work ==
Poulin's career as a sculptor falls into two main periods. In the late 1970s, his work leaned towards American Minimalism. His sculptures had simple forms and were made of inexpensive industrial materials such as glass, plywood, wire mesh and reinforced concrete. Concrete was his choice for an important series organized around a central empty space, with individual titles such as Without (1979, Musée national des beaux-arts du Québec). In the 1980s, he applied a metaphorical language to his work, derived from reading Hymns to the Night by the mystic poet Novalis and visiting Père Lachaise Cemetery in Paris. His dark-painted wood sculptures with their simple forms recall tombstones or coffins. In addition, Poulin used expressive titles such as Lamento and La Part de l'ombre (The Shadow Side) (1985–1986, Musée national des beaux-arts du Québec). Later pieces, such as Thresholds (1993, National Gallery of Canada) are increasingly oriented towards the spiritual.

== Selected exhibitions ==
- 1971 - Structure immatérielle, Laser beams and rays of light, Roland Poulin, Musée d'art contemporain de Montréal, Montréal;
- 1983 - Roland Poulin, Sculptures et dessins 1982 - 1983, Musée d'art contemporain, Montréal;
- 1984 - Roland Poulin, Sculptures and Drawings, Agnes Etherington Art Centre, Queen's University, Kingston;
- 1986 - Roland Poulin, locaux de la revue Parachutes, Montréal; Roland Poulin, Sculptures and Drawings, 49e Parallèle, Canadian Cultural Centre, New York; Museum Van Hedendaagse Kunst, Gand, Belgique, 1987;
- 1990 - Roland Poulin: Sculptures and Drawings, Canada House, London; Roland Poulin: Sculpture, MacDonald Stewart Art Centre (Art Gallery of Guelph), Guelph, Ontario;
- 1992 - Roland Poulin, City gallery in the Museum Folkwang, Essen, Germany;
- 1994 - Roland Poulin: Retrospective, National Gallery of Canada;
- 1999 - Roland Poulin, Musée d'art contemporain de Montréal, Montréal.

== Selected public collections ==
- Agnes Etherington Art Centre, Queen's University, Kingston;
- Art Gallery of Hamilton, Hamilton;
- Art Windsor Essex;
- Musée des beaux-arts du Québec, Québec;
- National Gallery of Canada, Ottawa;
- Nickle Galleries, University of Calgary, Calgary.

== Commissions ==
- 1974 - Plein air '74, Musée d'art contemporain de Montréal, Montréal;
- 1977 - Art Park - The Program in Visual Arts, Earl W. Bridges Artwork, Lewiston, New York;
- 1978 - Project Studio One (P.S.I) Institute for Art and Urban Resources, Inc. (The Institute for Contemporary Art), Long Island City, Queens, New York;
- 1986 - Lumières, Perception-Projection, Les cent jours de l'art contemporain, Centre International d'art contemporain de Montréal, Montréal;
- 1998 - Axis Mundi, installation in the garden of the Musée d'art contemporain de Montréal, Montréal;
- 2009 - Continuum, Park of the promenade Bellerive, Montréal;
- 2010 - Nos regards se tournent vers la lumière, Promenade Samuel-De-Champlain, Québec City.

== Awards ==
- Ozias-Leduc prize (1992) from the Fondation Émile-Nelligan;
- Victor Martyn Lynch-Staunton Award (1996) from the Canada Council for the Arts;
- Jean-A. Chalmers Prize (1998) from the Chalmers Foundation, Toronto;
- Prix Paul-Émile-Borduas (2001) from the, Conseil des arts et des lettres du Québec;
- Governor General's Award in Visual and Media Arts (2005).
