= Claude Péloquin =

Canadian poet, writer, singer, songwriter, screenwriter, and director (1942–2018)

Claude Péloquin (1942 – 25 November 2018) was a Québécois poet, writer, singer, songwriter, screenwriter, and director.

Péloquin published more than twenty books of poetry. He was also the author of many popular songs, including Robert Charlebois' Lindberg, for which he won the Félix Award in 1969. He collaborated with notable Quebec musicians including Robert Charlebois.

== Career ==
Prolific multimedia artist, Claude Péloquin became known as part of the Quebec counterculture movement of the 1960s.

Péloquin co-wrote the lyrics of Lindberg (1968), composed and performed by Robert Charlebois, which won the Félix Award for Song of the Year. The two continued to work together on music through the 1970s and 1980s.

He also wrote scripts, essays, novels, and created visual art, often blending poetic and political expression. Péloquin is widely remembered for the phrase « Vous êtes pas écœurés de mourir bande de caves? C’est assez! » displayed on a mural at the Montreal metro station Crémazie in 1967, which became emblematic of the Quiet Revolution's spirit of social questioning. Throughout his career, he produced more than 20 collections of poetry and collaborated with major Québec cultural figures.

He died in Montreal at the age of 76.
