= Harry Freedman =

Canadian musician (1922–2005)

- Born: April 22, 1922; Łódź, Poland
- Died: September 16, 2005 (aged 83); Toronto, Canada
- Occupations: Composer, English hornist, teacher

Harry Freedman, OC (Polish: Henryk Frydmann; April 5, 1922 – September 16, 2005) was a Canadian composer, English hornist and teacher.

He wrote a range of orchestral works including the scores to films such as The Bloody Brood (1959), Isabel (1968), The Act of the Heart (1970), The Pyx (1973) and The Courage of Kavik the Wolf Dog. He also wrote the music for six ballets, an opera, incidental music for the theatre, vocal art songs and choral works, and a substantial amount of chamber music.

== Biography ==
He was born on April 5, 1922 in Łódź. At age three, Freedman emigrated with his family from Poland to Canada where the family settled in Medicine Hat, Alberta. His father worked in the fur trade. Freedman was nine when his family relocated to Winnipeg. He enrolled at the Winnipeg School of Art to study painting when he was 14.

Freedman's musical training began relatively late. An admirer of big band music, he began taking his first lessons on the clarinet in 1940 when he was 18. His teacher, Arthur Hart, would eventually become the principal clarinetist of the Winnipeg Symphony Orchestra and it is from him that Freedman got his first exposure to symphonic music. His musical training was interrupted with the outbreak of World War II, and he spent the years 1941–1945 as a member of the Royal Canadian Air Force. In 1945, he entered the Royal Conservatory of Music, where he studied from 1945 to 1951. His most influential teachers were his composition professor, John Weinzweig, and his oboe instructor, Perry Bauman. He also spent the summers at the Tanglewood Music Center where he was a pupil of Olivier Messiaen and Aaron Copland.

In 1946, Freedman became a member of the Toronto Symphony Orchestra as an English hornist, remaining with the orchestra through 1971. In 1951, he helped to co-found the Canadian League of Composers, later serving as the president from 1975 to 1978.

In 1972–1981, he taught at the Courtenay Youth Music Centre where he was also the composer-in-residence. Among his notable pupils was Gilles Bellemare. In 1977, he was the subject of a radio documentary produced by Norma Beecroft for the CBC. In 1979–1981, he was the president of the Guild of Canadian Film Composers and, from 1985 to 1990, he was music officer for the Toronto Arts Council. From 1989 to 1991, he served on the music faculty of the University of Toronto, where he taught classes in composition and orchestration.

Freedman received a Juno Award nomination in 1996 for his orchestral work, Touchings, which was recorded by the Esprit Orchestra with the Nexus percussion ensemble. He won a composition prize in 1998 at the International Rostrum of Composers for Borealis, a symphonic work co-commissioned by the Toronto Symphony Orchestra, Soundstreams Canada, and CBC Radio.

In 1980 the Canadian Music Council named him composer of the year, and he was appointed an Officer of the Order of Canada in 1984.

A six-record set of Freedman's music was included in the Anthology of Canadian Music series in 1981. The Freedman portrait in the Canadian Composers Portraits series was released in 2002.

Freedman died in Toronto on September 16, 2005. He was married (1951) to the soprano, Mary Morrison.

== See also ==
- Music of Canada
- List of Canadian composers
