= Eric Cameron =

Canadian artist (1935–2026)

- Born: April 18, 1935; Leicester, England
- Died: January 29, 2026 (aged 90); Didsbury, Alberta, Canada
- Education: University of Durham, Courtauld Institute
- Known for: Artist

Eric Cameron RCA (April 18, 1935 – January 29, 2026) was a Canadian artist who lived in Calgary, Alberta, known for his conceptual art work and as a writer and educator.

== Life and career ==
Cameron was educated at the University of Durham (graduated 1957), and the Courtauld Institute (1959). He moved to Canada in 1969. His earlier works include the Process Paintings produced with masking tape grids and often brightly coloured, mostly from the 1960s. His videotapes date mainly from 1973 to 1976. In 1979, Cameron began applying coats of gesso to some objects that just happened to be lying around his Halifax apartment. Thereafter, a total of sixty or so Thick Paintings were initiated by Caneron; about half are in museum collections across Canada, while the rest continued to be worked on.

He taught for a total of 47 years at universities in England and Canada until 2020 and was the recipient of the 1992 Canada Council's Victor Martyn Lynch-Staunton Award and the Governor General's Award in 2004. He was a member of the Royal Canadian Academy of Arts. His works are held in the collections of the Glenbow Museum, the National Gallery of Canada, the Art Gallery of Ontario, the Musée d'art contemporain de Montréal, and the Centre national des arts plastiques, Paris.

Cameron died on January 29, 2026, at the age of 90.

== Bibliography ==
- Nasgaard, Roald (2008). Abstract Painting in Canada. Douglas & McIntyre. pp. 350–353. ISBN 9781553653943.
