= Ingólfur Arnarsson =

Icelandic artist

Ingólfur Arnarsson is an Icelandic artist born in 1956.

Arnarsson's drawings are characterized by delicate lines, precision and time. He has also painted on concrete.

His work can be found in the following collections:

- National Gallery of Iceland, Reykjavik, Iceland
- Reykjavik Municipal Art Museum, Reykjavik, Iceland
- Living Art Museum, Reykjavik, Iceland
- Hafnarborg, The Hafnarfjordur Centre of Culture and Fine Art, Iceland
- Art Museum of Isafjordur, Iceland
- Museum Moderner Kunst, Landkreis Cuxhaven, Germany
- Abteiberg Museum, Mönchengladbach, Germany
- Chinati Foundation, Marfa, Texas, USA
- Kunstmuseum Bonn, Germany
- Maxine and Stuart Frankel Foundation for Art, Michigan, USA
- Safn, Reykjavík, Iceland
