= Francine Larivée =

Canadian artist

- Born: 1942 (age 83–84); Montreal

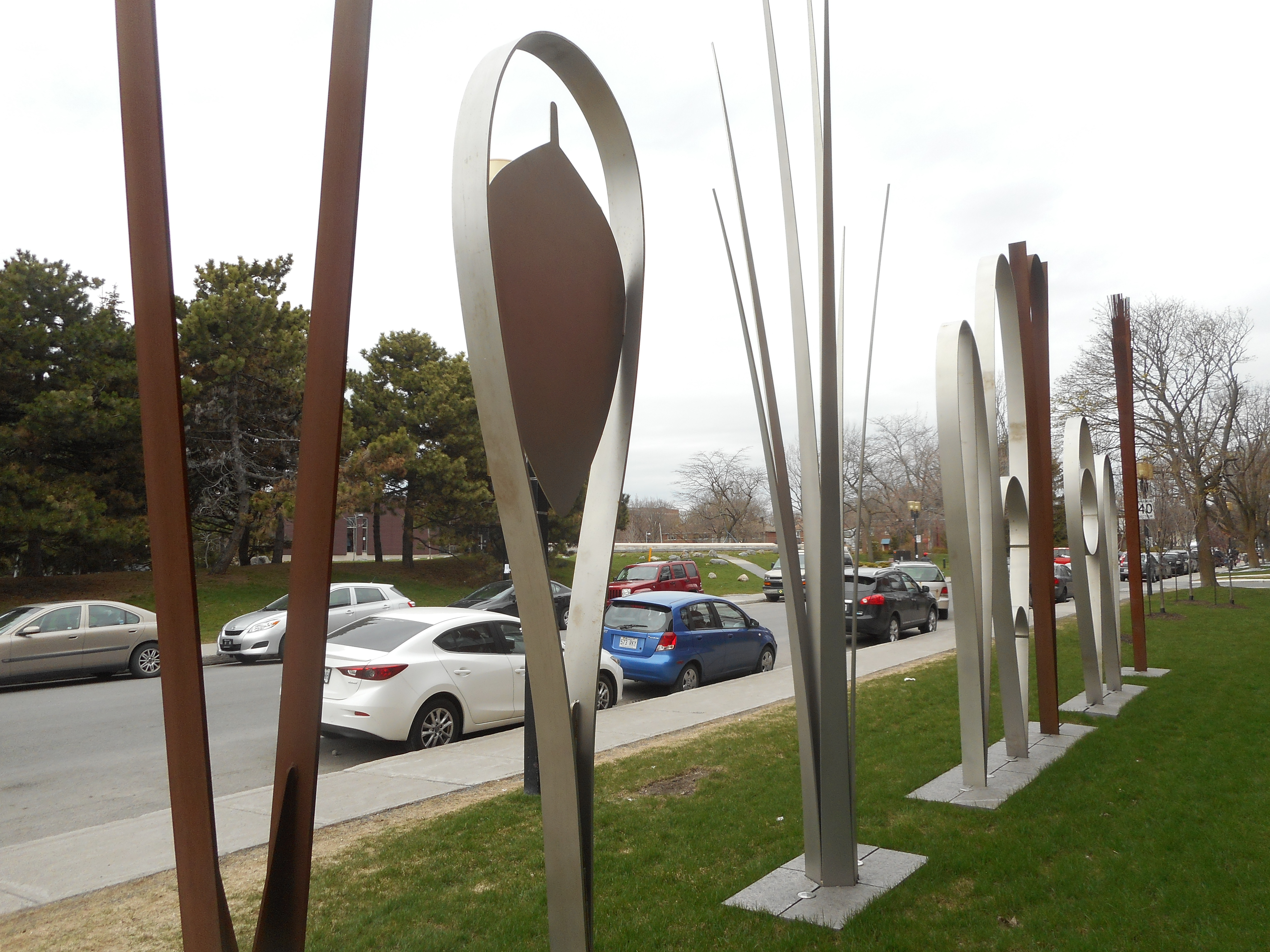
L'apprivoisement, a public art work by Francine Larivée in Montreal, Quebec.

Francine Larivée (born 1942) is a Canadian artist who presented her figural imagery in conceptual art projects and full-scale sculptures.

Larivée graduated from the École des beaux-arts de Montréal in 1965, and received a BA degree in art history from the Université du Québec à Montréal in 1973.

Her work is included in the City of Montreal public art collection and in the collections of the Musée national des beaux-arts du Québec and the National Gallery of Canada.

== See also ==
- Lisette Lemieux
