= Betty Goodwin =

Canadian artist (1923–2008)

- Born: Betty Roodish; March 19, 1923; Montreal, Quebec, Canada
- Died: December 1, 2008 (aged 85); Montreal, Quebec
- Spouse: Martin Goodwin (m. 1945; died 2008)
- Children: 1

Betty Roodish Goodwin, CM RCA (March 19, 1923 – December 1, 2008) was a multidisciplinary Canadian artist who sought to express the complexity of human experience through her work.

== Early life ==
Goodwin was born in Montreal, as the child of Romanian emigrants Clare Edith and Abraham Roodish. She enjoyed painting and drawing as a child, and was encouraged by her mother to pursue art. Goodwin's parents first settled in the United States, but when her father Abraham, who was a tailor, struggled to find work, they moved to Montreal, where Abraham established Rochester Vest Manufacturing Company Ltd. in 1928. Still, they struggled financially. When Goodwin was nine years old, her father suffered a heart attack and died. This traumatic experience impacted Goodwin throughout her life, and went on to influence her art. After graduating from high school, Goodwin studied design at Valentine's Commercial School of Art in Montreal.

== Career ==
In her work, Goodwin used a variety of media, including collage, sculpture, printmaking, painting and drawing, assemblage and etchings. Her art often involved themes of humanity, loss, and emotion. Many of her ideas came from clusters of photographs, objects, or drawings on the walls in her studio. She also used the "germ" of ideas that are left after being erased from a work. Goodwin launched her career as a painter and printmaker in the late 1940s. During the 1950s and 1960s, Goodwin created still life paintings. She also depicted scenes of Montreal's Jewish Community.

In 1968, she enrolled in an etching class with Yves Gaucher at Sir George Williams University in Montreal. It was there where she began working with found objects and clothing and how they held traces of life, in her prints, which brought her international attention. Goodwin revolutionized the medium of printmaking when, in 1968, she began putting pieces of clothing through a printing press. From this experiment, she developed innovative prints, including her iconic Vest series.

Dissatisfied with her work, Betty destroyed most of it and in 1968 she limited herself to drawing. From 1972 to 1974, she created a series of wall hangings entitled Tarpaulin, which she reworked to shape into sculptures and collages.

Over a period of six years beginning in 1982, Goodwin explored the human form in her drawing series Swimmers, a project which used graphite, oil pastels and charcoal on translucent Mylar. The large-scale drawings depict solitary floating or sinking bodies, suspended in space. In 1986, to show the interaction of human figures she created her series Carbon using charcoal and wax for her drawings. Two more series followed: La mémoire du corps (1990–1995) and Nerves (1993–1995).

She died in December 2008 in Montreal.

== Personal ==
In 1945, Betty Goodwin married Martin Goodwin, a civil engineer (d. 2008). They had their son Paul in 1946. Goodwin experienced immense loss when her son Paul died of a drug overdose at age 30.

== Selected exhibitions ==
Solo exhibitions

- 1976 - Betty Goodwin 1969-76, Musée d'art contemporain de Montréal, Quebec
- 1996 - Betty Goodwin: Signs of Life, National Gallery of Canada, Ottawa
- 1998 - The Art of Betty Goodwin, Art Gallery of Ontario, Toronto
- 2002 - The Prints of Betty Goodwin, National Gallery of Canada, Ottawa

Group exhibitions

- 1955 - Print Exhibition, Montreal Museum of Fine Arts, Quebec
- 1967 - Burnaby Print Show, Burnaby Art Gallery, Burnaby, BC
- 1974 - Spanish International Biennial Exhibition of Fine Prints, Segovia, Spain
- 1986 - Installations-Fictions, Galerie Graff, Montreal, Quebec
- 1991 - Betty Goodwin, Espacc la Tranchefile, Montreal
- 1993 - Fawbush Gallery; New York, New York; Les Femmeuses 92, Pratt et Whitney Canada, Montreal, Quebec
- 1994 - La Ferme Du Buisson, Centre d'art contemporian, Noisiel, France
- 1996 - Stephen Friedman Gallery, London
- 1999 - Cosmos, Montreal Museum of Fine Arts, Quebec
- 2000 - Odd Bodies, Oakville Galleries, Oakville, Ontario; Betty Goodwin, Jack Shainman Gallery, New York, New York

== Notable artworks ==
- 1979: Rue Mentana
- 1985: Moving Towards Fire
- 1988–1989: Steel Note

== Selected collections ==
Her work is represented in many public collections, including the Art Gallery of Ontario, the National Gallery of Canada, the Musée d'art contemporain de Montréal, the Montreal Museum of Fine Arts, the city of Burnaby art collection, and the Winnipeg Art Gallery.

== Honours ==
- Victor Martyn Lynch-Staunton Award of the Canada Council for the Arts (1981)
- Banff Centre National Award for Visual Arts (1984)
- Prix Paul-Émile Borduas (1986)
- Guggenheim Foundation Fellowship (1988)
- Gershon Iskowitz Prize (1995)
- Harold Town Prize in drawing (1998)
- Governor General’s Award in Visual and Media Arts (2003)
- Order of Canada (2003)
- Royal Canadian Academy of Arts
- honorary doctorates from universities across Canada

== See also ==
- Lisette Lemieux
