= Serge Tousignant =

Canadian artist (born 1942)

- Born: May 28, 1942 (age 84); Montreal, Quebec, Canada
- Education: Albert Dumouchel's studio
- Known for: Photography
- Elected: Royal Canadian Academy 2004

Serge Tousignant RCA (born May 28, 1942) is a Canadian multidisciplinary artist and a photographer who lives in Montreal.

== Career ==
After receiving his graphic arts diploma from the École des Beaux-Arts de Montréal in 1962, Tousignant began to study lithography and etching in the studio of Albert Dumouchel. He continued his studies from 1962 to 1965 at the Slade School of Fine Art, University College of London, England, where he studied painting and lithography. His early work was as a multidisciplinary artist, but he stopped painting after 1967. In 1967, he began producing sculpture that plays on illusion and engages the viewer in participation. In 1972, he began to use photography, which is the medium he has continued to use. He found that photography gave him the possibility of images that were at once "graphic, sculptural, spatial and painterly". In 1978, he began the photographic series Geometrisation solaire, based on arrangements of sticks and the shadows they cast. The shadows of the sticks form geometric figures.

His work has been exhibited nationally and internationally, notably in a solo travelling exhibition titled Serge Tousignant: Phases In Photography held at the Canadian Museum of Contemporary Photography in 1992 and in numerous group exhibitions such as Lumières: Perceptions and Projections as part of the CIAC’s 100 Days of Contemporary Art, Montreal (1986). In 2017, a retrospective entitled Serge Tousignant: Research Papers was held in Montreal at VOX, Centre de l'image contemporaine, of all the different formulations of his work from printmaking to photography. The Montreal Museum of Contemporary Art held a two-person show of Luis Jacob and Serge Tousignant titled I See What You Are Looking At of Tousignaut's sculpture in 2019. His work resides in public collections such as the National Gallery of Canada, the Montreal Museum of Fine Arts, the Musée national des beaux-arts du Québec, the Victoria and Albert Museum, the Tate Gallery, and in many other art galleries.

Tousignant was a founding member of the artist-run gallery Véhicule and played an important role in the development of the Montreal art scene of the 1970s. He was also a professor at the University of Montreal Art History department from 1974 to 2002. He is represented by Galerie Graff in Montreal.

== Awards ==
Serge Tousignant received the Bridgestone Art Gallery Award at the 5th International Print Biennial of Tokyo, and the Sculpture Award at Perspective 67, the Canadian Centennial Commission Exhibition. He became a member of the Royal Canadian Academy in 2004.
