= Nancy Petry (artist) =

Canadian artist (1931–2024)

Nancy Petry RCA
- Born: Nancy Virginie Petry; 10 April 1931; Montreal, Quebec, Canada
- Died: 18 November 2024 (aged 93)
- Website: nancypetry.com

Nancy Virginie Petry RCA (10 April 1931 – 18 November 2024) was a Canadian artist. She was known for innovation within the field of painting, photography, film and performance art. As one of the first Canadian artists to paint in the style of lyrical abstraction, her work was featured at London's Commonwealth Institute, at the Musée d'art contemporain de Montréal, and in a National Gallery of Canada touring exhibition. She was also instrumental in establishing the Association des graveurs du Québec and contributed to the success of the Montreal alternative art cooperative, Véhicule Art. In 2015 the "Nancy Petry Award" was instituted.

== Early life ==
Nancy Petry was born on 10 April 1931 and raised in Montreal, Quebec. In 1948, she attended McGill University where she studied painting under John Goodwin Lyman and John Fox. After graduating with a Bachelor of Fine Arts in 1952, she traveled for a year throughout Europe before resuming art training in Paris in 1954. She attended the Académie Julian, and studied under Henri Goetz at the Académie de la Grande Chaumière and under Stanley William Hayter at Atelier 17. In 1956, her first solo exhibition was held at Galerie Voyelles in Paris. Later that year, Petry's work became less figurative and she turned to abstract art while living in Ibiza, Spain, from 1958 to 1959.

== Career ==
As one of the first artists in Quebec to adopt lyrical abstraction, Petry's 1959 solo exhibition at Galerie Agnès Lefort in Montreal drew attention for "simplicity and economy of harmonious line, form and colour". In 1962, the National Gallery of Canada organized a solo exhibition of her work, Paintings and Watercolours which toured Western Canada from September 1962 to May 1963. Although Petry moved to London, England, in 1962, she continued to exhibit in Canada with a solo exhibition of paintings, Recent Works, held at Galerie Agnès Lefort in 1963. In the United Kingdom, she participated in the 1966 Second Commonwealth Biennial of Abstract Art in London and in the 1967 Canadian Abstract Art Centennial Exhibition held in both London and Edinburgh. In 1968, she attended the Slade School of Art for post-graduate lithography and studied under Stanley Jones. In 1969, a solo exhibition of her paintings was held at the Commonwealth Institute (London).

By 1970, Petry divided her time between Montreal and London. In Montreal, she joined the print-making studio GRAFF and participated in a group exhibition at North Carolina State University. In 1975, Nancy Petry was one of seven artists invited by the Musée d'art contemporain de Montréal to paint "in situ" at the exhibition Processus '75. Her work Air Currents, composed of sixteen 30"x 48" panels, was noted for its "extreme lightness of treatment, form and material". In 1976, Petry exhibited in the Musée d'art contemporain de Montréal's group show Cent Onze Dessins du Québec. The following year, the National Gallery of Canada toured One Hundred and Eleven Drawings of Quebec across Canada.

In the mid-1970s, Petry's art evolved to include happenings, art interventions and new media. In 1975, she joined the artist-run Véhicule Art, Montreal's first parallel gallery for alternative art including installation, performance and multimedia art. In 1978, she attended a 16mm film-making course conducted by Jenny Okun at the London Film-Makers' Co-op and began incorporating film into her art. In 1979, she created The Shadow Figure collaborating with dancers Édouard Lock and Michelle Fèbvre at Vehicule Art, and Les Naiades with dancer Bonnie Farmer at Montreal's Concordia University in 1994. Her participation in performance art resulted in what critic Jacques-Bernard Roumanes described as "a new pictorial writing based on movement".

Petry also participated in the 2000, 2004, and 2006 London Biennale. In 2008, a retrospective exhibition of her work was held at the Musée des beaux-arts de Mont-Saint-Hilaire, Quebec. Inspired by travel throughout her career, Voyages, a solo exhibition of her early work held at Montreal's Beaux-arts des Amériques gallery in 2014, traced her transition from figurative to abstract art.

In 2015, the Nancy Petry Award was established. Artist Rachel Crummey was presented with the first award on 16 May at the RCA Annual General Assembly held at the Musée d'art contemporain de Montréal.

== Contribution ==
In recognition of her contribution to the visual arts, Petry was inducted into the Royal Canadian Academy of Art (RCA) in 2015. As a multidisciplinary artist, Petry influenced painting, print-making and performance art in Canada. In 1970, she co-founded with Robert Savoie and René Derouin, the Association des graveurs du Québec which later became the Conseil des graveurs du Québec. From 1977 to 1980 as Vice-Chair and Gallery Coordinator at Véhicule Art, Petry brought many national and international artists to Montreal, including: Nan Hoover, Miller and Cameron, and Reindeer Werk. She was also Véhicule Art's delegate to Arte Fiera in Bologna in 1977 and 1978, and was instrumental in "establishing the gallery as the main venue of performance art in Canada".

Petry's work is found in public collections throughout the Commonwealth including: The British Museum in London, National Gallery of Australia in Canberra, National Library of Canada and Canada Council Art Bank in Ottawa, Musée d'art contemporain de Montréal, Bibliothèque et Archives nationales du Québec in Montreal, and Confederation Centre Art Gallery in Charlottetown. Her work is also in the collections of the National Centre for Contemporary Arts in Kaliningrad, Russia, Galleria de arte do Sesi in São Paulo, Brazil, and the Museum of New Art in Detroit.

== Death ==
Petry died on 18 November 2024, at the age of 93.
