= Whittome =

Whittome is a surname. Notable people with the surname include:

- Irene Whittome (born 1942), Canadian artist
- Nadia Whittome (born 1996), British politician
