= Grande Bibliothèque =

National library building of Québec, in Montréal

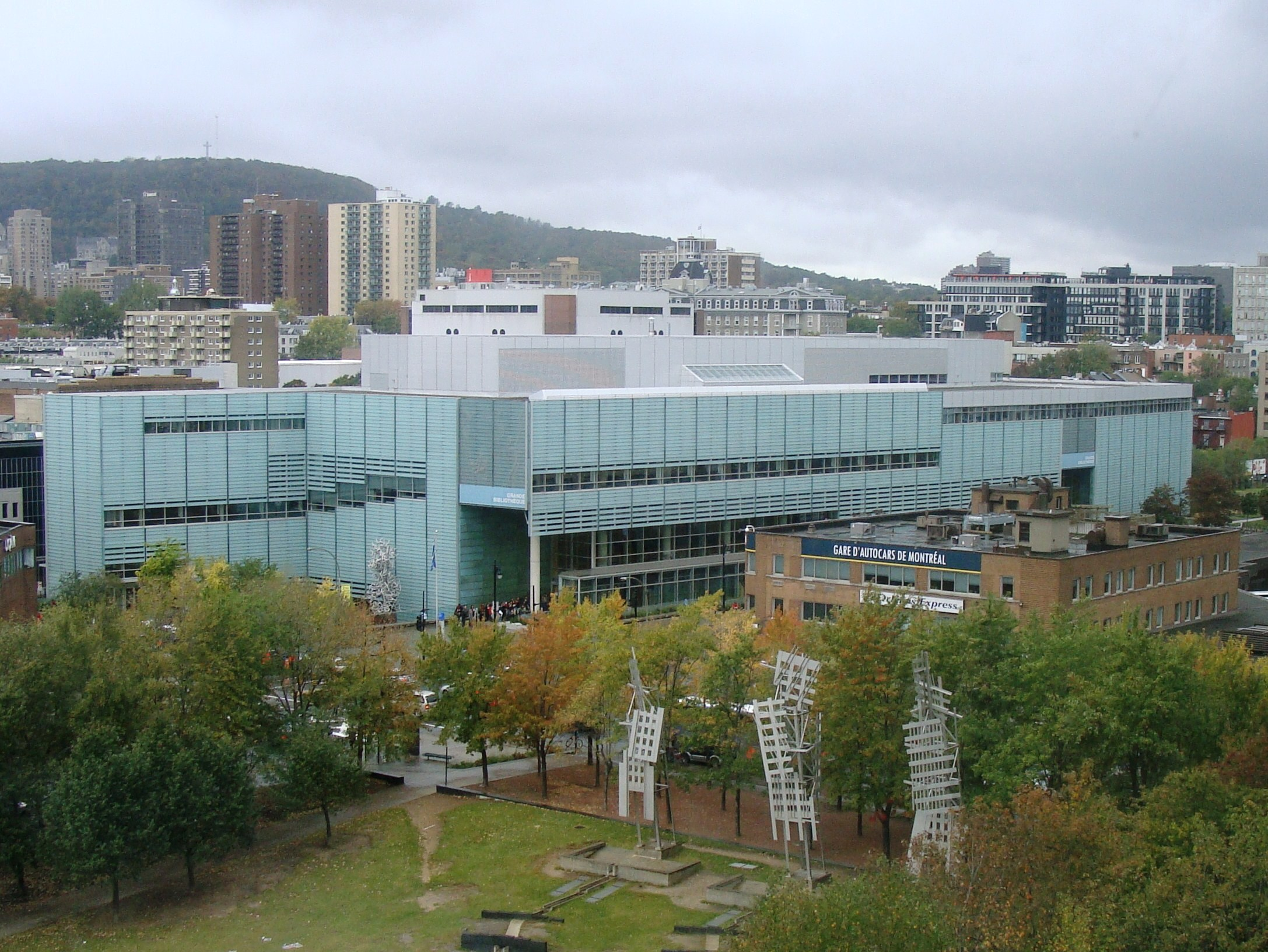
- Interactive map of the Grande Bibliothèque area

General information
- Type: Public library
- Location: 475 De Maisonneuve Boulevard east Montreal, Quebec; H2L 5C4
- Coordinates: 45.5156°N 73.5624°W
- Construction started: 2001
- Opened: 30 April 2005
- Cost: $90.6 million
- Owner: Bibliothèque et Archives nationales du Québec

Technical details
- Floor count: 5
- Floor area: 33,000 m^{2} (360,000 sq ft)

Design and construction
- Architecture firm: Patkau Architects; Croft-Pelletier/Gilles Guité

Website
- banq.qc.ca

Grande Bibliothèque
- Established: October 2002
- Architects: Marie-Chantal Croft, Patkau Architects

Collection
- Items collected: books, e-books, music, cds, periodicals, maps, genealogical archives, business directories, local history,
- Size: 4 million items

The Grande Bibliothèque (French pronunciation: [ɡʁɑ̃d biblijɔtɛk]) is a public library in Downtown Montreal, Quebec, Canada. Its collection is part of Bibliothèque et Archives nationales du Québec (BAnQ), Quebec's national library.

Membership in the library is free to all residents of Quebec. It has some 10,000 users per day and a record of 3 million users in 2009—double the projected figure of 1.5 million for that year. In 2011, it attracted 2.7 million visitors, and was the most frequented public library in both North America and the Francophonie.

== Collection ==
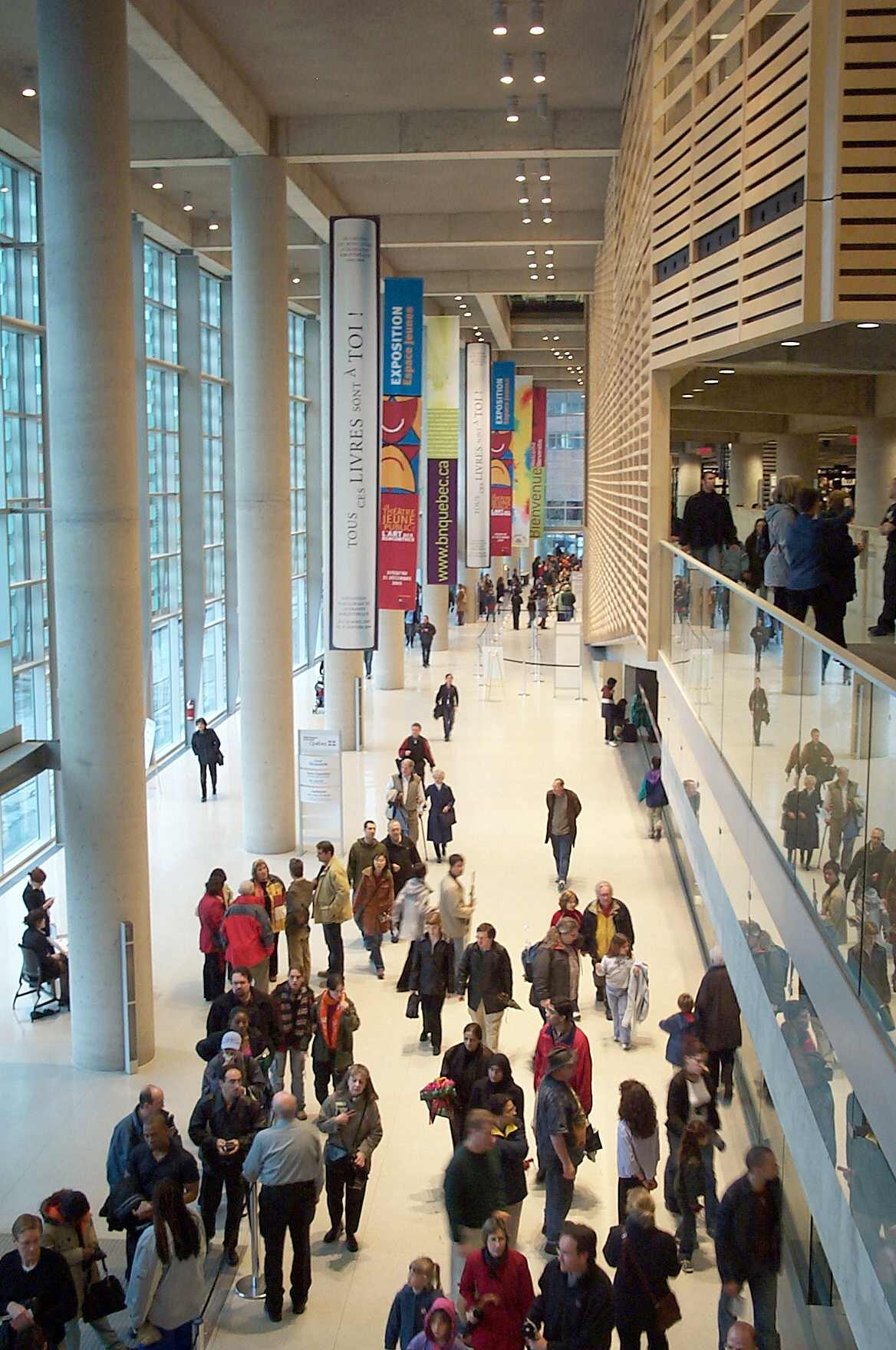
The main entrance hall of the GB.

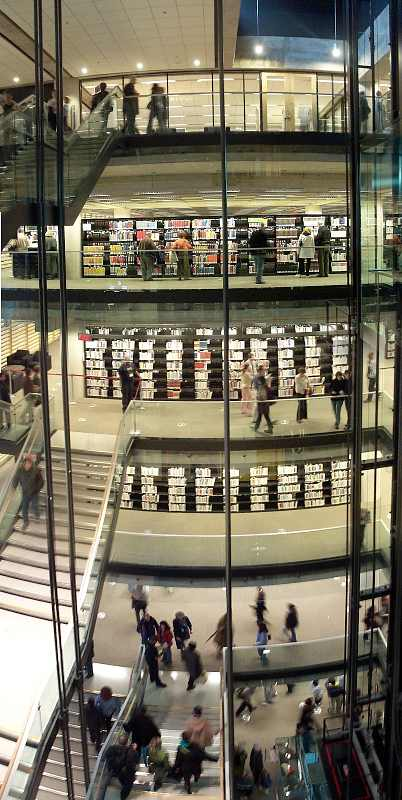
The central volume of the GB, with the shelves of the Collection universelle.

The Grande Bibliothèque's collection consists of some 4 million works, including 1.14 million books, 1.2 million other documents, and 1.66 million microfiches. The majority of the works are in French; about 30% are in English, and a dozen other languages are also represented. The library has some 80 kilometres of shelf space.

These works are divided into two collections. The Collection nationale or Québec heritage collection, with about one million works, consists of copies of all works given to the BNQ for legal deposit, that is every book published in the province since 1968 as well as some 35,000 books published elsewhere that are pertaining to the subject of Quebec or whose at least one co-author is originally from the province. Documents by or about French Canadians, French Americans or Aboriginal peoples of the province are also included in this last number. This is supplemented by the Saint-Sulpice collection of some 78,000 works, some dating back to the 1760s and including books from the personal libraries of such figures as Louis-Joseph Papineau and Louis-Hippolyte Lafontaine. The Collection nationale is available for on-site reference.

The Collection universelle de prêt et de référence, a collection of about three million works on all subjects, includes the collection of the Bibliothèque centrale de Montréal, purchased from the City of Montreal for the project, as well as new acquisitions. Except for reference works, these works are available for loan. Written works are catalogued by the Dewey Decimal System.

Besides written works, there is also a large multimedia collection including 70,000 music CDs, 5,000 music scores, 16,000 films on DVD and Blu-ray, and 500 software programs, available for loan. The library's adapted book service holds more than 50,000 documents for the visually impaired, including Braille and audiobooks.

== Services ==
The library has 1300 reading armchairs, 850 study seats and carrels, and 350 computer stations.

The basement contains a children's library with special audio-visual equipment, the Espace jeunes.

Its extensive multimedia facilities include 44 audio stations and 50 video stations, as well as multimedia computer terminals and two music rooms with facilities for composing electronic music.

Other specialized services include a job and career centre, a business connection centre, a special service centre for newcomers to Québec, and a language laboratory.

In addition to its collections, reading rooms, and audio-visual facilities, the Grande Bibliothèque also contains exhibition spaces, conference rooms, theatres, and auditoriums.

== Building ==
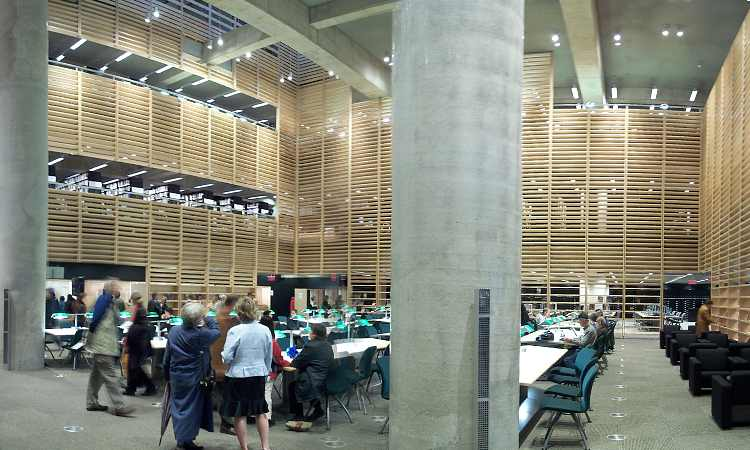
The reading room of Bibliothèque et Archives nationales du Québec's Collection nationale.

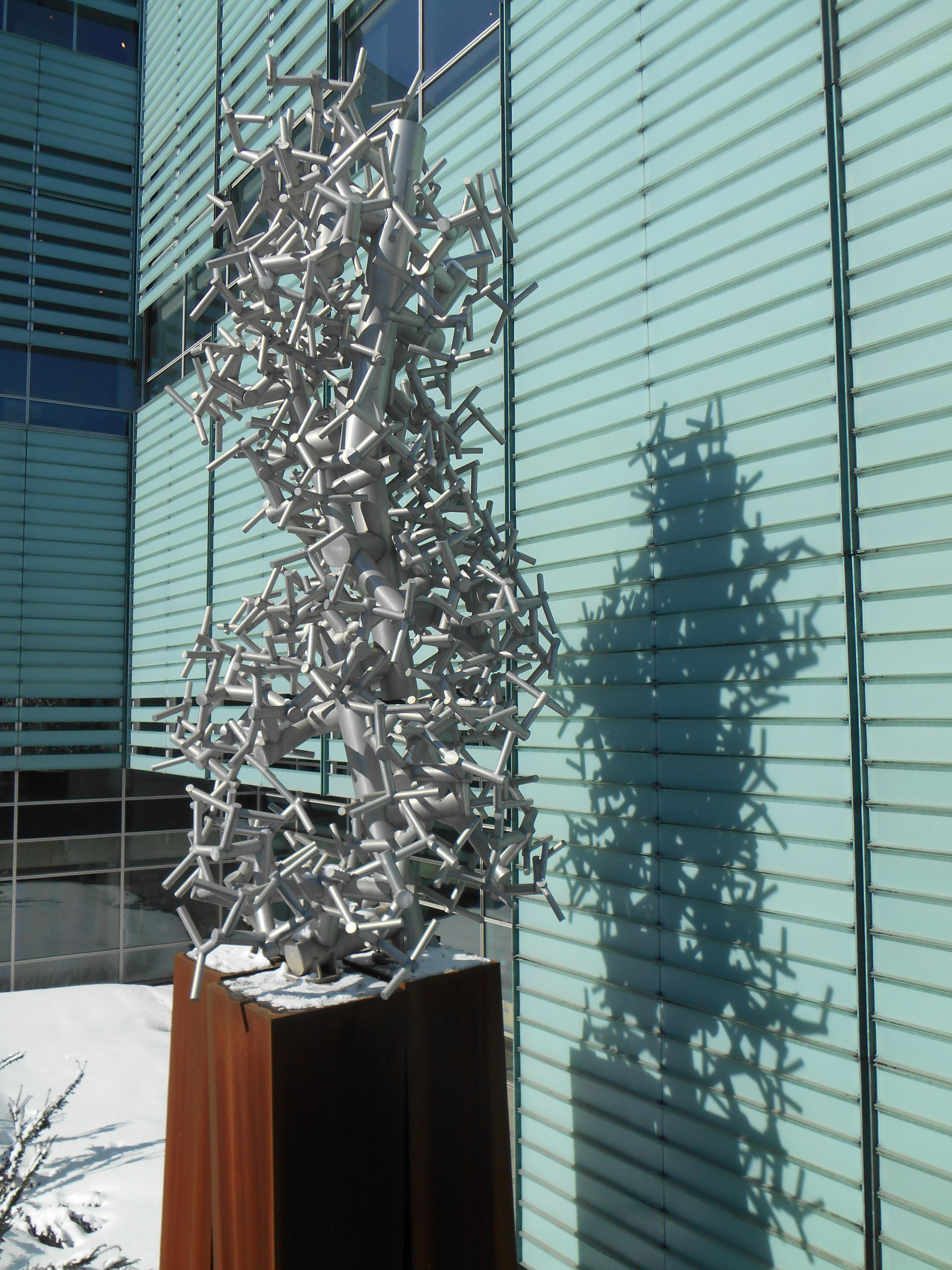
Espace fractal by Jean-Pierre Morin.

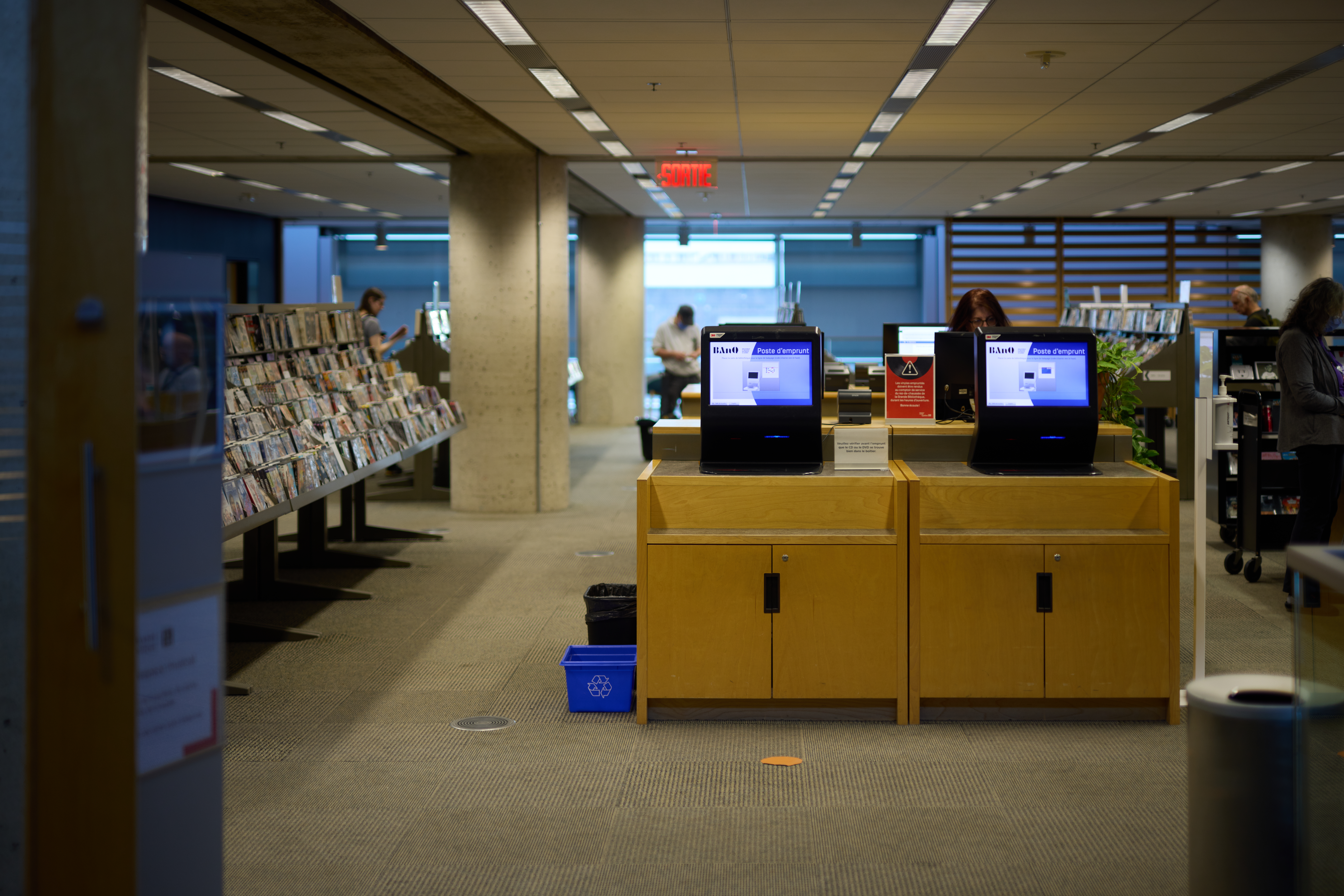
Borrowing machines at the library

The Grande Bibliothèque, which had been a pet project of former Québec premier Lucien Bouchard, was designed by Patkau Architects from Vancouver and Croft-Pelletier/Gilles Guité from Quebec City.

Construction on the new 33,000 m^{2} library, a $90.6 million project began in 2001 on the site of the former Palais du commerce. It was officially opened 23 April 2005 in time for the World Book and Copyright Day, during a year in which Montréal held the honorary title of World Book Capital given by UNESCO. The library was opened to the general public the following Saturday, April 30, 2005, and loans began on May 3.

The contemporary-styled five-storey building is clad with U-shaped plates of glass of a type never used before in North America, placed horizontally on the copper uprights that run the whole height of the building.

In June 2005 three of these plates of glass shattered. In the first three weeks of July 2005, three more of these plates shattered, an average of one breakage per week. Metal barricades and canopies were used to secure the areas until the problem was corrected.

The national and universal collections are each housed in one of two chambres de bois ("wooden rooms"), a reference to Anne Hébert's novel Les Chambres de bois. These multi-storey areas are demarcated by walls of wooden slats, either allowing indirect natural light or blocking it according to the conservation needs of the collection. The slats are made of Québec-grown yellow birch, the official tree of Québec.

In accordance with the Québec government's policy on integrating art and architecture, the building contains several integrated works of art:

- an exterior sculpture, Espace fractal, by Jean-Pierre Morin;
- a glass mural on the Rue Savoie façade, Vous êtes ici, by Dominique Blain;
- a kinetic luminous mural at Metro level, Voix sans bruit, by Louise Viger;
- a sculpture garden to the north of the building, divided into plots of which one will be developed with sculpture and landscape art each year; currently containing Jardin punk and Jardin de la forêt urbaine by Roger Gaudreau.

The Grande Bibliothèque is located at 475 De Maisonneuve Boulevard East (45°30′56.00″N 73°33′45.00″W) at the corner of Berri Street, in the Quartier Latin adjacent to the Université du Québec à Montréal campus, in the borough of Ville-Marie. It is connected directly by the underground city to Berri–UQAM station, a factor cited by the institution for its success.

== See also ==
- Bibliothèque et Archives nationales du Québec
- Bibliothèque de Montréal
- List of national libraries
- Literature of Quebec
