= Dominique Blain =

Canadian painter (born 1957)

Dominique Blain (French pronunciation: [dɔminik blɛ̃]; born June 22, 1957) is a Canadian artist living and working in Montreal, Quebec. Her work incorporates photography, installation and sculpture. She explores political themes in her art such as war, racism and slavery. Her body of work speaks to universal topics close to human fate.

== Early life ==
Blain was born in Montreal, Quebec, and studied art at Concordia University. She relocated to Los Angeles during the late 1980s but came back to Quebec in 1992. In 1996, she graduated from the New York Film Academy.

== Exhibitions ==
Her work has been shown in venues such as the Portland Museum of Art, the Los Angeles County Museum of Art, the Frankfurter Kunstverein, the Stedelijk Museum Amsterdam, the Louisiana Museum of Modern Art in Denmark, the Musée de l’Europe in Brussels and the Museum of Science and Industry in Manchester. Major retrospectives of her work were held: in several cities in Great Britain in 1997-98 by the Arnolfini centre in Bristol (1997-1998); in Quebec City, San Francisco and Rome by the Musée national des beaux-arts du Québec in 1998; and in Montreal, Regina and Calgary by the Musée d'art contemporain de Montréal in 2004. She participated in the Biennale of Sydney in 1992. In Québec, she also participated in three editions of Les Cent jours d’art contemporain and exhibited her work at Galerie de l’UQAM, University of Sherbrooke art gallery, Musée régional de Rimouski and Musée d’art de Joliette. In 2022, Dominique Blain: Dérive/Drift was shown at the Image Centre, Toronto.

== Public art ==
Blain has created and installed public art at the headquarters of the Canadian Broadcasting Corporation in Toronto (1994), at the Grande Bibliothèque in Montreal (2005), at the Jardins de Métis in Grand-Métis (2007), at the Jewish General Hospital in Montreal (2008), at the Hôpital du Sacré-Cœur de Montréal (2009), and at the Théâtre du Nouveau Monde (2011).

== Awards ==
Blain received the Prix Paul-Émile-Borduas in 2014 and the Les Elles de l’Art Award in 2009. In 2024, she received the Governor General's Awards in Visual and Media Arts.

== Selected collections ==
Her art is included in the collections of the National Gallery of Canada, the Scottsdale Museum of Contemporary Art, the Musée national des beaux-arts du Québec the Montreal Museum of Fine Arts and the Robert McLaughlin Gallery.
