= Marie-Chantal Croft =

Canadian architect

Marie-Chantal Croft (born c. 1969) is an architect in Quebec, Canada. She teaches architectural design at the School of Architecture of Laval University.

== Biography ==
She graduated from Laval University in 1992. She was a co-founder of the firm "Croft Pelletier" architectes. In 1995 together with Patkau Architects, "Croft Pelletier" architectes designed the Grande Bibliothèque in Montreal. The firm also won the competition to design a major expansion to the bibliothèque de Charlesbourg in Quebec City and received the Henry Adams Certificate of the American Institute of Architecture.

== Awards ==
Croft has received the Ronald J. Thom Award from the Canada Council for the Arts, the Médaille Raymond-Blais and the Prix Marcel-Parizeau from the Ordre des architectes du Québec.
