= Prix Paul-Émile-Borduas =

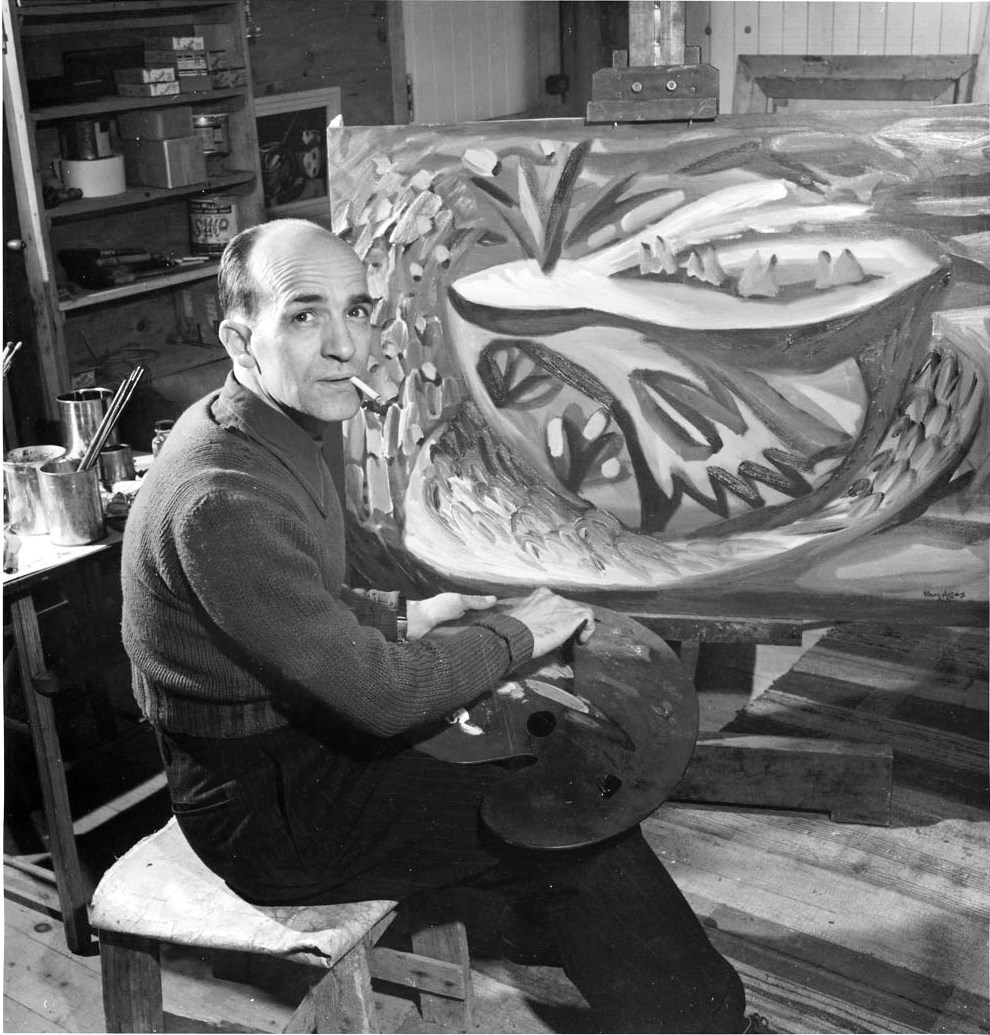
- Paul-Émile Borduas in his studio, 1946
- Description: Highest distinction for artists in visual arts, craft, architecture, and design in Quebec
- Country: Canada (Quebec)
- Presented by: Government of Quebec
- Website: https://prixduquebec.gouv.qc.ca/prix/culturels/paul-emile-borduas/

The Prix Paul-Émile-Borduas is an award by the Government of Quebec that is part of the Prix du Québec, given to individuals who are artists or craftsman in the fields of visual arts, of the trades of art, architecture and the design. It is named in honour of Paul-Émile Borduas.

The Prix Paul-Émile-Borduas was established in 1977 as one of the Prix du Québec, a series of awards created that year to recognized outstanding careers and contributions in the cultural and scientific fields in Quebec.

The award recognizes an individual's outstanding contribution to the devolepment of visual arts, crafts or digital arts in Quebec.

The disciplines recognized in the field of the trades of art are those which refer to the transformation wood, leather, textiles, metals, silicates or of any other matter.

The recipient receives a non-tawable grant of C$30,000, a silver medal engraved with their name, a calligraphed certificate signed by the Premier of Quebec and the responsible minister, and a silver-plated gold lapel pin.

== Winners ==
Year	Recipient	Year	Recipient
1977	Léon Bellefleur	2002	Jocelyne Alloucherie
1978	Ulysse Comtois	2003	Raymonde April
1979	Julien Hébert	2004	Maurice Savoie
1980	Guido Molinari	2005	Micheline Beauchemin
1981	Jean-Paul Riopelle	2006	Angela Grauerholz
1982	Roland Giguère	2007	Rober Racine
1983	Marcelle Ferron	2008	Denis Juneau
1984	Alfred Pellan	2009	Gabor Szilasi
1985	Charles Daudelin	2010	William Vazan
1986	Betty Goodwin	2011	Gilles Mihalcean
1987	Françoise Sullivan	2012	John Heward
1988	Fernand Leduc	2013	Marcel Barbeau
1989	Claude Tousignant	2014	Dominique Blain
1990	Michel Goulet	2015	Cozic
1991	Michel Dallaire	2016	Rita Letendre
1992	Dan S. Hanganu	2017	Jana Sterbak
1993	Armand Vaillancourt	2018	Geneviève Cadieux
1994	Henry Saxe	2019	Luc Courchesne
1995	Charles Gagnon	2020	Pierre Bourgault
1996	Melvin Charney	2021	André Fournelle
1997	Irene F. Whittome	2022	Barbara Steinman
1998	Jean McEwen	2023	Evergon
1999	René Derouin	2024	François Morelli
2000	Jacques Hurtubise	2025	Nadia Myre
2001	Roland Poulin		
