= René Derouin =

Canadian artist (born 1936

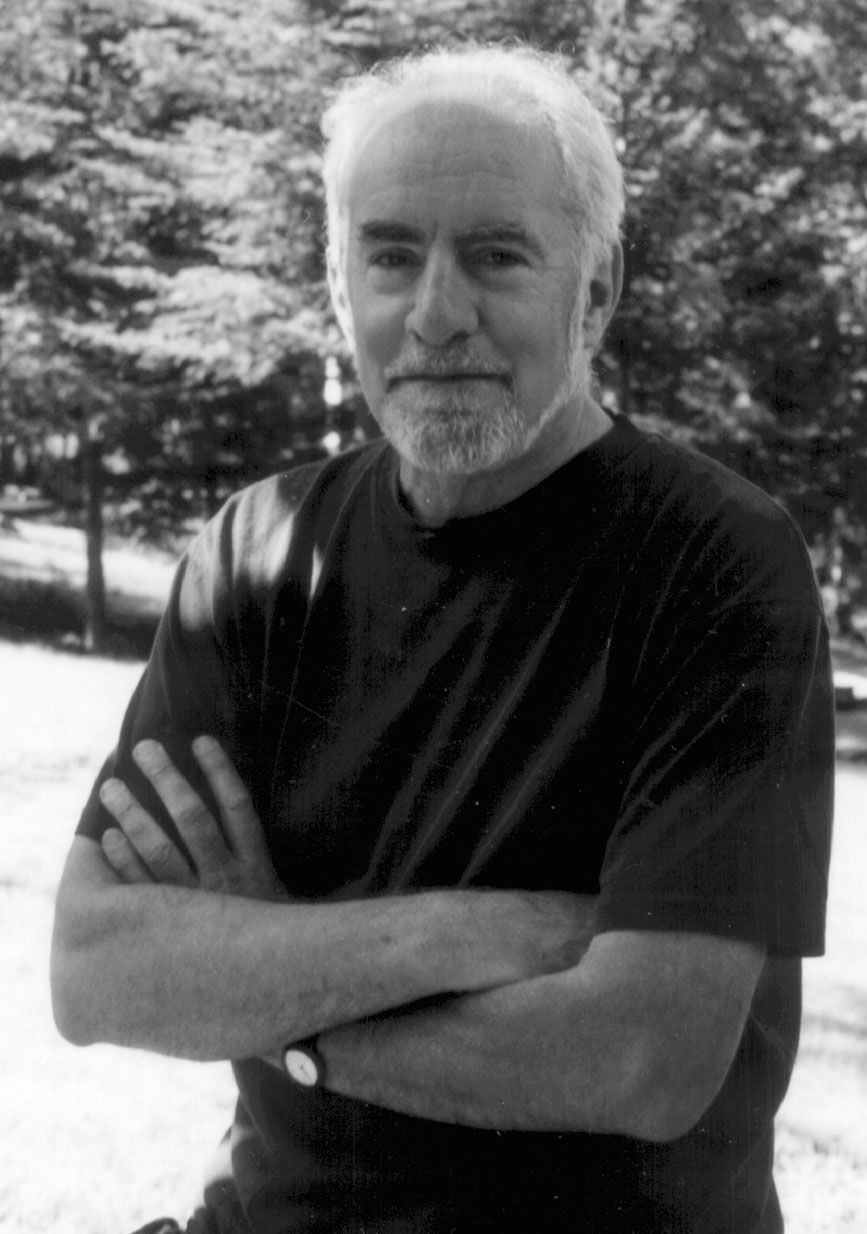
- Derouine in 2012
- Born: April 28, 1936 (age 89); Montreal, Quebec, Canada
- Known for: Printmaking, drawing, sculpture, installation
- Awards: Order of Canada 2011; Order of the Aztec Eagle 2006; Prix Paul-Émile-Borduas 1999

René Derouin CM CQ (born April 28, 1936) is a Canadian multidisciplinary artist, known for revitalizing the print medium.

== Career ==
Since he was a student in the 1950s, René Derouin has spent time in Mexico as well as Quebec. The Americas, Mexico's archaeological sites and the murals of José Clemente Orozco, Diego Rivera, and David Alfaro Siqueiros have made an indelible impression on him. A major theme of Derouin's art is identity which he expresses through printmaking, drawing, sculpture, and installation.

Travels to the Northern Quebec territories in the 1970s led Derouin to turn his attention to the concept of "the north". In search of his roots, he also examined the concept of being American. Created after a stay in James Bay in 1979, Nordic Suite – a large print made after Derouin had a helicopter view of the territory is composed of six sheets plus their printing blocks resting on the floor. The prints refer in their imagery to the changes wrote by the processes of time. Nordic Suite began a series that highlighted the interrelationship of print and block by displaying them together, which contributed to a rethinking of printmaking in Québec. The extremely large format, reminiscent of the Mexican muralists, and the overhead viewpoint, were also influential on the genre.

Not long after, Derouin thought of a print that would develop the idea further using as an idea the geographic map which unfolded, revealed a global view. He made prints into lengthy murals (1979–1980), which with their stylized forms taken from the northern peat bogs, referred to the northern territory and to his own past and influences.

The largest of his installations so far has been Migrations, conceived for the Museo Rufino Tamayo de Arte Contemporáneo Internacional in Mexico City and exhibited there as well as at the Musée national des beaux-arts du Québec, Québec City in 1992. It consisted of 150 printing blocks assembled on the floor to cover a huge space, 50 metres in length, populated by 20,000 terracotta figurines handmade by the artist (he destroyed 19,000 of them later). Derouin meant to recall through creating it the crowds in Mexico's large public squares as well as the migrations of peoples that have occurred throughout history.

In 1998, a travelling retrospective of his work titled René Derouin: Frontiers, Frontières, Frontieras, 1995-1998, was organized by Patricia Ainslie for the Glenbow Museum in Calgary, Alberta. Another retrospective occurred in 2003 featuring the work owned by Derouin collectors in the Laurentians by Centre Culturel de Val-David. Derouin has had many exhibitions of his work, not only in Canada, the United States and Mexico, but further abroad. His works are in many public collections such as the National Gallery of Canada, the Musée national des beaux-arts du Québec, and many other museum collections.

In 1975, René Derouin settled in a home-workshop he had built in Val-David in the Laurentians. In 1996, he created the Derouin Foundation which has organized major international art symposiums in the Jardins du Précambrien in Val-David.

René Derouin's contributions to culture have earned him many awards and honours, including the Order of Canada (2011), the Mexican Order of the Aztec Eagle (2006), as well as Québec's Prix Paul-Émile-Borduas (1999). His archival collection is in Bibliothèque et Archives Nationales du Québec (P922).
