= Raymonde April =

Canadian photographer

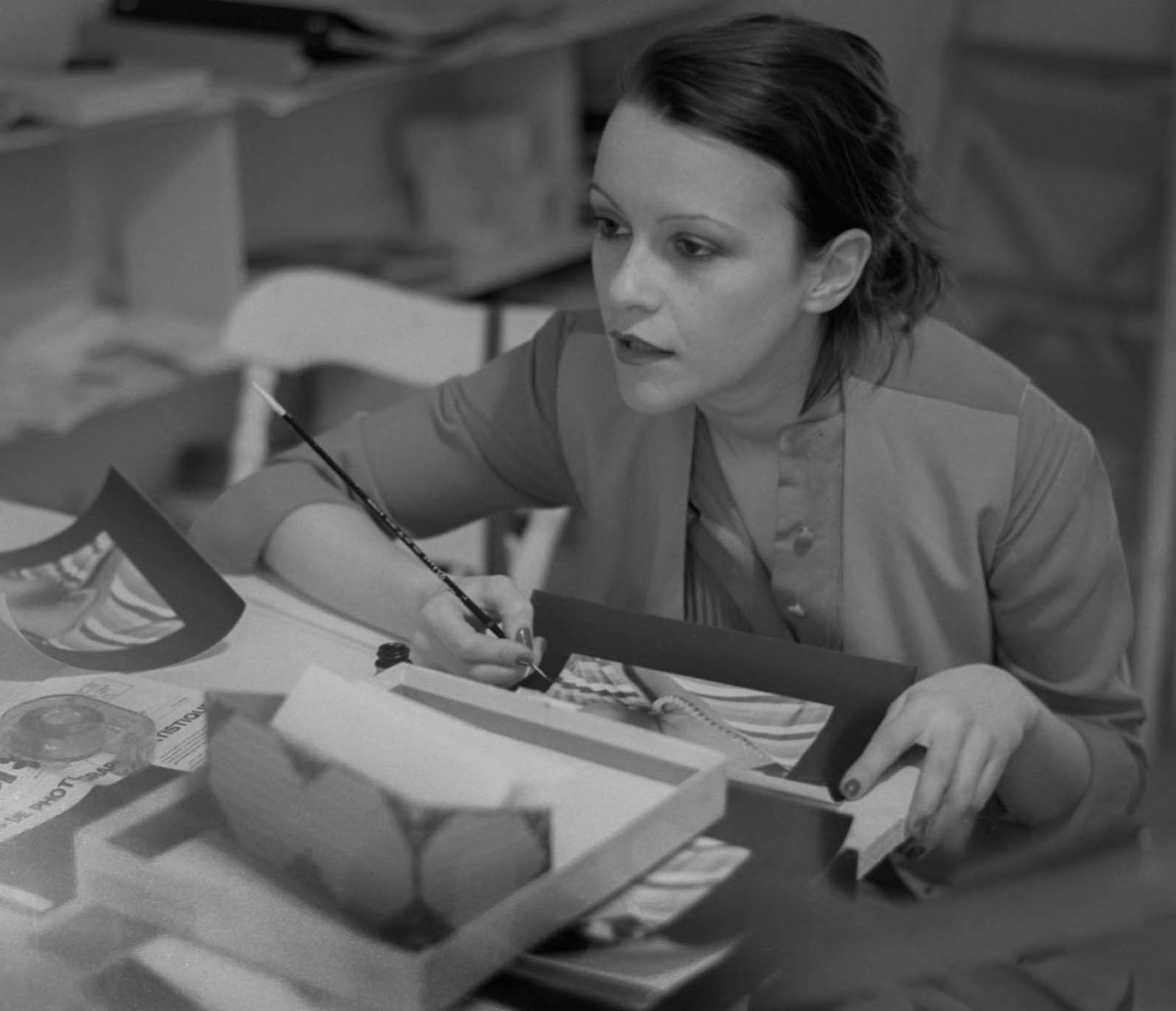
- Born: 23 June 1953 (age 72); Moncton, New Brunswick, Canada
- Occupation: Photographer/ chair of studio arts at concordia university/ teacher
- Known for: Contemporary artist and photographer
- Awards: Officer of the Order of Canada, Prix Paul-Émile-Borduas

Raymonde April OC (born 23 June 1953) is a Canadian contemporary artist, photographer and academic. April lives in Montreal where she teaches photography at Concordia University. Her work has been shown regularly in museums and galleries in Canada and Europe. Her photographs have also been featured in various publications and awarded the Prix du Québec.

== Life and work ==
April was born in Moncton, New Brunswick and raised in Rivière-du-Loup in Eastern Quebec. She studied at several universities, specifically for art. She attended the art college in Rivière-du-Loup and the École des arts visuels of the Université Laval, in Québec.

April is known for her photography and academics. She has been a photographer since the 1970s. She attended and taught photography at Condordia University since 1985. She also helped open La Chambre Blanche, a facility for artists in Québec.

April explores narrative through her photography. Her extensive series depict everyday life, transforming the average experiences into tremendous images. They include typical photographic tropes, like portraits and landscapes. Eduardo Ralickas argues April's work is articulated around a scene between near and far, appearance and disappearance, making distance a key factor in mapping the territory of the symbolic and the imaginary. Her work is in the permanent collection of the National Gallery of Canada and in many other collections.

== Exhibitions ==
In 1991, she had a solo show Raymonde April: embrace everything (presented as part of the Mois de la Photo à Montréal), at the Leonard & Bina Ellen Art Gallery, Concordia University. She had solo exhibitions as well at the Musée d'art contemporain de Montréal (1986), and the Musée d'art de Joliette (1997). She showed again at the Mois de la Photo à Montréal in 2011, this time her self-portraits. In 2022, Traversée (151 photographs by April), was shown at 1700 La Poste art center, Montreal.

== Awards ==
- 2003: Prix Paul-Émile-Borduas award.
- 2005: Paul de Hueck and Norman Walford Career Achievement Award for Art Photography from the Ontario Arts Foundation.
- 2010: Officer of the Order of Canada for having "made a significant contribution to the evolution of photography in Canada".
