= Jana Sterbak =

Czech-Canadian artist (born 1955)

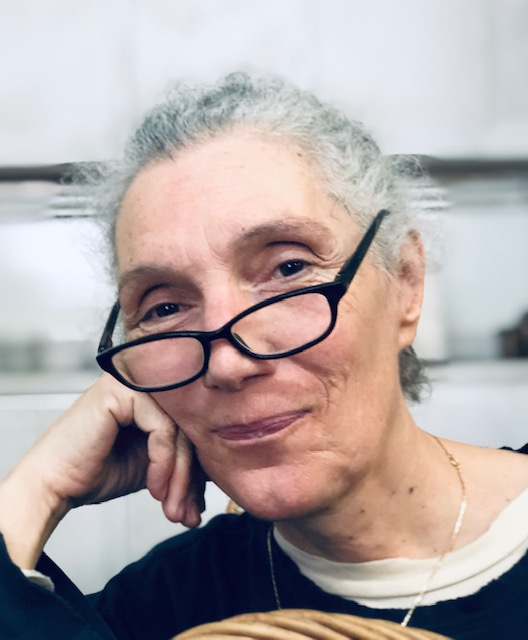
- Born: Jana Štěrbáková; 1955 (age 70–71); Prague, Czechoslovakia
- Education: Concordia University
- Awards: Guggenheim Fellowship (1991); Prix Ozias-Leduc (1995); Governor General's Awards in Visual and Media Arts (2012); Prix Paul-Émile-Borduas (2017)
- Website: janasterbak.com

Jana Sterbak (born Jana Štěrbáková in 1955) is a Czech-Canadian multidisciplinary artist.

== Life and career ==
Sterbak earned a Bachelor of Fine Arts at Concordia University in 1977, completing painting classes with Yves Gaucher and Guido Molinari. In the 1980s, she studied art history at the University of Toronto and at New York University, ultimately abandoning her studies to dedicate herself to her artistic practice. In her artistic approach, performance is incorporated into her photography, film, and video installations.

In the 1990s, Sterbak moved to Paris to teach at the École nationale supérieure des beaux-arts. In 1991, a retrospective of her work was held at the National Gallery of Canada and subsequently shown at the List Visual Arts Center in Boston (1991) and at the Museum of Contemporary Art San Diego (1992).

Her European career began in 1990 at Aperto, the international section of the Venice Biennale, where co-curator Bernard Blistène presented her work. Several solo shows followed: in 1992 at the Louisiana Museum of Modern Art (Denmark) the Museum of Modern Art (New York), where her installation Sisyphus was presented (this work then joined MAC Marseille's collection), and in 1993 at La Caixa Foundation (Barcelona). Velleitas, a solo exhibition curated by Corinne Diserens, was presented in 1995 at the Musée d'art moderne in Saint-Étienne and at the Fundació Antoni Tàpies in Barcelona, and at the Serpentine Gallery in London in 1996.

In the early 2000s, she produced two video installations. The first, From Here to there, represented Canada at the 2003 Venice Biennale; the second, Waiting for High Water, shot in Venice during the acqua alta phenomenon, was presented at the Prague Biennale in 2005. Waiting for High Water became her most exhibited video installation (with catalogue text by Hubert Damisch.)

In 2012, Sterbak, a Canadian citizen since her twentieth birthday, received a Governor General's Awards in Visual and Media Arts, and in 2017, she won the Prix Paul-Émile-Borduas (Quebec).

Her works have been called "as poetic as they are political. They are conceptually precise, interweaving the immediacy of specific materials with references to motifs from mythology, literature, and philosophy. Her materials are often ephemeral and transformative". Jana Sterbak's artwork is notable in terms of its form and function, often at odds with each other. Several of her pieces take the familiar shape of furniture or clothing, but the use of incongruous materials give the work an alternate meaning. Her materials range from permanent and restrictive metal and wire to the organic foodstuffs that decompose.

In a 1989 newspaper article titled "Art that is absolutely shocking", author Brian Volke of the Regina Leader-Post writes: "The works can be grouped into two general categories, furniture and dresses, both of which are usually considered part of the feminine domain. Both furniture – specifically beds and couches – and women symbolize similar things: rest, relaxation, care and pleasure. And both have been treated as commodities. Sterbak attacks these associations." The article cites specific installation pieces including "Seduction Couch", "Attitudes", "I Want You To Feel the Way I Do… (The Dress)", and "Vanitas: Flesh Dress for an Albino Anorectic".

In 1992, Sterbak created "Catacombs," in which bones have been cast from chocolate, creating an edible and incomplete human skeleton. In 1997, Sterbak's creations of a "bread bed" and "cake stool" played with symbols of livelihood. The comfort of an armchair takes on a morbid quality in "Chair Apollinaire," (1996), made from raw meat. Artworks such as these attempt to cause the viewer to question the value placed on food and life as fleeting and precious.

== Awards ==
- 1991: Guggenheim Fellowship
- 1993: Victor Martyn Lynch-Staunton Award
- 1994: Musée d'art moderne Prix Guichard
- 1995: Prix Ozias-Leduc
- 2012: Governor General's Awards in Visual and Media Arts
- 2017: Prix Paul-Émile-Borduas
