= Gilles Hocquart Building =

Historic building in Montreal

Coordinates: 45.513338°N 73.555112°W

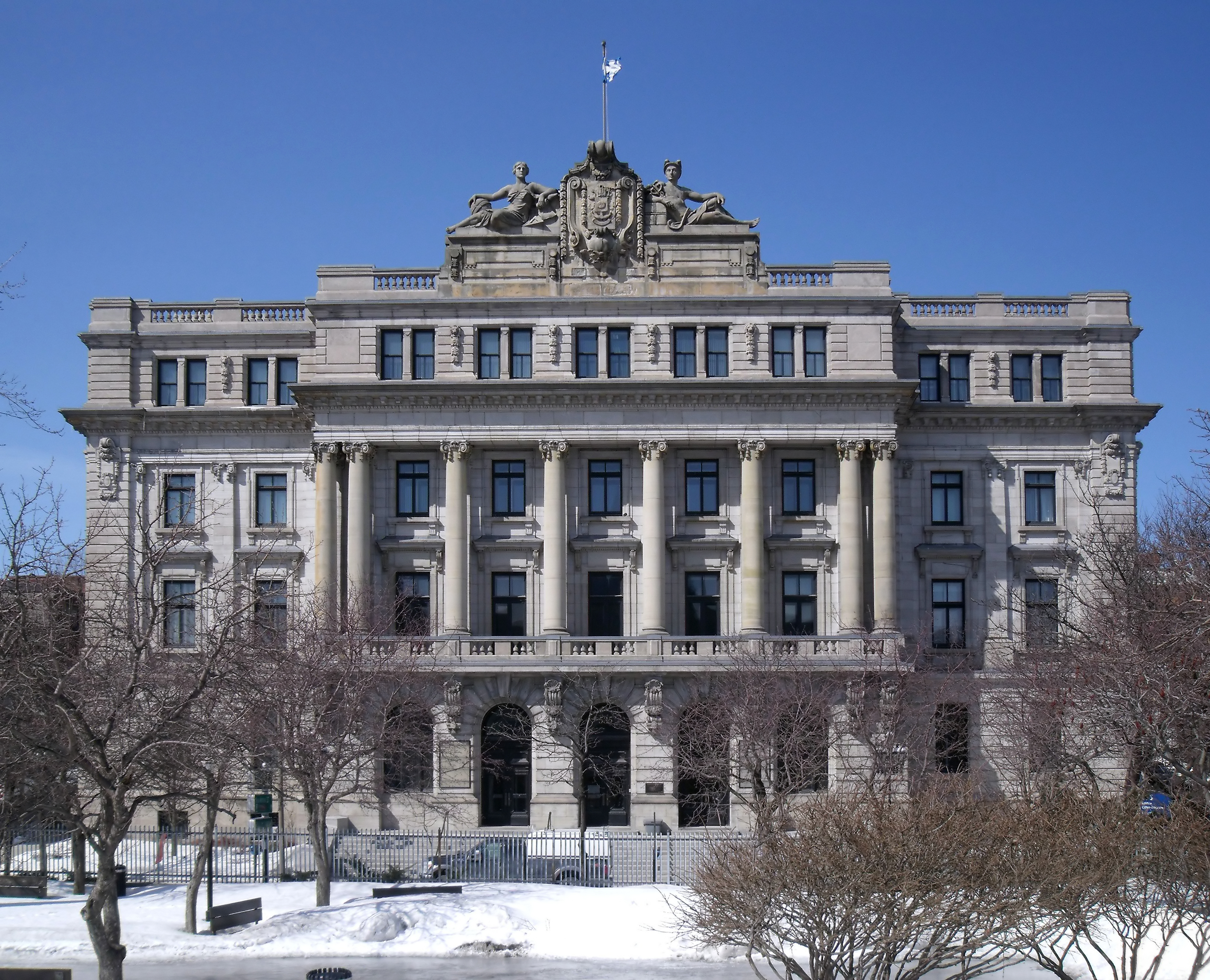
Gilles Hocquart building

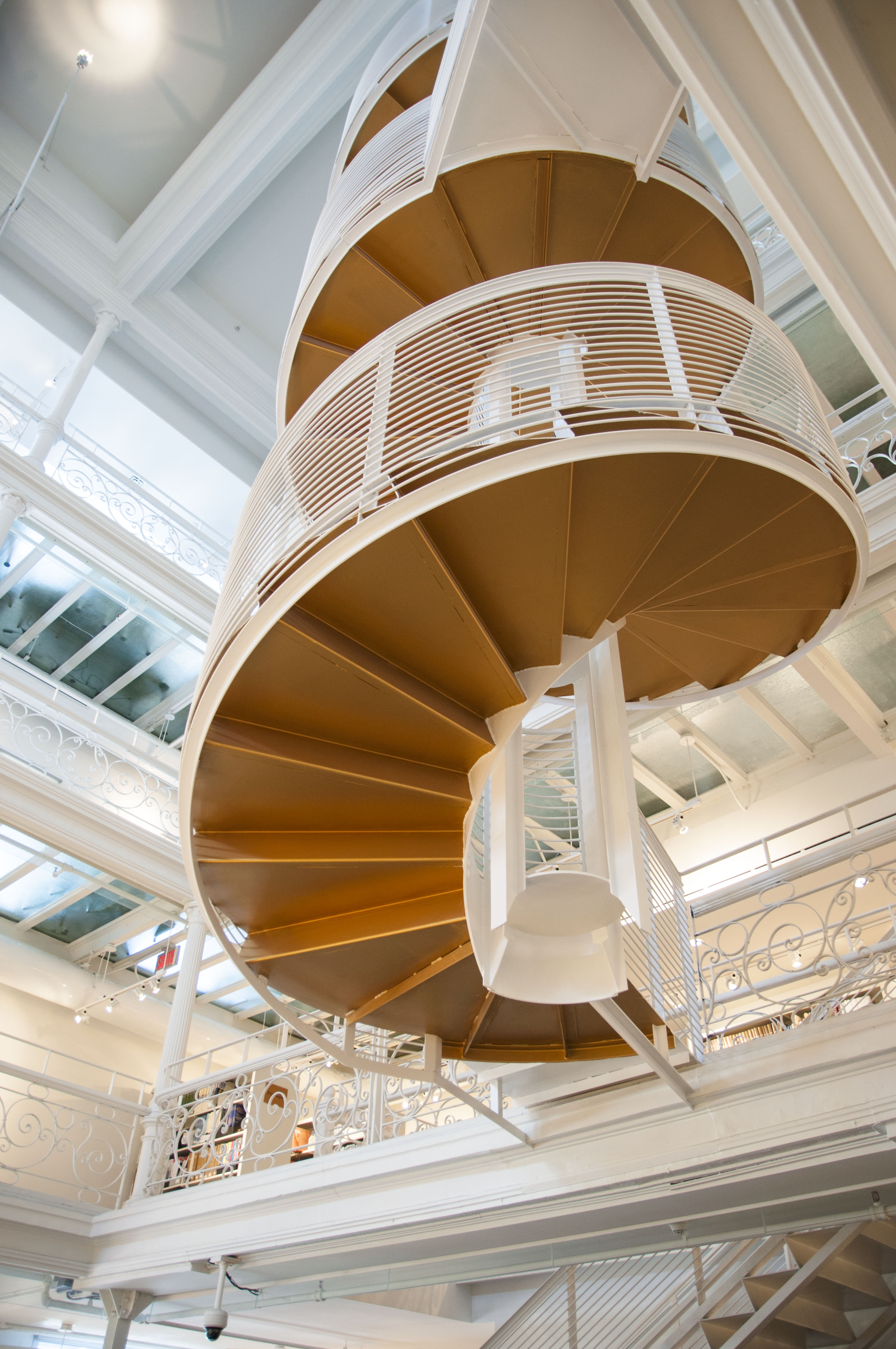
Interior

The Gilles Hocquart building is at 535 Viger Avenue East in the Quartier Latin of Montreal, Quebec, Canada.

This building was named in honor of Gilles Hocquart, fourteenth Intendant of New France who played an important role in safeguarding the documents concerning the French regime of New France. It is distinguished by its imposing presence in Viger Square, a prestigious setting for the French-speaking bourgeoisie in the early twentieth century,

== History ==
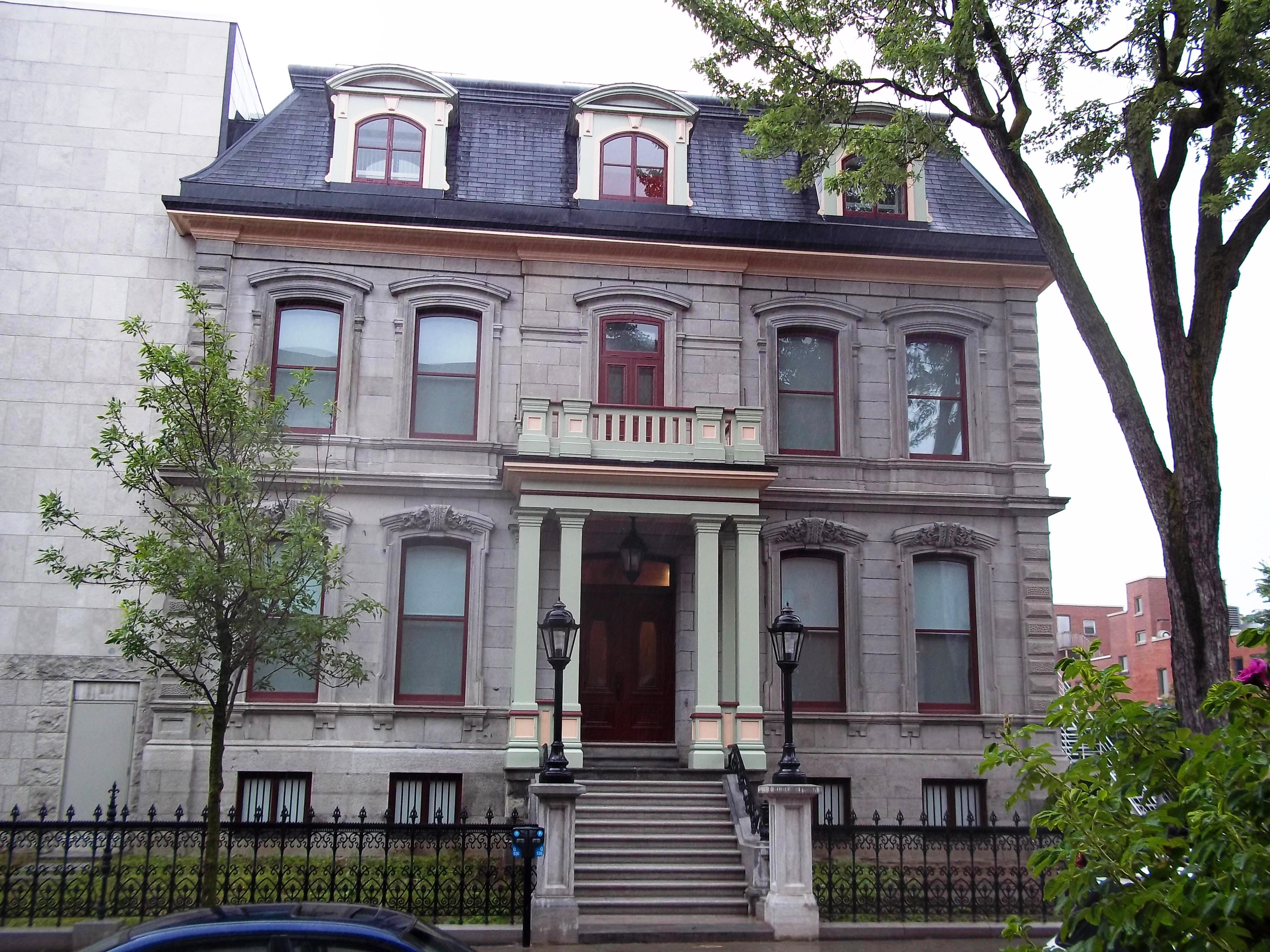
Marie-Hélène-Jodoin House

The Gilles Hocquart building actually comprises three distinct parts built at different times. These three buildings are first, Jodoin House, built in 1871, then the former École des Hautes Etudes Commerciales (HEC) in Montreal built in 1910 and a modern annex.

This building was built at the time in order to accommodate the HEC school. The construction was based on plans by architect Louis-Zéphirin Gauthier of the Gauthier & Daoust agency. The Gilles Hocquart building was owned by the HEC until 1970.

The building was later occupied by the Dawson College until 1988 and then by various departments and agencies. The Gilles Hocquart building is now owned by Société Immobilière du Québec (SIQ) and houses the Centre d'archives nationales in Montreal after several moves. Now called "BAnQ Vieux-Montréal", when the institution moved into the Gilles Hocquart building, some changes were made to meet the needs of an archive center. These changes were made to the plans of the architect Dan Hanganu.
