= Gilles Mihalcean =

Canadian sculptor

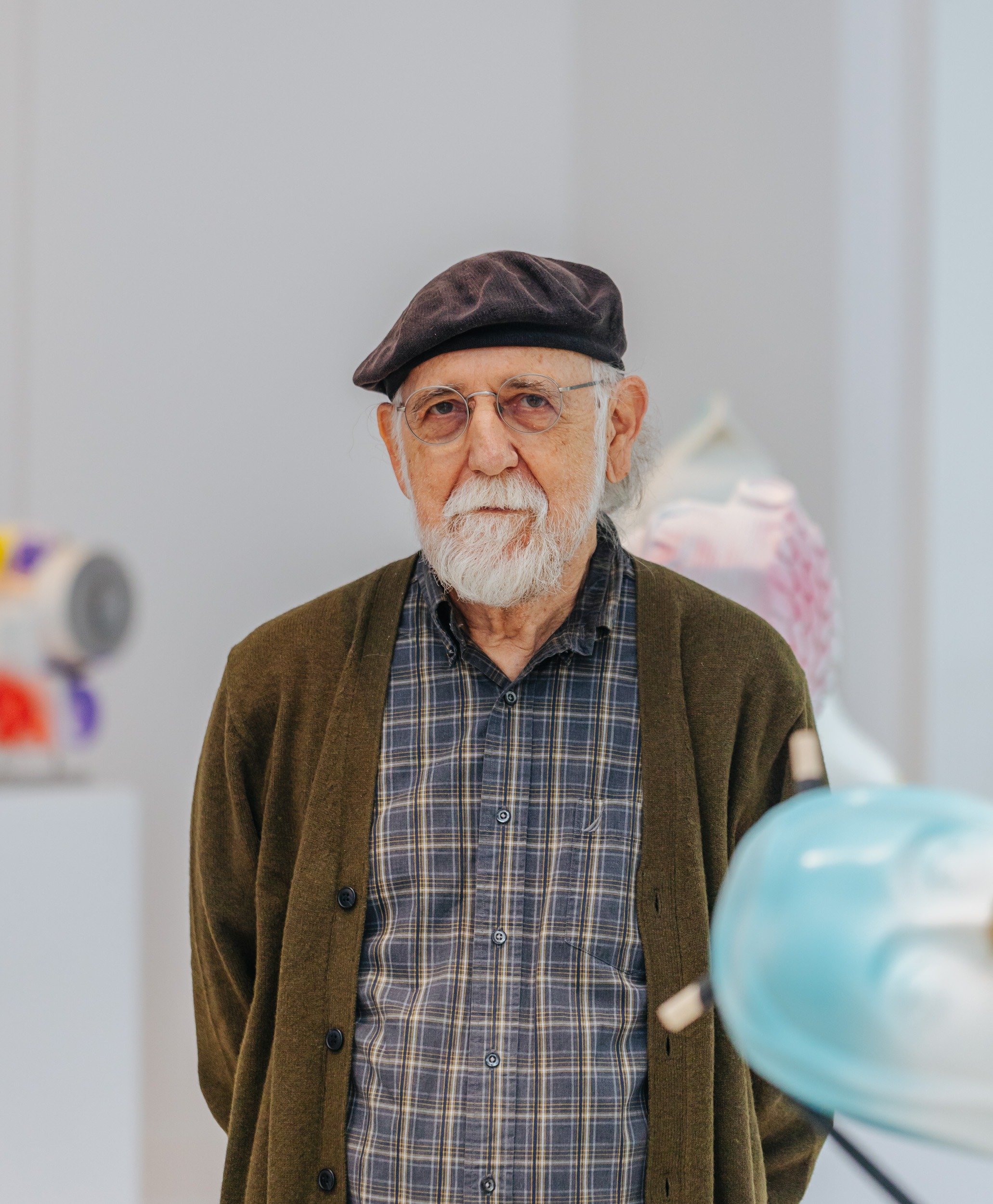
- Mihalcean in 2021
- Born: 18 April 1946 (age 80); Montreal, Quebec, Canada
- Occupation: Sculptor
- Years active: 1969–present

Gilles Mihălcean (born 18 April 1946) is a Canadian sculptor of Romanian descent living and working in Montréal. Over the years, his works have been exhibited in Canada, the United States and Europe.

== Biography ==
A self-taught sculptor, Mihalcean began his career in 1969. After teaching at Université Laval from 1972 to 1979, he devoted himself entirely to sculpting. He also worked as a lecturer at the Université de Montréal and the University of Ottawa. He rose to prominence in the 1980s, with major exhibits at the Musée d'art contemporain de Montréal and the Power Plant in Toronto, as well as commercial galleries such as Galerie René Blouin, Chantal Boulanger, Roger Bellemare and Circa.

== Works ==
- Révélation
- Révolution
- Trou de ver
- Portrait (entre deux chaises)
- La Maison
- Le Livre
- Vieille Branche
- Brumes gaspésiennes
- Nº 1, Lundi
- La Ballade

== Gallery ==
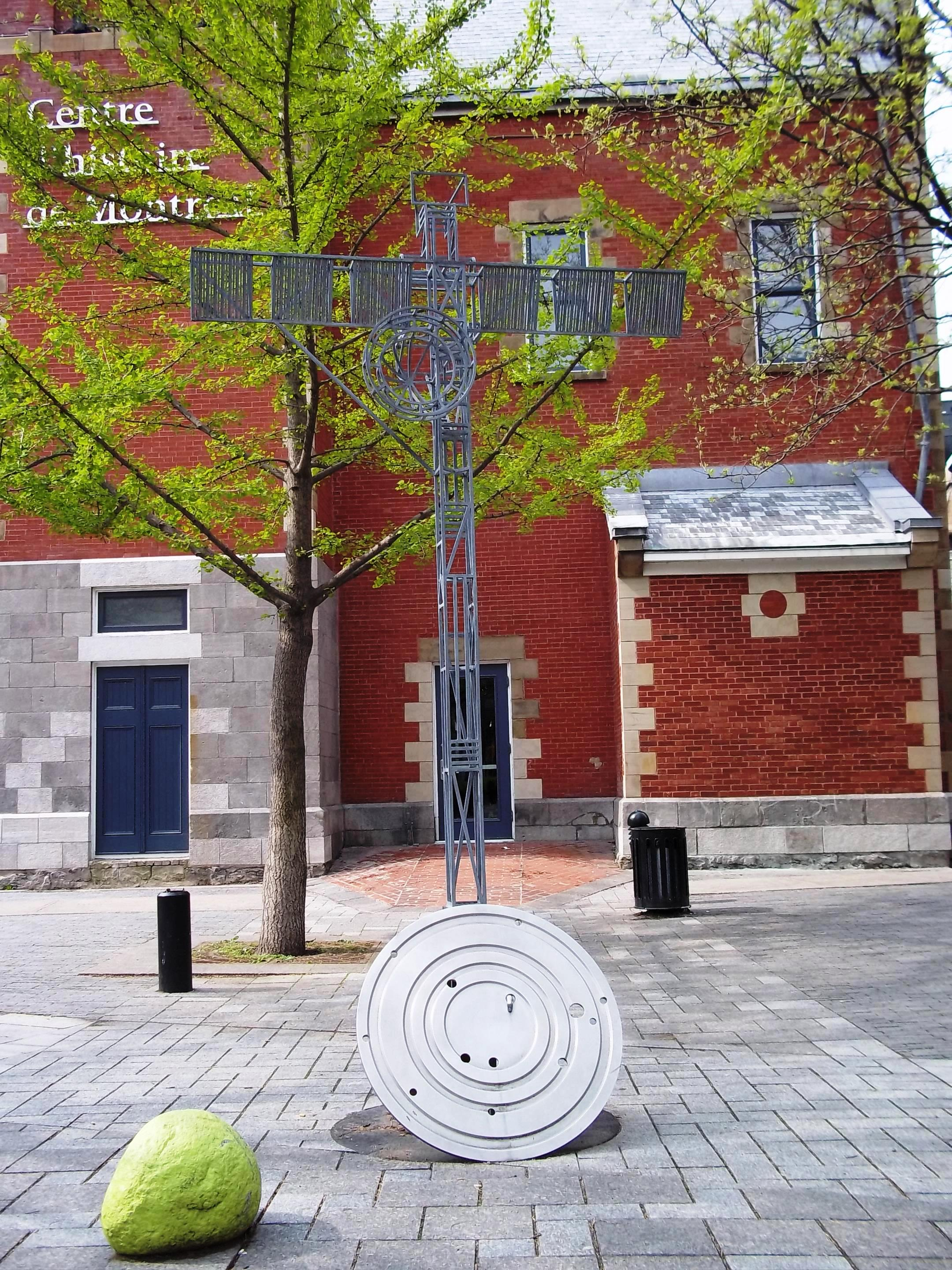
La Peur (1993)

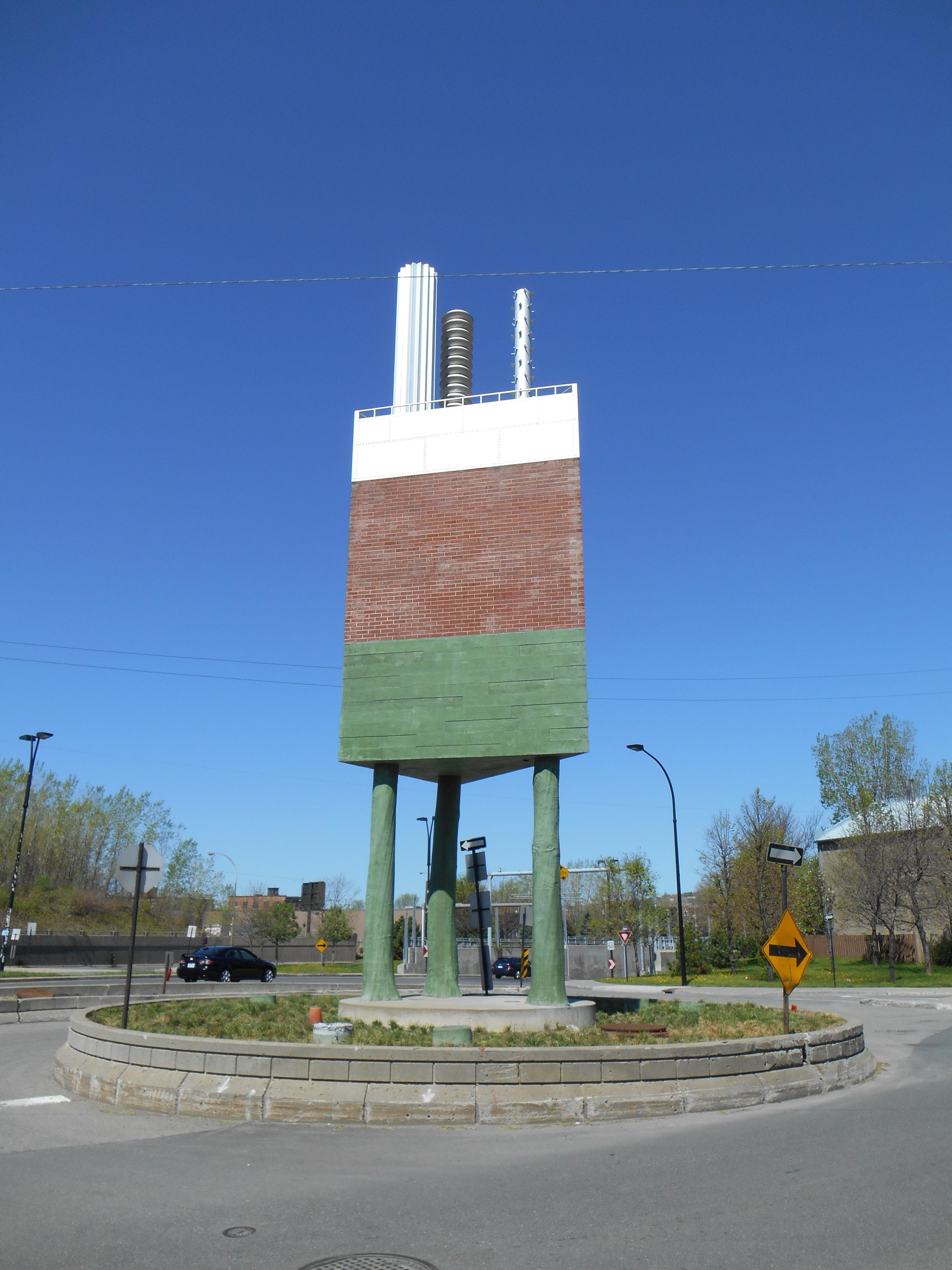
Monument à la Pointe

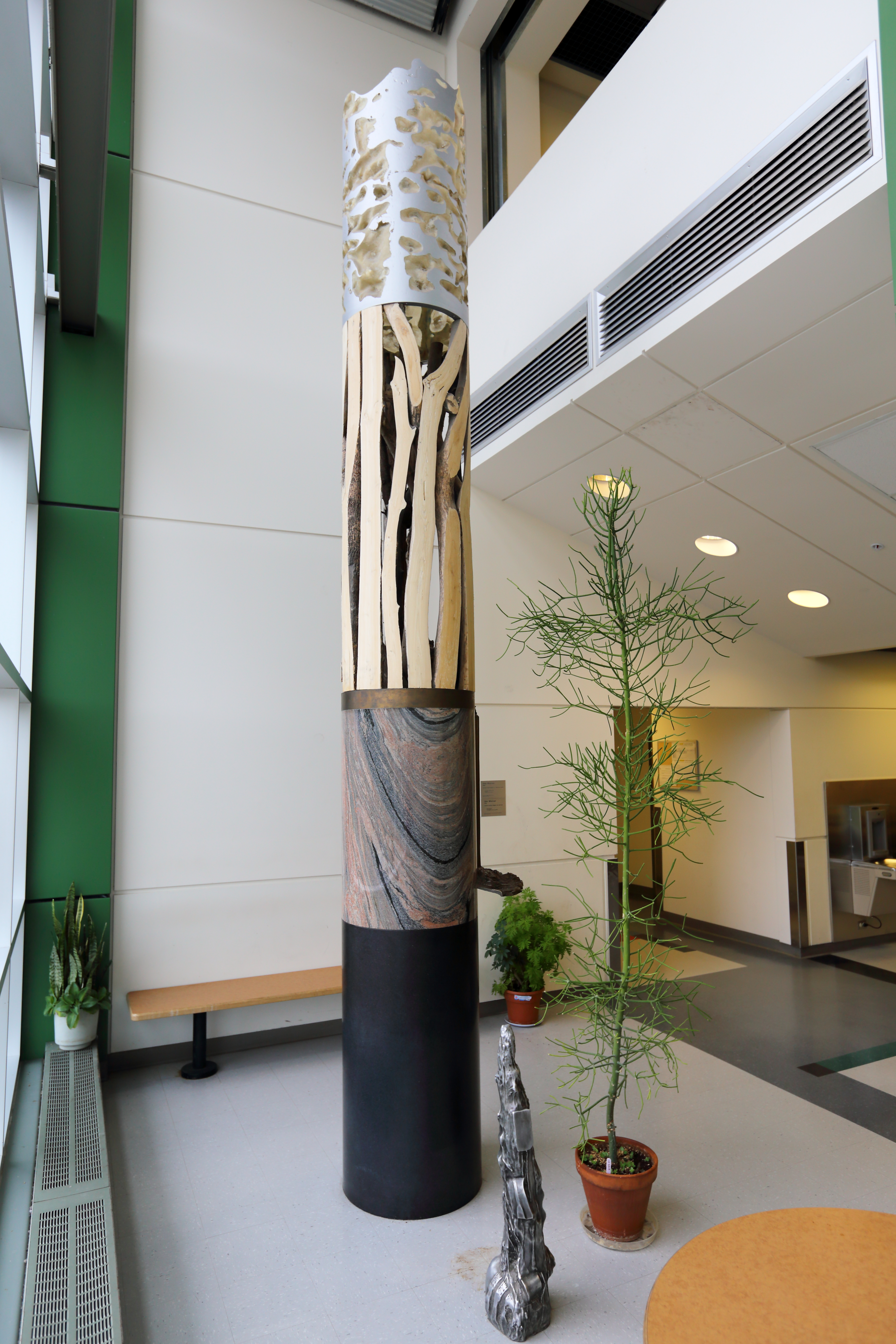
Colonne-carotte

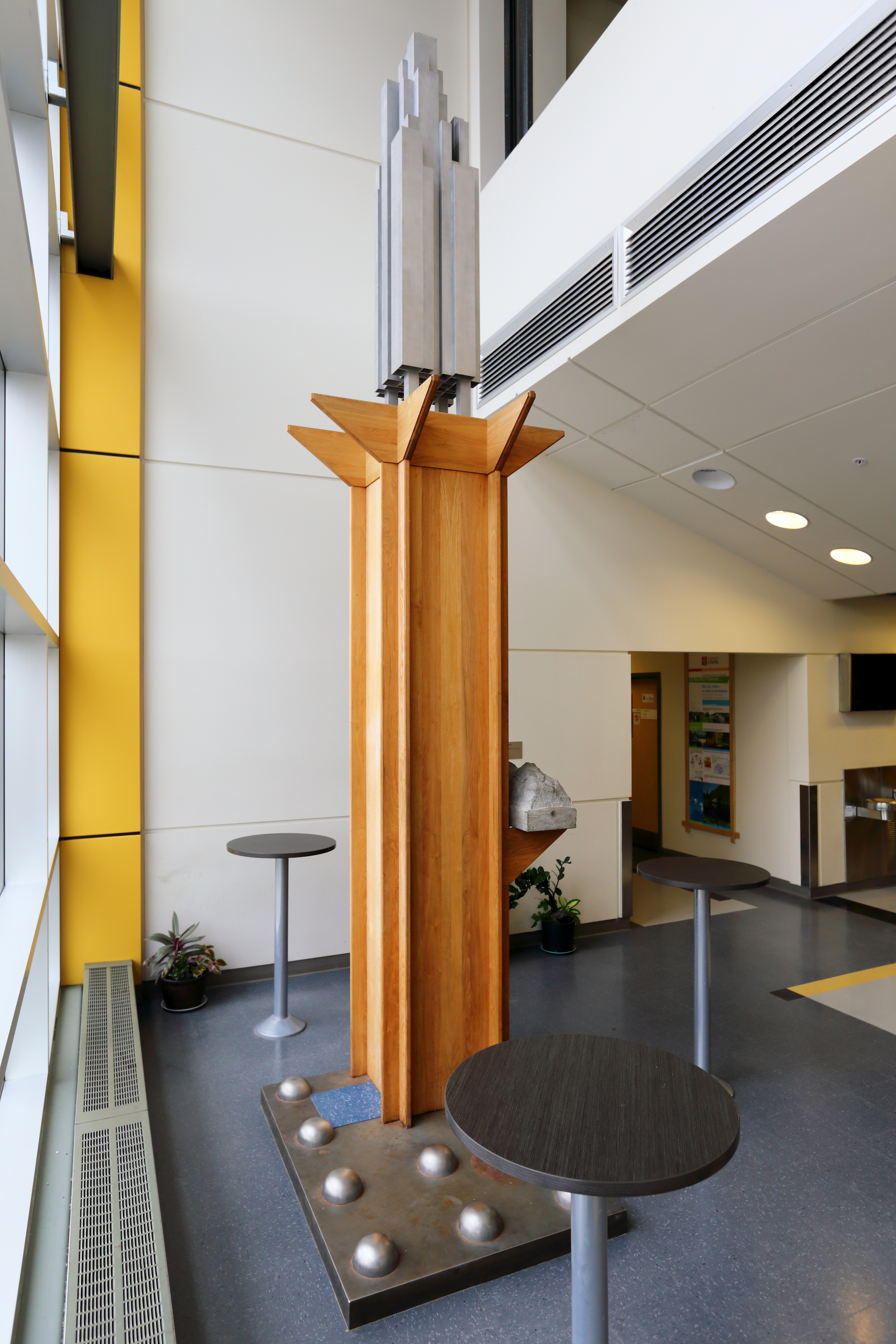
Colonne-cité

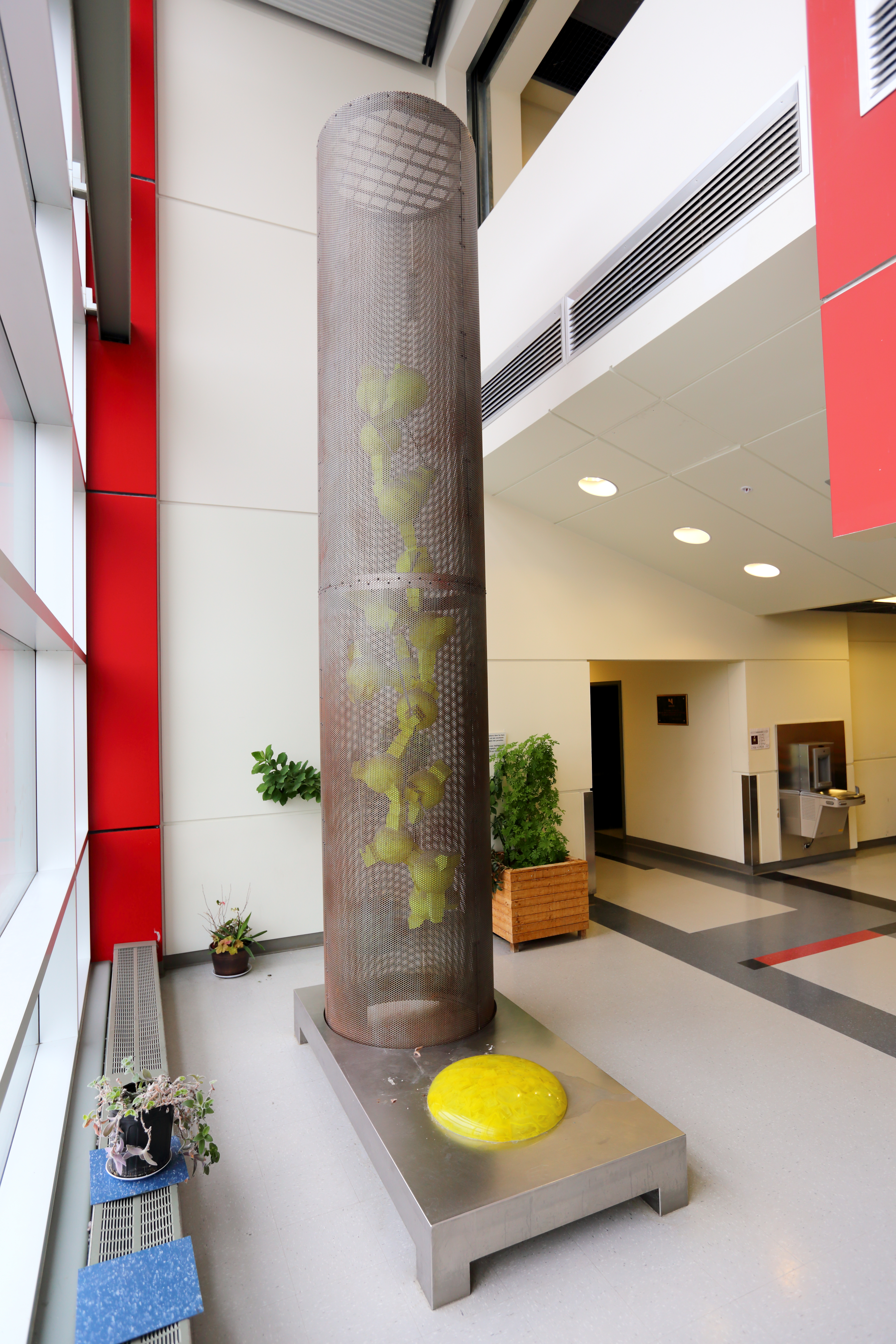
Colonne-fluide

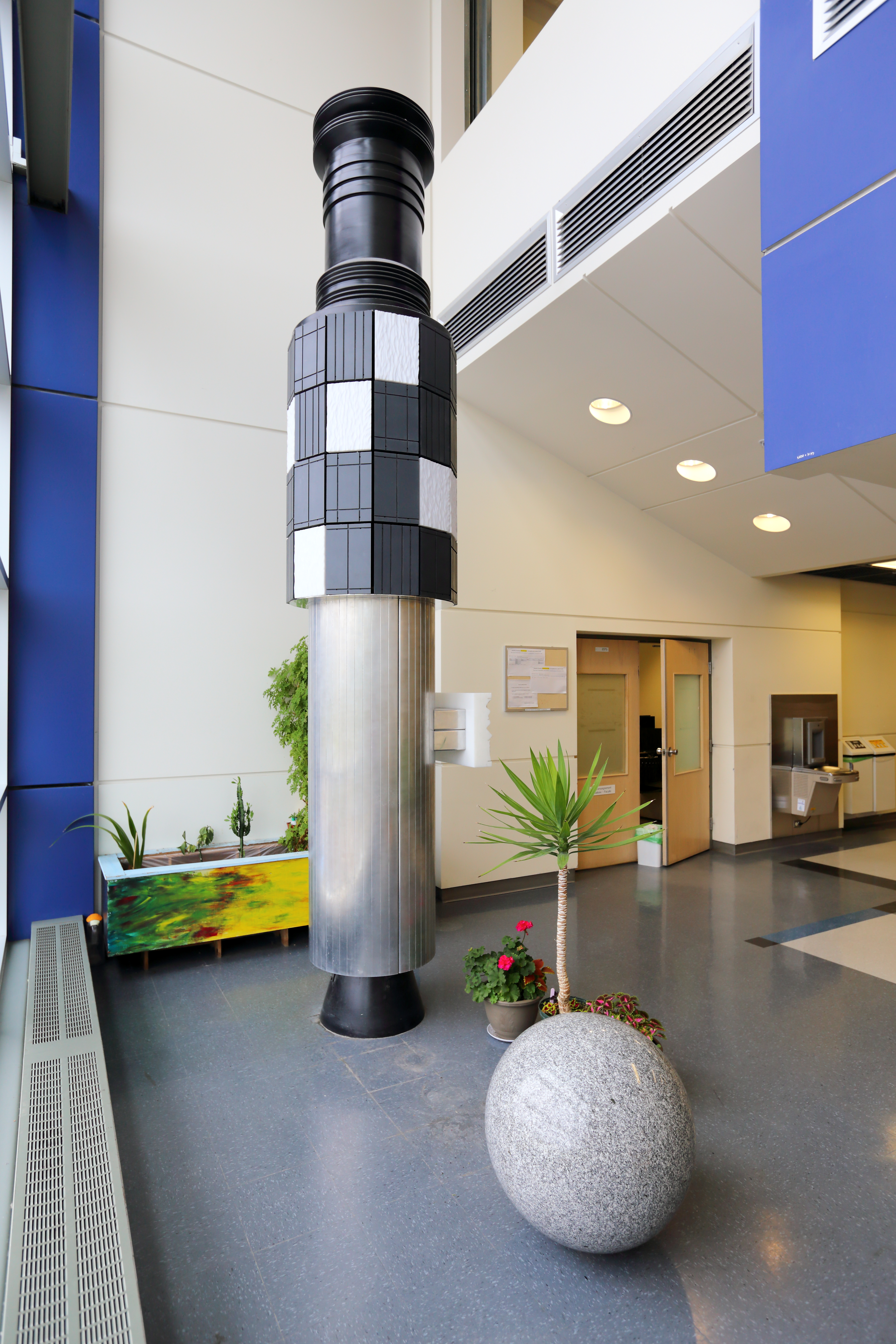
Colonne-vaisseau

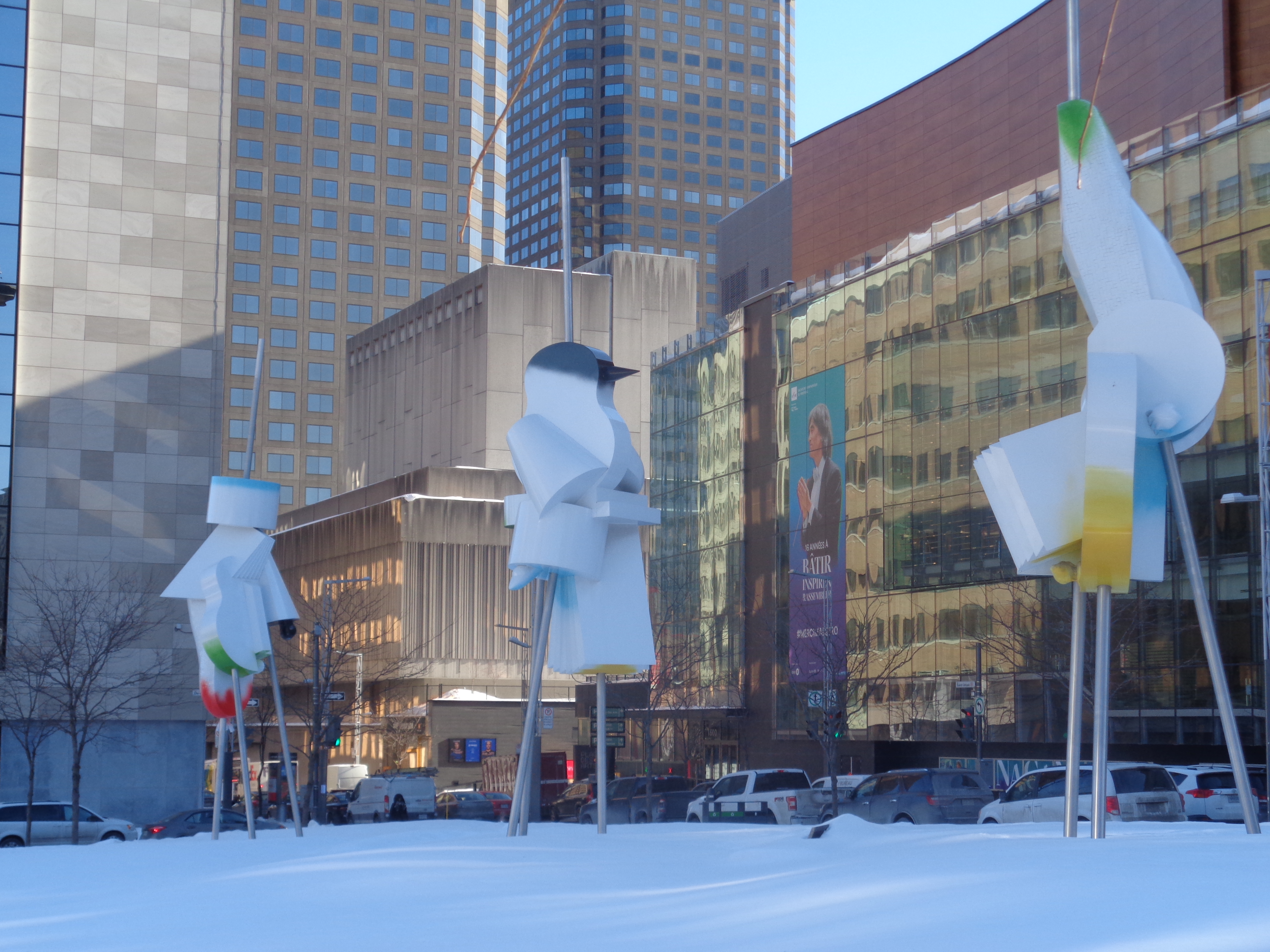
Paquets de lumière

== Awards ==
- Prix des Concours artistiques du Québec (1969)
- Victor Martyn Lynch-Staunton Award (1987)
- Bourse de carrière Jean-Paul-Riopelle (2005)
- Prix Paul-Émile-Borduas (2011)
