= Armand Vaillancourt =

Canadian visual artist (born 1929)

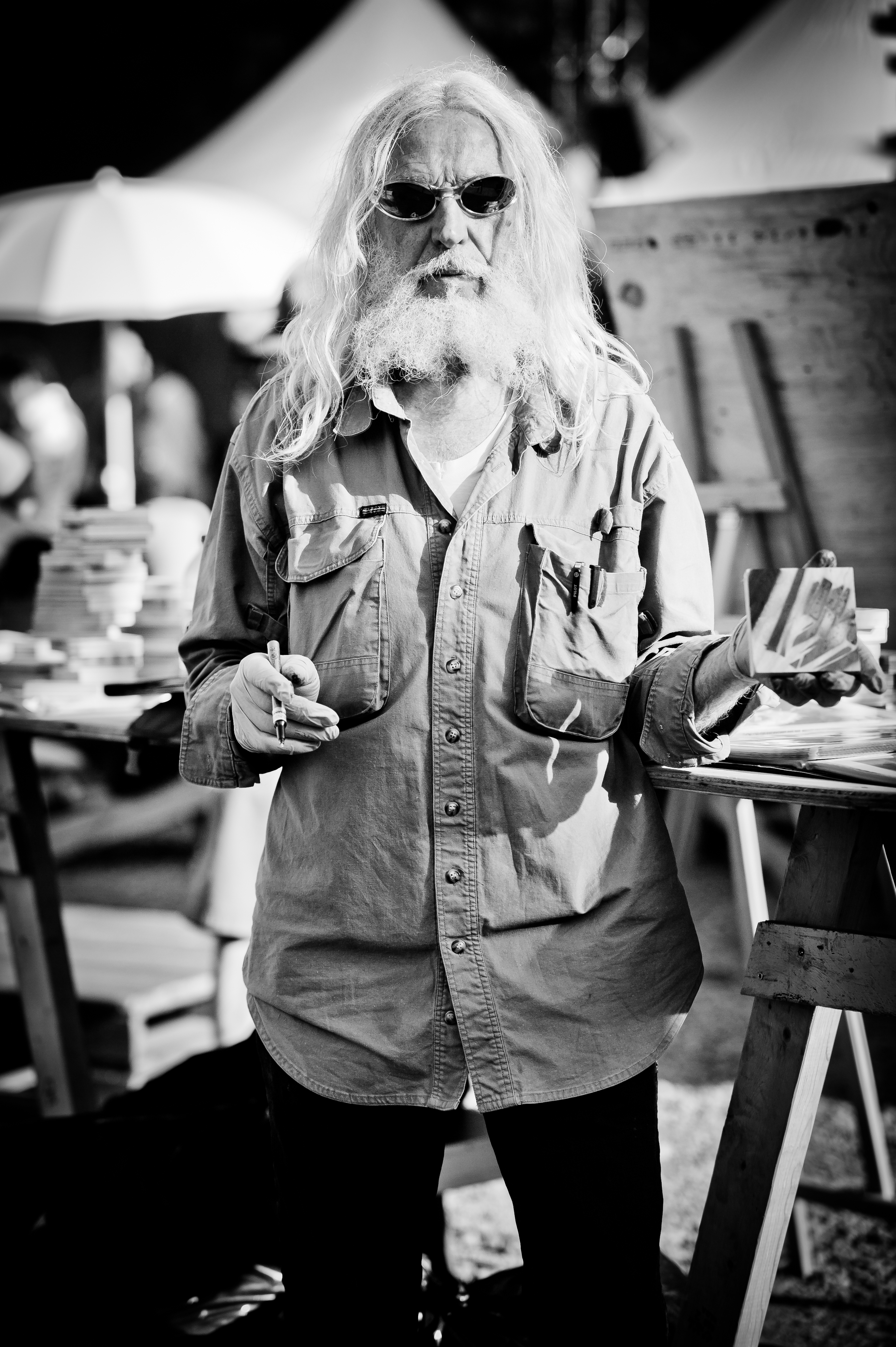
- Vaillancourt in 2012
- Born: September 3, 1929 (age 97); Black Lake, Quebec, Canada
- Known for: sculptor, painter, performance artist
- Spouse: Suzanne Verdal

Joseph Armand Robert Vaillancourt (French pronunciation: [ʒozɛf aʁmɑ̃ ʁɔbɛʁ vajɑ̃kuʁ]; born September 3, 1929) is a Canadian sculptor, painter and performance artist from Quebec. He became known for challenging establish artistic traditions in Quebec, particularly through his political engagement and large-scale public sculptures. He designed the public art fountain entitled Vaillancourt Fountain in San Francisco. He lives in Montreal.

== Biography ==
Vaillancourt was born on September 3, 1929, in Black Lake, Quebec, Canada. He received his art training at the École des beaux-arts de Montréal. During the early 1960s he was friends with Leonard Cohen, who wrote the song, "Suzanne" about Vaillancourt's girlfriend, Suzanne Verdal. Vaillancourt and Verdal have a son who lives with Verdal.

In 1971, a publicly commissioned fountain entitled Vaillancourt Fountain, often called Québec libre!, was installed in the Embarcadero Plaza in San Francisco, United States. One of his best known sculptures, Québec libre! is representative of the relationship between Vaillancourt's art and his political convictions. It is a large concrete fountain, 200 feet long, 140 feet wide and 36 feet high sitting near the city's financial district at the Embarcadero Center. The night before its inauguration, Vaillancourt inscribed Québec libre! in red letters, to note his support for the Quebec sovereignty movement and more largely, his support for the freedom of all people. The following day, seeing that the city's employees erased the inscription, he jumped on the sculpture during its dedication to reinscribe the phrase.

On November 11, 1987, the fountain became the object of an incident involving U2's singer Bono. During a free concert, Bono climbed the sculpture to spray-paint on it, "Rock N Roll Stops Traffic", referring to the power of rock. Vaillancourt flew from Quebec to California after the incident, and spoke in favor of Bono's actions at U2's Oakland performance several days later. Vaillancourt said, "Good for him. I want to shake his hand. People get excited about such a little thing."

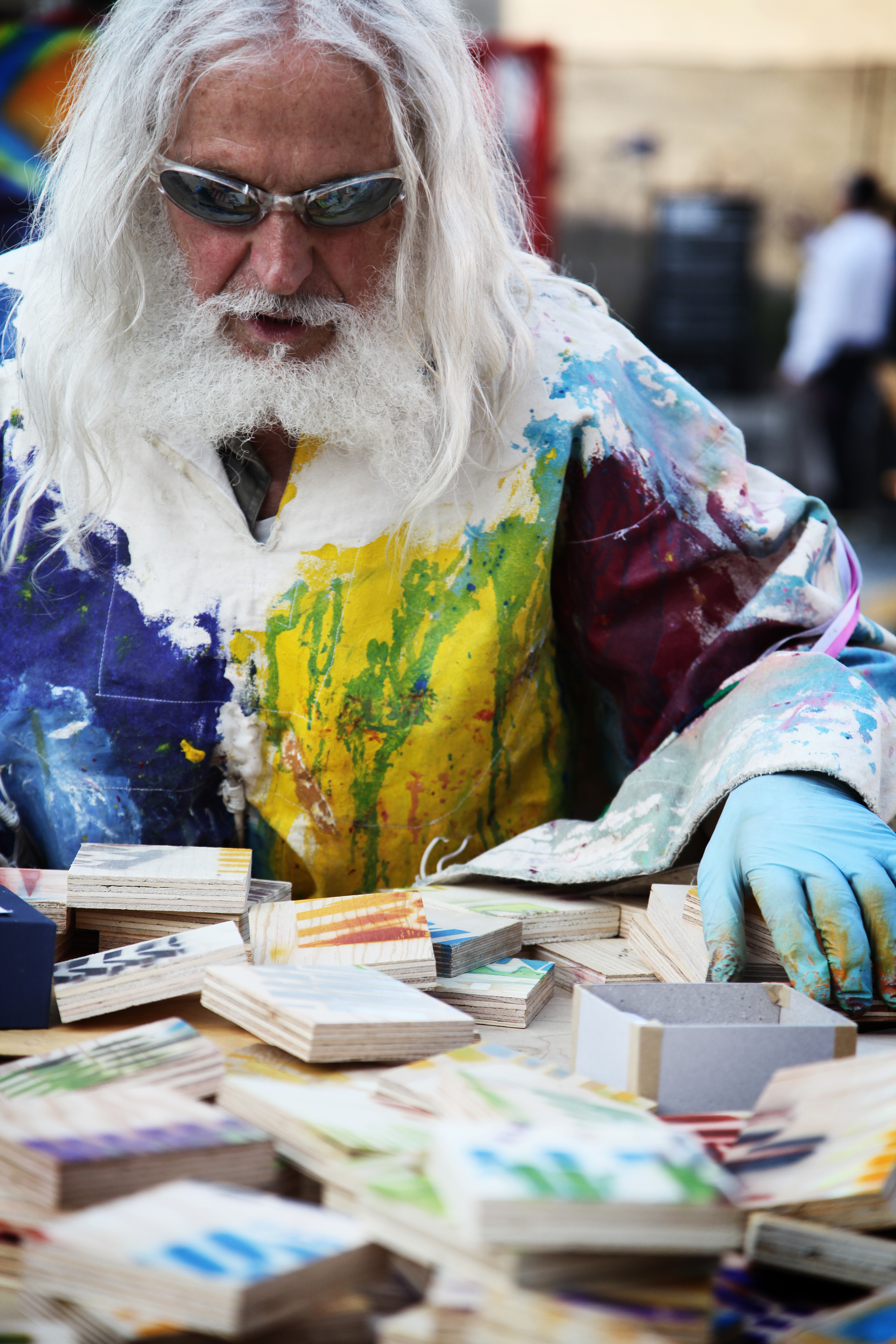
Armand Vaillancourt, C2 Montreal, May 23, 2012

As of 2008, Vaillancourt lives in a 19th-century stone house in Montreal, across the street from Jeanne-Mance Park. His archives, consisting of 500 cardboard boxes on metal shelves, plus nearly 100 notebooks in which he records all of his activities, are stored on the second floor of his house. His art has a political motivation, and, in addition to Quebec independence, he is concerned about environmental issues such as pollution caused by exploitation of oil sands, the destruction of honey bee populations, and human rights issues such as the rights of indigenous peoples. He won the Prix Paul-Émile-Borduas, awarded by the Government of Quebec in 1993. In 2004, he was awarded the title of Chevalier of the Ordre national du Québec. In 2008, a retrospective of his work was exhibited at the Musée des beaux-arts de Mont-Saint-Hilaire in Mont-Saint-Hilaire, Quebec. In 2023, Vaillancourt was named a Grand Officer of the National Order of Quebec.

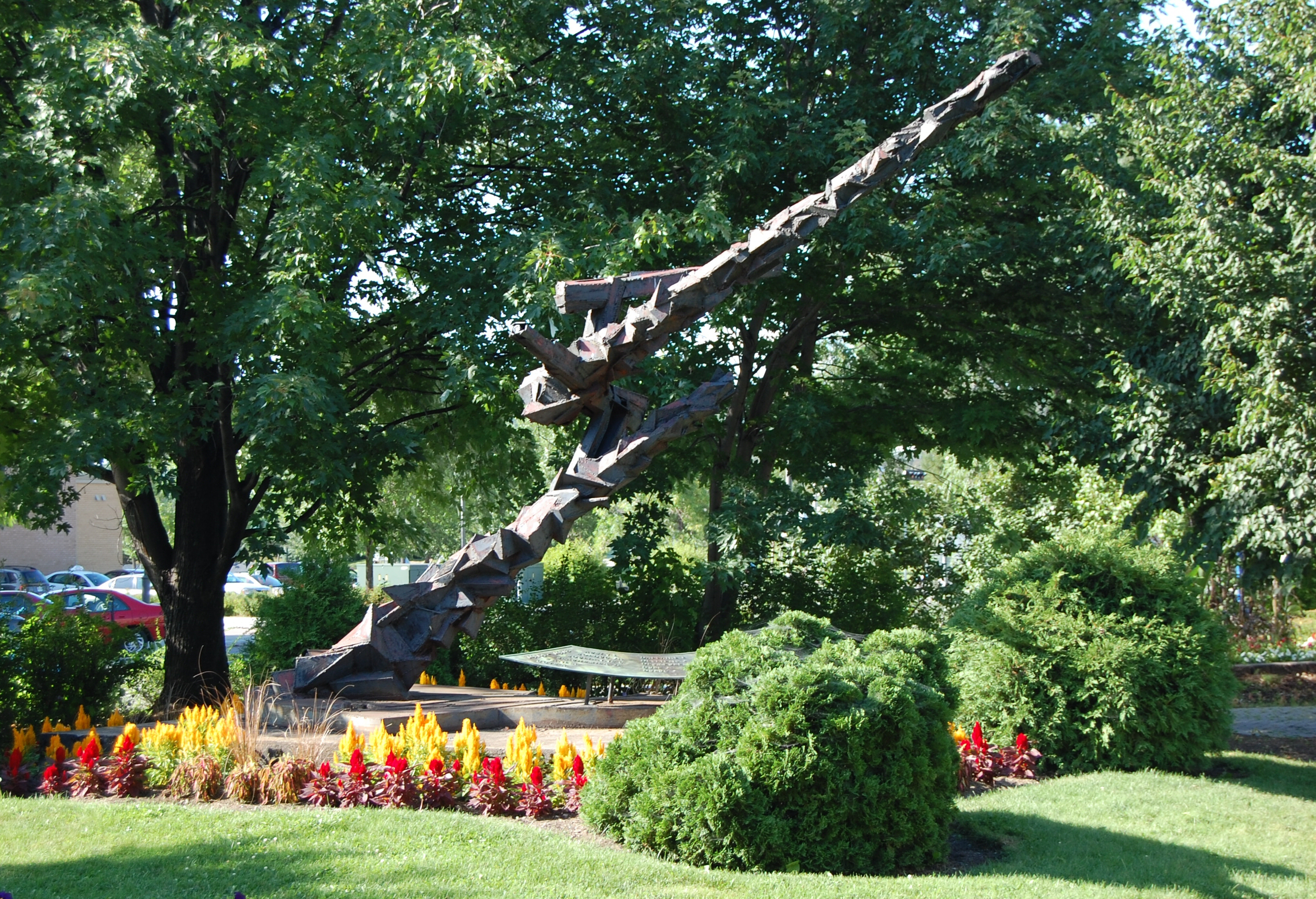
Armand Vaillancourt's Cenotaph in Chicoutimi, Quebec

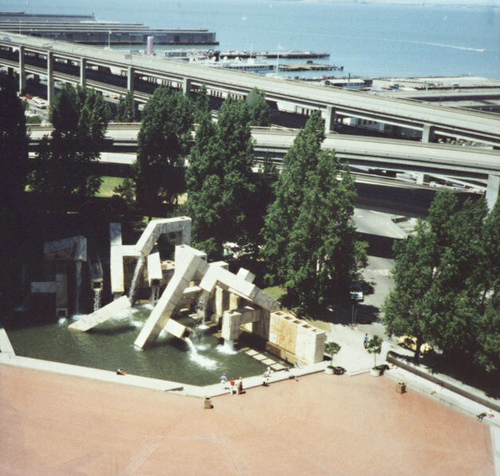
Armand Vaillancourt's fountain sculpture Québec libre ! (1971) Embarcadero Plaza (formerly Justin Herman Plaza), in San Francisco, California

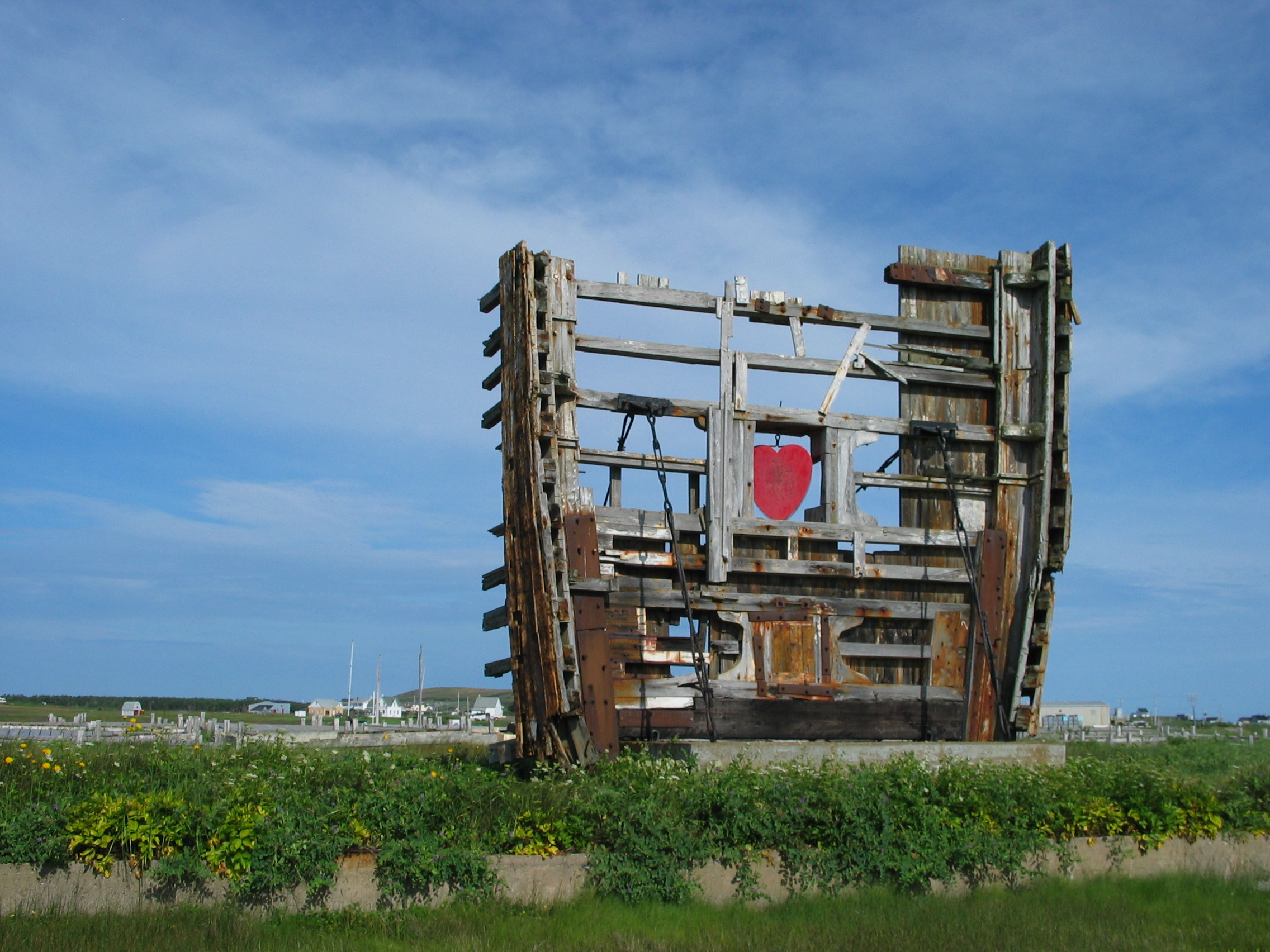
Le Coeur des Îles de Armand Vaillancourt

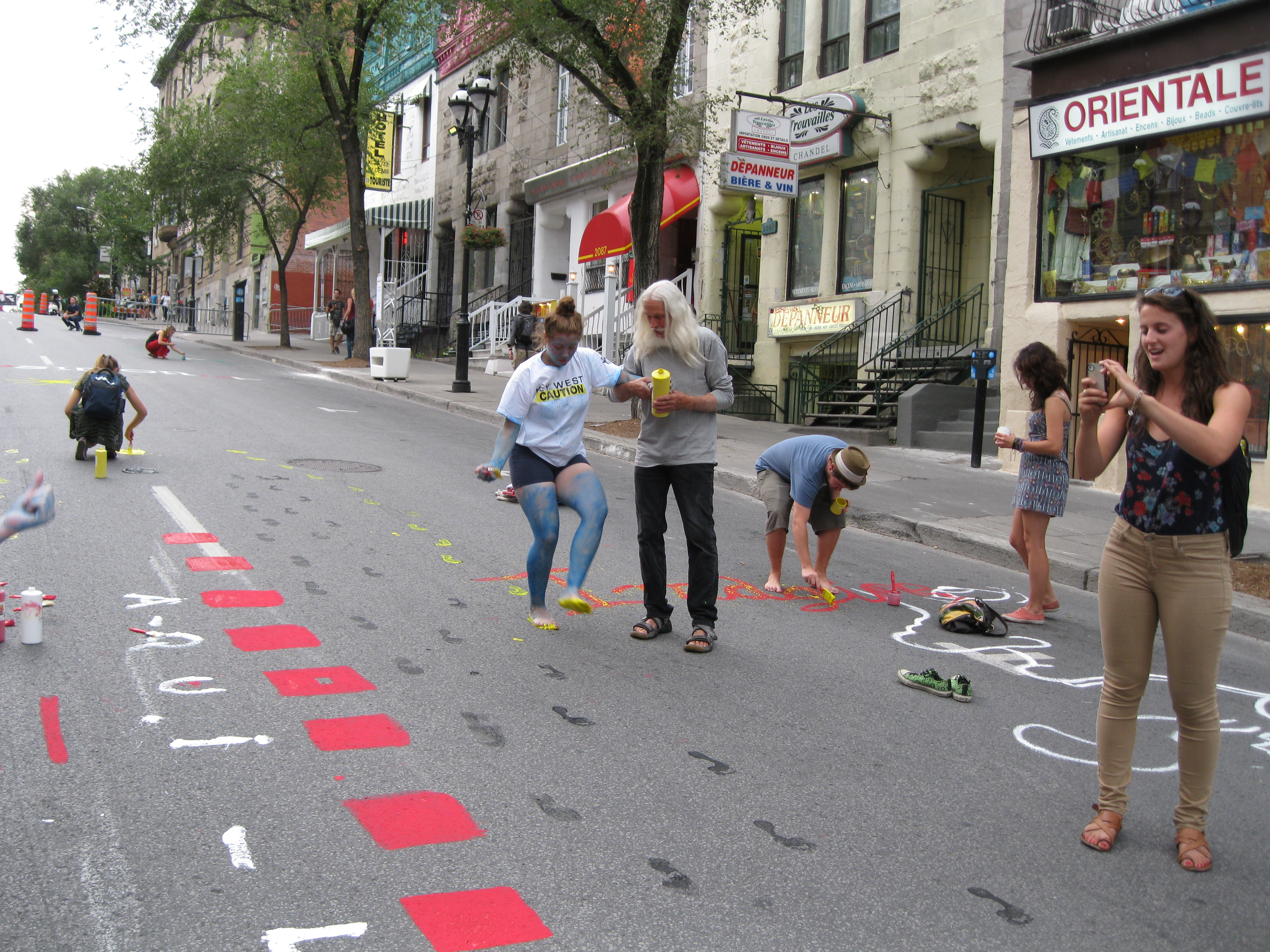
Oumf Festival Montreal

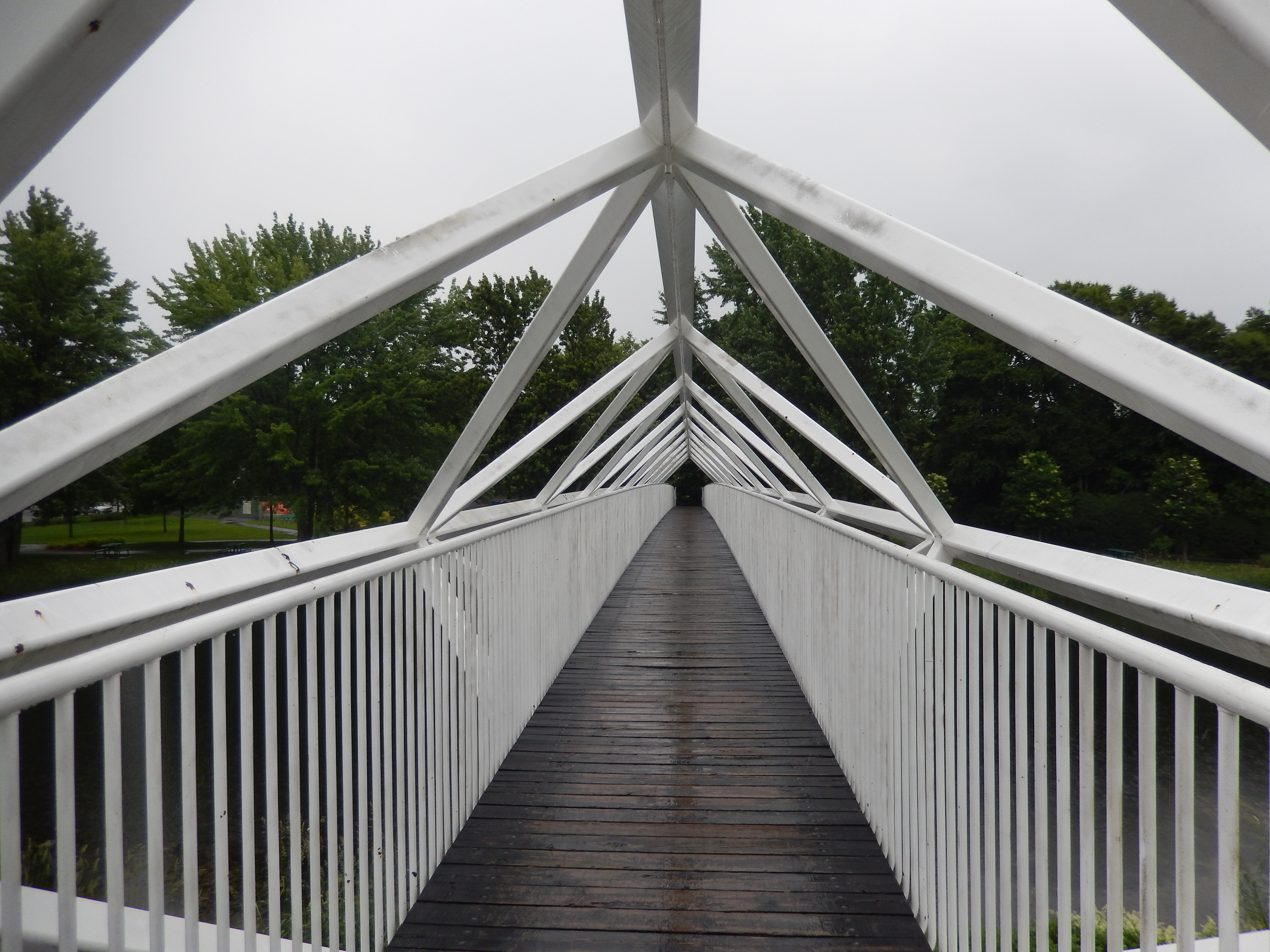
Passerelle

== Sources ==
- Grande, John K. Playing with Fire Armand Vaillancourt Social Sculptor - Zeitgeist; Montreal, Quebec, Canada, 1999
- Grande, John K. Jouer avec le feu; Armand Vaillancourt, Editions Lanctot; Montreal, Quebec, Canada 2001
- Grande, John K., Harper, Glenn, Sullivan, Francoise, Guy Sioui-Durandl, Armand Vaillancourt; Sculpture de Masse, Musee du Bas-St-Laurent, 2004
