= Irene Whittome =

Canadian multimedia artist (born 1942)

Irene F. Whittome
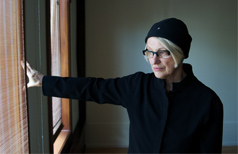
- Born: March 4, 1942 (age 84); Vancouver, British Columbia, Canada
- Education: Vancouver School of Art
- Known for: multimedia artist
- Awards: Order of Canada; Prix Paul-Émile-Borduas

Irene F. Whittome (born March 4, 1942) OC RCA, is a multimedia artist.

== Life ==
Whittome was born in Vancouver, British Columbia on March 4, 1942. She attended the Vancouver School of Art, and then spent five years studying printmaking at Stanley William Hayter's Atelier 17.

From 1968 to 2007, Whittome taught visual art in the Faculty of Fine Arts at Concordia University. She lives and works in Montreal and Ogden in Estrie.

== Work ==
Whittome has had over 35 solo exhibitions, including a major retrospective of her work at the Musée national des beaux-arts du Québec in 2000. Between 1995 and 2000 she had four solo exhibitions in institutional venues: at the CIAC – Center international d'art contemporain de Montréal (1995), at the Musée d'art contemporain de Montréal (1997), at the Canadian Centre for Architecture (1998) and at the Musée national des beaux-arts du Québec (2000). In 2001, she began working in the Stanstead area of Quebec for the production of Conversation Adru exhibited at the Art Gallery of Bishop's University (now Foreman Art Gallery) (2004). In 2003, she bought a disused granite quarry in Ogden and built her studio to work there in 2004. In 2023, the Joliette Museum organized an exhibition of her recent work titled Sublimation.

== Awards ==
In 2004, she was made an Officer of the Order of Canada. In 1997, she was awarded the Prix du Québec's Prix Paul-Émile-Borduas. She was also awarded the Victor Martyn Lynch-Staunton Award in 1989, an award for excellence in the arts from the Gershon Iskowitz Foundation in 1992, and the Governor General of Canada's Visual and Media Arts Award in 2002. She is a member of the Royal Canadian Academy of Arts.
