= Agnès Lefort =

Canadian artist

Marie-Agnès Lefort (January 5, 1891 – February 9, 1973) was a Canadian artist, educator and gallery owner living in Quebec.

She was born in Saint-Rémi and was educated by the Ursulines at Trois-Rivières. She went on to study art at the Monument-National in Montreal with Joseph Saint-Charles, Charles Gill and Edmond Dyonnet; in 1917, she won the medal awarded annually for drawing. She also undertook private studies in portrait painting with Saint-Charles and "plein air" painting with J.Y. Johnstone. In 1923, Lefort began to exhibit with the Art Association of Montreal and the Royal Canadian Academy. In 1935, she had a solo exhibition at Eaton's Art Gallery. She attended the 1941 Conference of Canadian Artists in Kingston, now known as the "Kingston Conference". She was also a founding member of the Federation of Canadian Artists. Her work was included in the exhibition "Pintura Canadense Contemporanea" in Rio de Janeiro in 1944. Lefort also exhibited at the Galerie l'Art Français in Montreal. In 1950, she retired from painting and opened the Agnès Lefort Gallery, later the Galerie Godard Lefort. It was considered one of the most important avant-garde galleries in Montreal.

She taught art classes in her studio and at Miss Edgar's and Miss Cramp's School in Westmount. She also gave radio talks on art history.

Lefort died in Montreal at the age of 82.

Her work is included in the collections of the Musée national des beaux-arts du Québec and the Montreal Museum of Fine Arts.
