= Louise Viger =

Canadian sculptor

- Born: 1940; Grand-Mère, Quebec
- Died: 2018 (aged 77–78); Montreal, Quebec
- Website: louiseviger.com

Louise Viger (1940–2018) was a Canadian sculptor.

Viger received a bachelor's degree in visual arts from Laval University and a Master of Fine Arts degree from Concordia University.

She has held solo exhibits at both the Musée d'art contemporain de Montréal and the Musée national des beaux-arts du Québec and was known for using unusual materials in her sculpture.

Her work is included in the collections of the Musée national des beaux-arts du Québec and the City of Montreal.
