= Bibliothèque et Archives nationales du Québec =

Library and archives institution

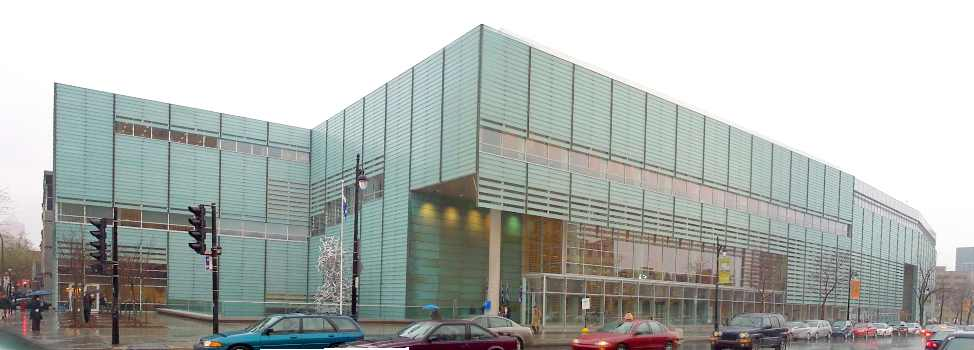
- The 33,000 square metre Grande Bibliothèque in Montreal, the main facility of the BAnQ
- 45.51538°N 73.56234°W
- Location: 475, boulevard de Maisonneuve Est; Montreal, Quebec; H2L 5C4
- Type: National library and archives
- Established: April 29, 2005

Other information
- Budget: CA$92,000,000
- Director: Jean-Louis Roy
- Parent organization: Ministry of Culture and Communications, Government of Quebec
- Website: banq.qc.ca

The Bibliothèque et Archives nationales du Québec (French pronunciation: [biblijɔtɛk e aʁʃiv nɑsjɔnal dy kebɛk]; transl. National Library and Archives of Quebec; abbr. BAnQ) is a Quebec government agency which manages the province's legal deposit system, national archives, and national library. Located at the Grande Bibliothèque in Montreal, the BAnQ was created by the merging of the Bibliothèque nationale du Québec and the Archives nationales du Québec in 2006. The Bibliothèque nationale du Québec had previously merged with the Grande Bibliothèque du Québec in 2002.

== History ==
The National Archives of Quebec (French: Archives nationales du Québec, ANQ) were founded on 2 September 1920, with Pierre-Georges Roy as Quebec's first Head Archivist. The purpose of the institution was to process historical materials, more specifically public archives and the Quebec government's archives, and to collect documents pertaining to the history of Quebec. the ANQ were brought under the jurisdiction of the Department of Cultural Affairs in 1961, and renamed the Archives de la province de Québec in 1963.

On 12 August 1967, the National Assembly of Quebec legislated to establish the National Library of Quebec (French: Bibliothèque nationale du Québec, BNQ), an institution that would also come under the Department of Cultural Affairs. The BNQ held the collections and furniture of the Bibliothèque Saint-Sulpice, founded by the Sulpician Order in 1915 and managed by the Government of Quebec since 1941.

In 1968, the provincial regulation on legal deposit came into effect requiring that Quebec publishers deposit with the BNQ two copies of their printed works, including books, brochures, newspapers, magazines and journals, artists' books and musical scores. In 1992, a regulation of the National Assembly expanded legal deposit to original prints, posters, art work reproductions, postcards, sound recordings (microgroove vinyl records, compact discs, and more), software, electronic documents, and desktop publishing.

In 1997, the idea of creating a Grande Bibliothèque was born out of the desire to provide widespread availability to the materials of the BNQ and of the Montreal Public Libraries Network. The institution founded to create a major public library, called the Grande bibliothèque du Québec (GBQ), was merged with the BNQ in 2002. The new entity pursued the acquisition, preservation and promotion of the national collection, and the acquisition and promotion of the circulating collection for the general public. The construction work of the Grande Bibliothèque took place from 2001 to 2004 in downtown Montreal, and the collections of the Montreal Library, the circulating collections of the BNQ and the new acquisitions were placed on the shelves of the Grande Bibliothèque in Fall 2004. The Grande Bibliothèque was formally inaugurated on 29 April 2005, and it began its operations on 3 May 2005.

On 31 January 2006, the Bibliothèque nationale du Québec and the Archives nationales du Québec merged to become the Bibliothèque et Archives nationales du Québec.

Following a data breach in 2021 of a related provider, several of BAnQ's online offerings were taken offline.

== Collection ==
The library's collection includes legal deposit copies of all works printed in Quebec, concerning Quebec, or written or contributed to by an author from Quebec.

== Facilities ==
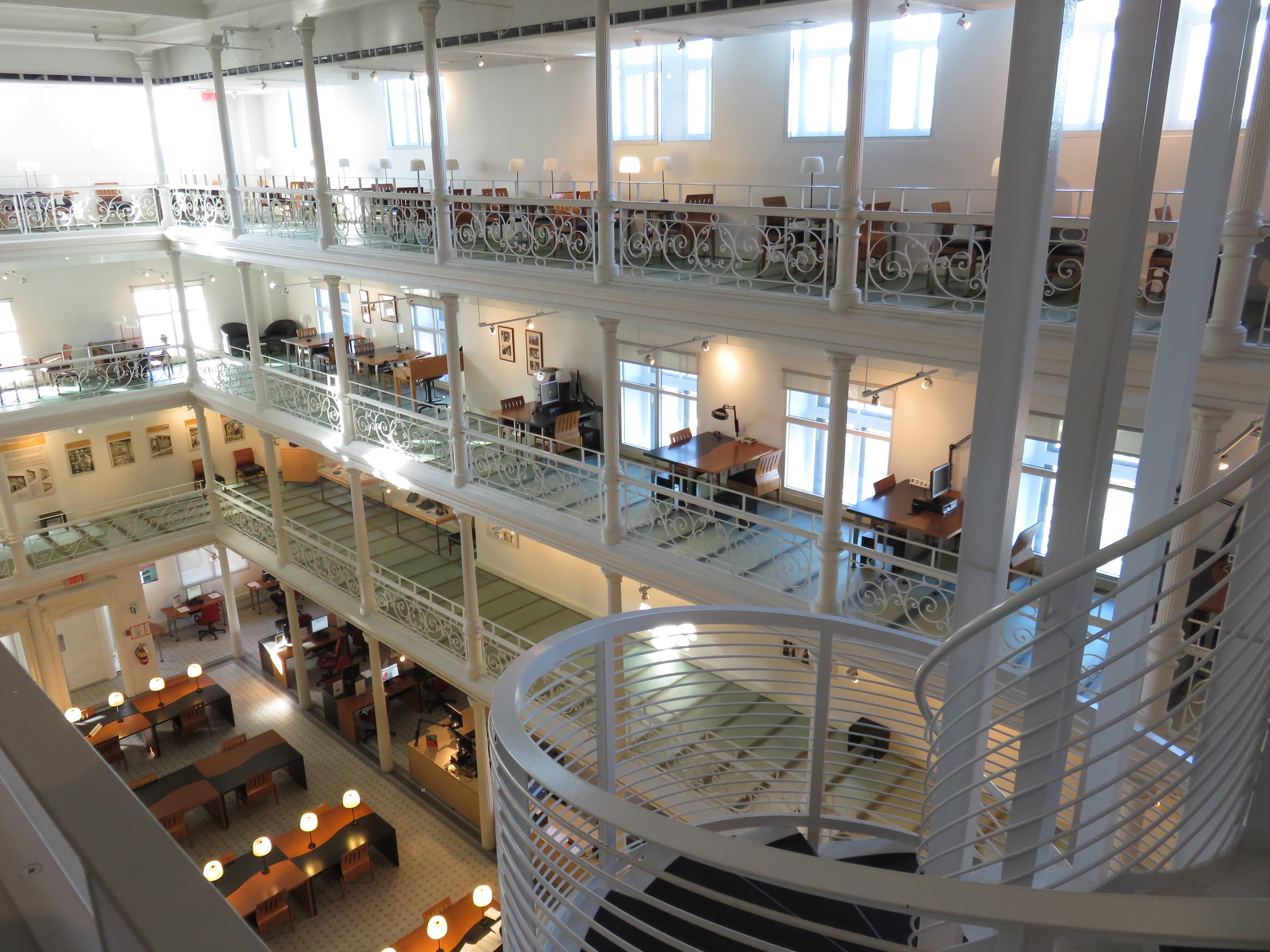
Interior in 2017

BAnQ carries out its mandate in twelve facilities which are open to the public: the Grande Bibliothèque, BAnQ Vieux-Montréal and BAnQ Rosemont–La Petite-Patrie in Montreal; BAnQ Gaspé, BAnQ Gatineau, BAnQ Québec, BAnQ Rimouski, BAnQ Rouyn-Noranda, BAnQ Saguenay, BAnQ Sept-Îles, BAnQ Sherbrooke and BAnQ Trois-Rivières.

Located in the Quartier Latin, in the heart of Montreal, the Grande Bibliothèque is the flagship library facility of the Bibliothèque et Archives nationales du Québec. This major public library was specifically designed to encourage the discovery and exploration of BAnQ's collections with free and open access. Materials from the universal collection are available for circulation while rarer documents such as most of the legal deposit collection can be consulted on site. The building, each of its six levels fostering a different atmosphere, opened to the public in 2005. Its patrons include scholars and the general public alike. It welcomes close to 50,000 visitors each week.

== Mission ==
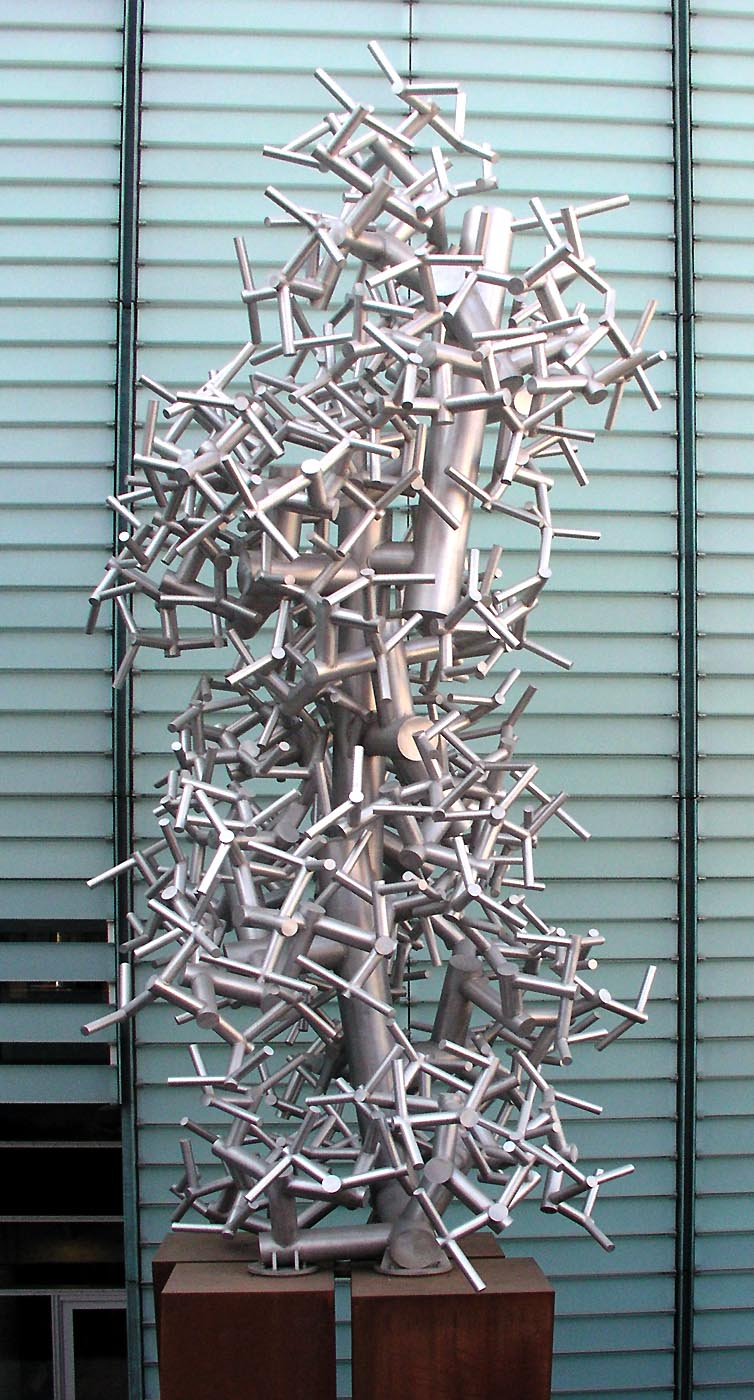
Jean-Pierre Morin's sculpture Espace Fractal outside Bibliothèque et Archives nationales du Québec in Montreal Canada

The mission of Bibliothèque et Archives nationales du Québec is to gather, permanently preserve and promote Quebec's published heritage materials, any Quebec-related material of cultural interest, and any Quebec-related material published outside Quebec. It aims to provide democratic access to the heritage material constituted by its collections, to culture and universal knowledge, and to act, in this respect, as a catalyst for the library and information institutions of Quebec, thus contributing to the fulfillment of its citizens.

BAnQ also aims to provide structure, support and advise public bodies regarding the management of their materials, ensure the preservation of public archives, make them more accessible and boost their visibility. The institution is also responsible for promoting the preservation and accessibility of private archives. To this end, BAnQ carries out the responsibilities provided under the Archives Act. In the archival field, the institution can also provide research support services and contribute to the development and international outreach of Quebec heritage materials and expertise.

BAnQ serves as the official representative of the Agence francophone pour la numérotation internationale du livre regarding the assignment of ISBN prefixes in Quebec and Canada.

=== National library ===
BAnQ is responsible for acquiring, processing, preserving and highlighting the heritage collections. These collections bring together the entire production of printed materials in Quebec, mostly through legal deposit, and of Quebec-related materials. The Preservation Branch (Direction générale de la conservation) which handles this aspect of the institution's mission, operates out of BAnQ Rosemont–La Petite-Patrie, in Montreal. Designed to ensure the long-term preservation of the materials stored there, the facility also houses BAnQ's head office. Patrons can access the heritage collections' materials in the reading room of the Collection nationale, located in the Grande Bibliothèque. The special collections, however, can be viewed on site at BAnQ Rosemont–La Petite-Patrie.

=== National archives ===
Bibliothèque et Archives nationales du Québec carries out its activities in the archival field through 10 regional facilities: BAnQ Vieux-Montréal, BAnQ Québec, BAnQ Gaspé, BAnQ Gatineau, BAnQ Rimouski, BAnQ Saguenay, BAnQ Sherbrooke, BAnQ Trois-Rivières, BAnQ Rouyn-Noranda and BAnQ Sept-Îles.

The Montreal facility is housed in the Gilles Hocquart Building, formerly the HEC Montréal building, on Avenue Viger. The Quebec City facility is located in the Louis-Jacques-Casault pavilion on the Université Laval campus.

=== Digitized collection ===
BAnQ operates a web portal, BAnQ numérique, to distribute its digitized collections of books and newspapers.

== See also ==
- Gilles-Hocquart Building
- Library and Archives Canada
