= Marnie Fleming =

Canadian curator and writer

Marnie Fleming is a Canadian curator and writer who served as curator of Contemporary Art at Oakville Galleries from 1991 to 2014. She curated over 200 exhibitions and contributed to the development of contemporary art practices in Canada through writing, mentorship, and institutional leadership. She was recognized with the Governor General's Awards in Visual and Media Arts in 2016 and received a Lifetime Achievement Award from the Ontario Association of Art Galleries in 2014.

== Early life and education ==
Fleming was born in Leamington, Ontario, and raised in Windsor, Ontario. She earned an Honours Bachelor of Arts in art history from the University of Windsor in 1977 and a Master of Arts in art history from the University of British Columbia in 1979.

She began her professional career at the Vancouver Art Gallery, working in the Extension and Education Departments from 1980 to 1986. In 1987, she became Curator of Contemporary Art at the London Regional Art Gallery (now Museum London), where she served until 1991.

== Oakville Galleries (1991–2014) ==
Fleming assumed her role in 1991 when the galleries held a largely local mandate. Under her direction, Oakville Galleries evolved into one of Canada's most dynamic centers for contemporary art, noted for nationally significant exhibitions, ambitious publishing programs, and innovative collection-building strategies.

Her curatorial approach was grounded in critical theory and focused on the relationships between identity, place, and the suburban context of Oakville. She emphasized participatory and site-responsive practices, encouraging artists to engage with Oakville's social and built environments. Among the national and international artists she organized exhibitions for were Tatsuo Miyajima, Stephen Andrews, Alfredo Jaar, Liz Magor, Ken Lum, Colette Whiten, Kimsooja, David Rokeby, and Iñigo Manglano-Ovalle.

Her major group exhibitions included Track Records: Trains and Contemporary Photography (1997), Is there a there there? (2007), and Auto-Motive: World through the Windshield (2013). Her final exhibition at Oakville Galleries, You've Really Got a Hold on Me (2014), was a retrospective drawn from the collection she helped build.

== Publishing and collections ==
Fleming was a vocal advocate for the publishing role of regional art museums. Under her leadership in the 1990s and 2000s, Oakville Galleries became one of Canada's most prolific museum publishers. Her essays were noted for their theoretical rigor and accessible prose.

Key publications include:

- Micah Lexier: Book Sculptures (1993)
- Track Records: Trains and Contemporary Photography (1997)
- David Mabb: The Decorating Business (2000)
- Janet Cardiff: A Large Slow River (2000)
- Kim Adams (co-published with The Power Plant, 2002)
- Roy Arden: Selected Works 1985–2000 (2002)
- John Greyson and David Wall: Fig Trees (2003)
- Angela Grauerholz: The Inexhaustible Image (National Gallery of Canada, 2010)

She also played a significant role in shaping the permanent collection, acquiring works by prominent Canadian and international artists including Janet Cardiff, David Rokeby, Mark Lewis, Ian Wallace, Aganetha Dyck, Rodney Graham, Kim Adams, Micah Lexier, Robert Fones, and Lisa Steele.

== Awards and recognition ==
In 2000, Fleming received the Ontario Association of Art Galleries' Curatorial Writing Award for her essay in Colin Darke: Labour in Irish History. She won the same award again in 2001 for Tania Kitchell: White Out.

In 2014, she was presented with a Lifetime Achievement Award by the same organization. In 2016, Fleming received the Governor General's Award in Visual and Media Arts in the Outstanding Contribution category, administered by the Canada Council for the Arts.

== Critical reception ==
Fleming has been praised for her artist-centered curatorial practice. Alfredo Jaar described her as "an artist's curator," noting her thoughtful dialogue and fearless vision.

In a 2014 review in the Toronto Star, art critic Murray Whyte credited her with transforming Oakville Galleries into "one of the country's most important art institutions," citing her early support of Canadian artists in contrast to larger museums' focus on "ticket sales and marquee imports".
