= Parachute (magazine) =

Contemporary art magazine

- PARACHUTE 1, fall 1975 (contemporary art magazine), cover: Vladimir Tatlin, Monument to the 3rd International, draft drawing, 1919; graphic design: Roland Poulin. Chantal Pontbriand editor and publisher
- Editor: Chantal Pontbriand
- Categories: Arts
- Frequency: Quarterly
- Circulation: 5,0000
- Publisher: Artdata
- Founder: Chantal Pontbriand
- Founded: 1974
- First issue: October 1975
- Final issue Number: April 2009; 125
- Country: Canada
- Based in: Montreal, Québec
- Language: English, French
- ISSN: 0318-7020

Parachute - revue d'art contemporain was a bilingual French and English contemporary art magazine. It was published quarterly in October, January and April. One issue each year was dedicated to an emerging metropolis for contemporary art. Parachute was concerned primarily with the visual arts and museology. The magazine occasionally devoted articles to other art forms when they transcended their conventional boundaries and provoked theoretical debates. The last issue, No. 125, appeared in 2009 when decreasing funding levels made it impossible to continue operation.

Parachute was founded by René Blouin and Chantal Pontbriand, who met at Véhicule, one of the first artist-run centres in Canada, (together with A Space and the Western Front) and the Research Group in Arts Administration.

Pontbriand was writing for Artscanada and Vie des Arts fr:Vie des arts, the only two art magazines in Canada at that time.

Funding for the first issue was provided by Véhicule. Blouin was replaced by France Morin.

Initially, funding was provided by the Canada Council and the Ministry of Culture of Quebec, before the Quebec Arts Council was formed, lastly the City of Montreal, which has its own arts council, provided funding.

== First fifteen years ==
Early issues were printed in black and white, letter-sized. The first issue contained an article by Irwin and Myrna Gopnik about John Heward. The fourth issue was published in collaboration with Joseph Beuys. The board consisted of Melvin Charney, Robert Graham, and Raymond Gervais. Anne Ramsden served as an associate editor for Parachute magazine from 1980 to 1982.

== 2000s ==
A new, smaller book format was introduced in 2000. Until then, Parachute had been published in black and white and in a large, staple bound magazine format 22.5 x 30.5 cm.

A number of thematic issues weer published, three in "community", and others on "resistance," "democracy," "violence," and "economies". Parachute also concerned itself with emerging art centres. The first “City” issue was Mexico City with Cuauhtémoc Medina as guest editor, then Beirut (2002), Shanghai, São Paulo, and Havana.

Parachute participated in Documenta 12 magazines, a project of the 12th edition (2007) of the documenta exhibition.

The magazine was supported by the Canada Council for the Arts and the Conseil des arts et des lettres du Québec Increased postal rates in 2000 contributed to the financial difficulties, as did quotas for local content (increased scrutiny by funding organizations into how much local content was in the magazine versus foreign content).

The board of directors consisted of Jean-Pierre Grémy (chairman), Chantal Pontbriand (president), Colette Tougas (treasurer), Mary Ann Ferguson, Paul Fraser, Robert Hackett, Johanne Lamoureux and Réjean Legault.

=== Publications ===
Crimp, Thomas Crow et al Douglas. Parachute. Essais Choisis 1975-1984 Sous La Direction De Chantal Pontbriand. Exhibitions International. ISBN 978-2-87317-253-4.
