= List of recipients of the Governor General's Award in Visual and Media Arts =

Governor General's Awards in Visual and Media Arts
- Description: Annual awards for outstanding career achievement in visual and media arts
- Country: Canada
- Presented by: Canada Council for the Arts
- Website: http://ggarts.ca

The Governor General's Awards in Visual and Media Arts are annual awards for achievements in visual and media arts in Canada. Up to eight awards are presented annually, each with a prize amount of $25,000.

Created in 2000 by then Governor General Adrienne Clarkson, the awards are managed by the Canada Council for the Arts. An independent peer jury of senior visual and media arts professionals selects up to seven laureates to be recognized for artistic achievement and one award for outstanding contributions in a professional or volunteer role. Visual and media artists in fine arts (painting, drawing, photography, print-making and sculpture, including installation and other three-dimensional work), applied arts (architecture and fine crafts), independent film and video, and audio and new media are eligible for the annual award. Since 2007, the Saidye Bronfman Award for excellence in the fine crafts is also awarded by this process.

In 2015, each laureate received $25,000 and recognition in the form of an exhibition at the National Gallery of Canada.

== Laureates (2000–2023) ==
Year	Name	Award	Field	Location
2000	Jocelyne Alloucherie	Artistic Achievement	Sculpture	Montreal, QC
2000	Ghitta Caiserman-Roth	Artistic Achievement	Painting	Montreal, QC
2000	John Chalke	Artistic Achievement	Fine crafts	Calgary, AB
2000	Jacques Giraldeau	Artistic Achievement	Film	Montreal, QC
2000	John Scott	Artistic Achievement	Painting	Toronto, ON
2000	Doris Shadbolt	Outstanding Contribution	Voluntarism	Vancouver, BC
2000	Michael Snow	Artistic Achievement	Film	Toronto, ON
2001	Russell C. Goodman	Artistic Achievement	Stained glass artist	Kelowna, BC
2001	Douglas Cardinal	Artistic Achievement	Architect	Ottawa, ON
2001	Joan Chalmers	Outstanding Contribution	Philanthropist	Toronto, ON
2001	Tom Dean	Artistic Achievement	Visual artist	Toronto, ON
2001	Jamelie Hassan	Artistic Achievement	Visual artist	London, ON
2001	Liz Magor	Artistic Achievement	Visual artist	Vancouver, BC
2001	Alanis Obomsawin	Artistic Achievement	Filmmaker	Montreal, QC
2002	AA Bronson	Artistic Achievement	Visual artist	Toronto and New York
2002	Charles Gagnon	Artistic Achievement	Visual artist	Montreal, QC
2002	Ydessa Hendeles	Outstanding Contribution	Curator, art collector and philanthropist	Toronto, ON
2002	Edward Poitras	Artistic Achievement	Visual artist	Regina, SK and Québec City, QC
2002	David Rokeby	Artistic Achievement	Media artist	Toronto, ON
2002	Barbara Steinman	Artistic Achievement	Visual artist	Montreal, QC
2002	Irene Whittome	Artistic Achievement	Visual artist	Montreal, QC
2003	Robert Archambeau	Artistic Achievement	Ceramist	Winnipeg, MB
2003	Alex Colville	Artistic Achievement	Painter	Wolfville, NS
2003	Gathie Falk	Artistic Achievement	Visual artist	Vancouver, BC
2003	Betty Goodwin	Artistic Achievement	Visual artist	Montreal, QC
2003	Walter Harris	Artistic Achievement	Sculptor	Hazelton, BC
2003	Suzanne Rivard-Lemoyne	Outstanding Contribution	Arts educator and administrator	Montreal, QC
2003	Takao Tanabe	Artistic Achievement	Painter	Parksville, BC
2004	Iain Baxter	Artistic Achievement	Visual artist	Windsor, ON
2004	Eric Cameron	Artistic Achievement	Painter	Calgary, AB
2004	Tom Hill	Outstanding Contribution	Curator, artist and Aboriginal arts advocate	Ohsweken, ON
2004	Istvan Kantor	Artistic Achievement	Media artist	Toronto, ON
2004	Garry Neill Kennedy	Artistic Achievement	Painter	Halifax, NS
2004	John Oswald	Artistic Achievement	Media artist	Toronto, ON
2004	Ian Wallace	Artistic Achievement	Painter	Vancouver, BC
2005	Carl Beam	Artistic Achievement	Visual artist	Manitoulin Island, ON
2005	Lynne Cohen	Artistic Achievement	Photographer	Montreal, QC
2005	Claude Gosselin	Outstanding Contribution	Curator	Montreal, QC
2005	Roland Poulin	Artistic Achievement	Sculptor	Sainte-Angèle-de-Monnoir, QC
2005	Lisa Steele and Kim Tomczak	Artistic Achievement	Video artists	Toronto, ON
2005	Françoise Sullivan	Artistic Achievement	Painter, sculptor and dancer	Montreal, QC
2005	Paul Wong	Artistic Achievement	Video artist	Vancouver, BC
2006	Mowry Baden	Artistic Achievement	Sculptor	Victoria, BC
2006	Micheline Beauchemin	Artistic Achievement	Textile artist and weaver	Les Grondines, QC
2006	Vera Frenkel	Artistic Achievement	Multidisciplinary artist	Toronto, ON
2006	Peggy Gale	Outstanding Contribution	Independent curator, writer	Toronto, ON
2006	Kenneth Lochhead	Artistic Achievement	Painter	Ottawa, ON
2006	Arnaud Maggs	Artistic Achievement	Visual artist	Toronto, ON
2006	Peter Wintonick	Artistic Achievement	Film producer, director, critic and editor	Montreal, QC
2007	Ian Carr-Harris	Artistic Achievement	Sculptor, installation, photographer	Toronto, ON
2007	Aganetha Dyck	Artistic Achievement	Sculptor, installation, mixed media artist	Winnipeg, MB
2007	Bruce Elder	Artistic Achievement	Filmmaker	Toronto, ON
2007	Murray Favro	Artistic Achievement	Multidisciplinary artist	London, ON
2007	Fernand Leduc	Artistic Achievement	Painter	Montreal, QC
2007	Daphne Odjig	Artistic Achievement	Painter, printmaker	Penticton, BC
2007	David Silcox	Outstanding Contribution	Arts advocate, writer, educator	Toronto, ON
2008	Kenojuak Ashevak	Artistic Achievement	Drawing, printmaking and sculpture	Cape Dorset, NV
2008	Serge Giguère	Artistic Achievement	Filmmaker	Saint-Norbert-d'Arthabaska, QC
2008	Michel Goulet	Artistic Achievement	Sculptor	Montreal, QC
2008	Alex Janvier	Artistic Achievement	Painter	Cold Lake, AB
2008	Tanya Mars	Artistic Achievement	Performance artist	Toronto, ON
2008	Eric Metcalfe	Artistic Achievement	Multidisciplinary artist	Vancouver, BC
2008	Shirley Thomson	Outstanding Contribution	Cultural administrator, gallery director and arts advocate	Ottawa, ON
2009	John Greer	Artistic Achievement	Sculptor	LaHave, NS
2009	Nobuo Kubota	Artistic Achievement	Sculptor, musician, and performer	Toronto, ON
2009	Rita McKeough	Artistic Achievement	Interdisciplinary artist	Calgary, AB
2009	Robert Morin	Artistic Achievement	Filmmaker	Montreal, QC
2009	Raymond Moriyama	Artistic Achievement	Architect	Toronto, ON
2009	Gordon Smith	Artistic Achievement	Painter	West Vancouver, BC
2009	Tony Urquhart and Kim Ondaatje	Outstanding Contribution	Founders, CARFAC, the Canadian Artists’ Representation/Le Front des artistes Canadiens	Stratford, ON (Urquhart); Verona, ON (Ondaatje)
2010	Robert Davidson	Artistic Achievement	Sculptor	White Rock, BC
2010	André Forcier	Artistic Achievement	Filmmaker	Longueuil, QC
2010	Rita Letendre	Artistic Achievement	Painter	Toronto, ON
2010	Terry Ryan	Outstanding Contribution	Manager, West Baffin Eskimo Co-operative (now Kinngait Studios)	Toronto, ON
2010	Tom Sherman	Artistic Achievement	Video artist	Toronto, ON
2010	Gabor Szilasi	Artistic Achievement	Photographer	Westmount, QC
2010	Claude Tousignant	Artistic Achievement	Painter, sculptor	Montreal, QC
2011	Robert Fones	Artistic Achievement	Visual artist	Toronto, ON
2011	Geneviève Cadieux	Artistic Achievement	Photographer	Montreal, QC
2011	Michael Morris	Artistic Achievement	Visual, performance artist	Vancouver/Victoria, BC
2011	David Rimmer	Artistic Achievement	Filmmaker	Vancouver, BC
2011	Barbara Sternberg	Artistic Achievement	Filmmaker	Toronto, ON
2011	Nancy Tousley	Outstanding Contribution	Art critic	Calgary, AB
2011	Shirley Wiitasalo	Artistic Achievement	Painter	Toronto, ON
2012	Margaret Dragu	Artistic Achievement	Performance artist	Vancouver/Richmond, BC
2012	Geoffrey James	Artistic Achievement	Photographer	Toronto, ON
2012	Ron Martin	Artistic Achievement	Visual artist	Toronto, ON
2012	Diana Nemiroff	Outstanding Contribution	Art gallery director and curator	Ottawa, ON
2012	Jan Peacock	Artistic Achievement	Visual artist - media and installation	Halifax, NS
2012	Royden Rabinowitch	Artistic Achievement	Sculptor	Waterloo, ON
2012	Jana Sterbak	Artistic Achievement	Visual artist	Montreal, QC
2013	Marcel Barbeau	Artistic Achievement	Painter and sculptor	Montreal, QC
2013	Rebecca Belmore	Artistic Achievement	Painter	Winnipeg, MB
2013	William D. MacGillivray	Artistic Achievement	Filmmaker and director	Rose Bay NS
2013	Gordon Monahan	Artistic Achievement	Sound artist, composer and media artist	Meaford, ON
2013	Chantal Pontbriand	Outstanding Contribution	Curator and art critic	Montreal, QC and Paris
2013	Colette Whiten	Artistic Achievement	Sculpture installation artist	Toronto/Haliburton, ON
2014	Kim Adams	Artistic Achievement	Sculptor	Toronto, ON
2014	Max Dean	Artistic Achievement	Multidisciplinary visual artist	Toronto, ON
2014	Raymond Gervais	Artistic Achievement	Performance and installation artist	Montreal, QC
2014	Angela Grauerholz	Artistic Achievement	Photographer/visual artist	Montreal, QC
2014	Jayce Salloum	Artistic Achievement	Media artist	Vancouver, BC
2014	Brydon Smith	Outstanding Contribution	Curator	Ottawa, ON
2014	Carol Wainio	Artistic Achievement	Painter	Ottawa, ON
2015	Louise Déry	Outstanding Contribution	Curator	Montreal, QC
2015	Robert Houle	Artistic Achievement	Visual artist	Toronto, ON
2015	Micah Lexier	Artistic Achievement	Visual artist	Toronto, ON
2015	Rafael Lozano-Hemmer	Artistic Achievement	Media artist	Montreal, QC
2015	Sandra Meigs	Artistic Achievement	Painter	Victoria, BC
2015	Rober Racine	Artistic Achievement	Visual artist, writer and composer	Montreal, QC
2015	Reva Stone	Artistic Achievement	New media artist	Winnipeg, MB
2016	Edward Burtynsky	Artistic Achievement	Photographer	
2016	Marnie Fleming	Outstanding Contribution	Curator	
2016	Philip Hoffman	Artistic Achievement	Filmmaker	
2016	Wanda Koop	Artistic Achievement	Visual artist	
2016	Suzy Lake	Artistic Achievement	Visual artist	
2016	Mark Lewis	Artistic Achievement	Video artist	
2016	William (Bill) Vazan	Artistic Achievement	Visual artist	
2017	Michèle Cournoyer	Artistic Achievement	Animator	Montreal, QC
2017	Glenn Lewis	Artistic Achievement	Visual artist	
2017	Landon Mackenzie	Artistic Achievement	Visual artist	
2017	Mike Hoolboom	Artistic Achievement	Filmmaker	
2017	Shelagh Keeley	Artistic Achievement	Visual artist	
2017	Philip Monk	Outstanding Contribution	Curator, writer	
2017	Shelley Niro	Artistic Achievement	Visual artist	
2018	Bruce Eves	Artistic Achievement	Visual artist	Toronto, ON
2018	Wyn Geleynse	Artistic Achievement	Visual artist, media arts	London, ON
2018	Spring Hurlbut	Artistic Achievement	Visual artist	Toronto, ON
2018	Midi Onodera	Artistic Achievement	Visual artist, filmmaker	Toronto, ON
2018	Sandra Semchuk	Artistic Achievement	Visual artist, photographer	Vancouver, BC
2018	Adrian Stimson	Artistic Achievement	Visual artist, performance artist	Siksika, AB
2018	Glenn Alteen	Outstanding Contribution	Curator	Vancouver, BC
2019	Stephen Andrews	Artistic Achievement	Visual artist	Toronto, ON
2019	COZIC (Yvon Cozic and Monic Brassard)	Artistic Achievement	Visual artist	Sainte-Anne-de-la-Rochelle, QC
2019	Marlene Creates	Artistic Achievement	Visual artist	Portugal Cove, NL
2019	Ali Kazimi	Artistic Achievement	Visual artist and filmmaker	Toronto, ON
2019	Lee-Anne Martin	Outstanding Contribution	Curator	Carp, ON
2019	Andrew J. Paterson	Artistic Achievement	Media artist	Toronto, ON
2019	Jeff Thomas	Artistic Achievement	Photo-based storyteller	Ottawa, ON
2020	Zainub Verjee	Outstanding Contribution	Cultural administrator, arts advocate, art critic, art centre/gallery director, artist	Mississauga, ON
2020	Deanna Bowen	Artistic Achievement	Interdisciplinary artist	Toronto, ON
2020	Dana Claxton	Artistic Achievement	Artist	Vancouver, BC
2020	Ruth Cuthand	Artistic Achievement	Artist	Saskatoon, SK
2020	Michael Fernandes	Artistic Achievement	Visual artist	East Dover, NS
2020	Ken Lum	Artistic Achievement	Visual artist	Philadelphia, PA, United States
2020	Jorge Lozano Lorza	Artistic Achievement	Filmmaker	Toronto, ON
2021	Bryce Kanbara	Outstanding Contribution	Visual artist and curator	Hamilton, ON
2021	Lori Blondeau	Artistic Achievement	Visual artist	Winnipeg, MB
2021	Germaine Arnaktauyok	Artistic Achievement	Visual artist	Yellowknife, NT
2021	Dempsey Bob	Artistic Achievement	Artist, sculptor	Terrace, BC
2021	Luc Courchesne	Artistic Achievement	Media artist	Montréal, QC
2021	Bonnie Devine	Artistic Achievement	Visual artist	Toronto, ON
2021	Cheryl L'Hirondelle	Artistic Achievement	Interdisciplinary artist	Saskatoon, SK
2022	Gerald McMaster	Outstanding Contribution	Curator, artist, writer	Toronto, ON
2022	Moyra Frances Davey	Artistic Achievement	Visual artist	New York City, NY
2022	Jocelyn Robert	Artistic Achievement	Artist	Québec City, QC
2022	Carole Condé and Karl Beveridge	Artistic Achievement	Visual artists	Toronto, ON
2022	David Ruben Piqtoukun	Artistic Achievement	Sculptor/artist	Plainfield, ON
2022	Monique Régimbald-Zeiber	Artistic Achievement	Visual artist	Montréal, QC
2022	Pierre Bourgault	Artistic Achievement	Visual artist	Saint-Jean-Port-Joli, QC
2023	David Garneau	Outstanding Contribution	Visual artist, curator, critical art writer	Regina, SK
2023	Evergon	Artistic Achievement	Gay politico and eroticist working in lens-based art	Montréal, QC
2023	FASTWÜRMS	Artistic Achievement	Visual artists	Mulmur, ON
2023	Germaine Koh	Artistic Achievement	Artist	Vancouver, BC
2023	Shannon Walsh	Artistic Achievement	Filmmaker	Vancouver, BC
2023	Tim Whiten	Artistic Achievement	Image maker and creator of cultural objects	Toronto, ON
2023	Nettie Wild	Artistic Achievement	Filmmaker	Vancouver, BC

=== Saidye Bronfman Award ===
Year	Name	Field	Location
1977	Robin Hopper	Potter	Metchosin, BC
1978	Lois Etherington Betteridge	Silversmith	Guelph, ON
1979	Monique Cliche-Spénard	Quilt artist	St-Joseph-de-Beauce, QC
1980	Doucet-Saito (Louise Doucet and Satoshi Saito)	Ceramic artists	
1981	Joanna Staniszkis	Textile artist	Vancouver, BC
1982	Micheline Beauchemin	Painter-weaver	Les Grondines, QC
1983	Wayne Ngan	Potter	Hornby Island, BC
1984	William Hazzard	Wood carver	Regina, SK
1985	Michael Wilcox	Bookbinder	Woodview, ON
1986	Bill Reid	Metalsmith, wood carver, jeweller	Vancouver, BC
1987	Carole Sabiston	Fibre artist	Victoria, BC
1988	Lutz Haufschild	Glass artist	West Vancouver, BC
1989	Harlan House	Potter	Marysville, ON
1990	Dorothy Caldwell	Textile artist	Hastings, ON
1991	Susan Warner Keene	Fibre artist	Toronto, ON
1992	Walter Dexter	Potter	Metchosin, BC
1993	Michael Fortune	Furniture designer and maker	Lindsay, ON
1994	Daniel Crichton	Glass artist	Toronto, ON
1995	Louise Genest	Bookbinder	Montreal, QC
1996	Steven Heinemann	Ceramic artist	Richmond Hill, ON
1997	William 'Grit' Laskin	Guitar maker	Toronto, ON
1998	Marcel Marois	Tapestry artist	Quebec, QC
1999	Susan Low-Beer	Sculptor	Toronto, ON
2000	Peter Fleming	Furniture designer and maker	Toronto, ON
2001	Léopold L. Foulem	Ceramic artist	Caraquet, NB and Montreal, QC
2002	Kai Chan	Textile artist	Toronto, ON
2003	Walter Ostrom	Ceramic artist	Indian Harbour, NS
2004	Maurice Savoie	Ceramist	Longueuil, QC
2005	Michael Hosaluk	Wood turner	Saskatoon, SK
2006	Peter Powning	Ceramist and sculptor	Markhamville, NB
2007	Paul Mathieu	Ceramist	Vancouver, BC
2008	Chantal Gilbert	Jeweller	Québec, QC
2009	Kevin Lockau	Glass sculptor	Bancroft, ON
2010	Ione Thorkelsson	Glass sculptor	Roseisle, MB
2011	Kye-Yeon Son	Metalsmith	Halifax, NS
2012	Charles Lewton-Brain	artist-goldsmith	Calgary, AB
2013	Greg Payce	Artist-potter	Calgary, AB
2014	Sandra Brownlee	Weaver/notebook keeper	Dartmouth, NS
2015	Paul McClure	Jewellery artist	Toronto, ON
2016	Jane Kidd	Textile artist	Salt Spring Island, BC
2017	Pamela Ritchie	Jewellery artist	Halifax, NS
2018	Jack Sures	Ceramic artist	Regina, SK
2019	Susan Edgerley	Glass artist	Val-Morin, QC
2020	Anna Torma	Visual artist	Baie Verte, NB
2021	Lou Lynn	Sculptor	Winlaw, BC
2022	Brigitte Clavette	Jeweller and metalsmith	Fredericton, NB
2023	Grace Nickel	Visual artist	Winnipeg, MB
