= Andrew J. Paterson =

Andrew J. Paterson (born 1952 in Toronto, Ontario) is a Canadian inter-disciplinary artist, working with video, live performance, original text, film, and music. Paterson is also a published author and editor, who sees his multidisciplinary activities as existing parallel to his media-art practice.

During the 1980s, he was the singer, songwriter and guitarist for the Toronto punk band The Government, which released several records and appeared in video work by Paterson, as well as other video artists.

Paterson is also an actor who has appearing in numerous videos and films, such as Boy, Girl by Bruce LaBruce and Zero Patience by John Greyson.

Controlled Environments, from 1994 is one of his many works on video.

Paterson's MONO LOGICAL is a series of seven monologues, plus clips from his narrative and performance-based video works (from the early eighties up until the early nineties). These clips are presented in tandem with his shorter digital new-media works and his more recent Super-8 tone poems. Paterson's media works, tapes, and films combine photographic tracking shots, montages of mediated found images, and voice-over discourses concerning urban space, global economics, and sexual possibilities. MONO LOGICAL plays on the tensions between language intended to be communicative and language that isn't. An academic, student, poet, police officer, entrepreneur, musician, and cleric all either lecture or perform. Their theatrical trappings might beg their sincerity, but their orations are to be taken very seriously. MONO LOGICAL throws curve balls and suggest parallel U-turns.

Paterson is also the writer of numerous critical articles and co-editor of Money Value Art: State Funding, Free Markets, Big Pictures, with Sally McKay. The book addresses the traditionally polar relationships between state subsidization and private sector competition relation to the arts. Other Media Works by Paterson include: Cash and Carry [1999], Etiquette [from Controlled Environments] [1994], How Many Fingers? [1981], The Headmaster's Ritual [2002/03], Snowjob [2001], The Walking Philosopher [1999/2001], and Who Killed Professor Wordsworth? [1990].

== Awards ==
- Governor General's Award in Visual and Media Arts (2019)
