= Scott Watson (curator) =

Canadian curator and professor based in Vancouver, BC (born 1950)

- Born: Donald Scott Watson; 1950 (age 75–76)
- Education: BA, MA (UBC)
- Known for: curator, writer

Scott Watson (born 1950) is a Canadian curator, writer, and researcher based in Vancouver, British Columbia. Watson was the Director/Curator of the Morris and Helen Belkin Art Gallery at the University of British Columbia from 1995 to 2021. As faculty in the Department of Art History, Visual Art and Theory at the University of British Columbia, he helped initiate the Critical Curatorial Studies program at UBC in September 2002. Through his research and publications, he has acted as a champion of contemporary Vancouver artists.

== Career ==
Watson was trained in art history and received his BA and MA at UBC. He was initially a fiction writer and published two books, "Stories" (1974) and "Platonic Love" (1981). In 1980, he was hired by the Vancouver Art Gallery. In 1985, he curated the Young Romantics painting exhibition and in 1990, published a monograph on Jack Shadbolt. In 1989, he was hired by the University of British Columbia (UBC) gallery. In 1995, he became the first director/curator of the gallery. He retired in 2021.

== Curatorial projects and research ==
Watson's research and curation focuses primarily around topics related to contemporary art, art theory and criticism, twentieth-century art history, and curatorial studies. His curatorial projects have appeared across Canada including at the Vancouver Art Gallery, Morris and Helen Belkin Art Gallery, and Artspeak in Vancouver and internationally in Berlin, Antwerp, and London.

== Notable curatorial projects ==
- Queer Landscapes (1991) at Artspeak
- Thrown: Influences and Intentions (2004) of West Coast Ceramics such as Wayne Ngan
- Rebecca Belmore: Fountain (2005) for the Venice Biennale Canadian Pavilion
- Intertidal: Vancouver art & artists (2005-2006) at the Museum of Contemporary Art in Antwerp
- Stan Douglas: Inconsolable Memories (2005-2006) at the Tate Modern
- Exponential Future (2008) at the Morris and Helen Belkin Art Gallery
- Jack Shadbolt: Underpinnings (2009) at the Morris and Helen Belkin Art Gallery
- Mark Boulos (2010), a solo exhibition at the Morris and Helen Belkin Art Gallery
- Letters: Michael Morris and Concrete Poetry (2012) at the Morris and Helen Belkin Art Gallery
- Image Bank (2019) at the KW Institute for Contemporary Arts

== Selected publications ==
- Polaroids : photographs by Attila Richard Lukacs. Vancouver: Arsenal Pulp Press. 2009.
- Mark Boulos. Vancouver: Morris and Helen Belkin Art Gallery. 2012.
- Tom Burrows. Vancouver: Figure 1 Publishing. 2018.
- Maria Eichhorn : Film Lexicon of Sexual Practices : Prohibited Imports. Köln and Vancouver: Verlag der Buchhandlung Walther König and Morris and Helen Belkin Art Gallery. 2019.

== Awards and honours ==
- an invitation to the UBC Chancellor's Circle (2005).
- UBC Dorothy Somerset Award for Performance Development in the Visual and Performing Arts (2005)
- Alvin Balkind Award for Creative Curatorship in British Columbia Arts (2008)
- Hnatyshyn Foundation Award for Curatorial Excellence in Contemporary Art (2010)
