= Suzanne Lafont =

French photographer

Suzanne Lafont (born 1949) is a French photographer.

== Life and career ==
In 1992, she had a solo exhibition titled Projects 37: Suzanne Lafont at the Museum of Modern Art in New York.

Her work is included in the collections of the National Gallery of Canada, the Metropolitan Museum of Art, the Fonds régional d'art contemporain Pays de la Loire and Lorraine, the Museo Reina Sofia, Madrid, among others.

She has participated to Documenta IX and Documenta X.

Lafont was born in Nîmes. She is represented by Erna Hecey Gallery in Luxembourg.

== Selected publications ==
- Jean Francois Chevrier, Interview with Christsian Milovanoff, Suzanne Lafont : 1984-1988. Marseille: Musées de Marseille, Arles: Actes Sud, 1989, ISBN 978-2-86869-384-6
- Jean-François Chevrier, Catherine David, Suzanne Lafont. Paris: Galerie nationale du Jeu de paume, 1992 ISBN 978-2-908901-09-2
- Chantal Pontbriand, Suzanne Lafont, Rochechouart: Musée départemental d'art contemporain de Rochechouart, 1997 ISBN 978-2-911540-02-8
- Paul Sztulman, Suzanne Lafont. Paris: éd. Hazan, 1998 ISBN 978-2-850256387
- L, lecture : 46 épisodes. Arles: Actes Sud, 2001 ISBN 978-2-7427-3647-8
- Marie de Brugerolle, Suzanne Lafont, Appelé par son nom. Arles: Actes Sud, 2003 ISBN 2-7427-4396-0
- Marcella Lista, Suzanne Lafont : Situations. La Garenne Colombes: Bernard Chauveau Editeur, 2015. ISBN 978-236306-142-3
