= Jane Kidd (artist) =

Canadian artist (born 1952)

- Born: 1952 (age 72–73); Victoria, British Columbia, Canada
- Known for: Tapestry artist
- Awards: Saidye Bronfman Award; 2016; Alberta Craft Council Award of Excellence; 2008
- Elected: Royal Canadian Academy of Art; 2001
- Website: www.janekidd.net

Jane Kidd RCA (born 1952) is a Canadian textile artist based out of Salt Spring Island, Canada.

== Biography ==
Kidd studied at the University of Victoria and Vancouver School of Art. She taught in the Fibre program of the Alberta College of Art and Design from 1979 to 2010, and was recognized as Lecturer Emeritus in 2013. Kidd has presented on her work at the Canadian Crafts Federation Symposium and The Textile Society of America Symposium.

Kidd received the Alberta Craft Council Award of Excellence in 2008, and in 2016 won the Governor General's Award in Visual and Media Arts Saidye Bronfman Award for her contribution to fine craft. Her tapestry works are in the permanent collections of the Glenbow Museum, the Canada Council Art Bank, and the Canadian Museum of Civilization. She is a member of the Royal Canadian Academy of Arts.

While originally educated in modernist aesthetics, Kidd's primary medium is hand-woven tapestry. Her work explores historical and contemporary issues such as material culture, the handmade, and the environment.

=== Selected works ===
- Land Sentence
- Handwork Series: to the bone, in the blood, from the heart (fragments 1-9)
- Wonderland Series
- Possession Series
- Curiosities
