= Charles Gagnon =

Canadian artist (1934–2003)

- Born: May 23, 1934; Montreal, Quebec
- Died: April 16, 2003 (aged 68); Montreal, Quebec
- Education: Parsons School of Design; New York School of Interior Design; New York University evening classes with Paul Brach
- Known for: Painting, photography, film
- Spouse: Michiko Yajima (m. 1960)
- Awards: Governor General's Award in Visual and Media Arts (2002)

Charles Gagnon (May 23, 1934 – April 16, 2003) was a multidisciplinary artist known for his painting, photography and film.

== Career ==
Charles Gagnon was born and grew up in Montreal. He studied graphic art and interior design at Parsons School of Design, New York, then went on to the New York School of Interior Design. He also attended New York University evening classes, studying with Paul Brach (1955–1960). The city's flourishing experimental avant-garde fascinated him and contributed to the development of his approach: He was in New York during the time when artists Robert Rauschenberg and Jasper Johns were detaching themselves from Abstract Expressionism. During those years, stimulated by the Egyptian wing of the Metropolitan Museum, as well as by British painters he saw in New York, and by the city itself, particularly its signs and the worn-out surfaces of some of its buildings, he was a painter and photographer. Later, he was to call himself a member of the New York School of Montreal, although no such school ever existed.

When he returned to Montreal, he began to produce not only paintings but box-like constructions. He had begun incorporating letters and numbers into his paintings in New York, but now began to create large square and rectangular chromatic fields that seem to nestle into one another. Their arrangement fragmented the composition, creating window-like openings. The particular interest of this series, entitled Gap Paintings, lies in the spatial ambiguity caused by the interplay of formal opposites – between the straight line and splashes of paint or gestural strokes, between the flatness of the coloured surfaces and the sense of depth created by their superimposition. The Gap series (1962–1963) also had a landscape dimension, as suggested by green areas and vistas into the pictorial space.

Following this series, Gagnon developed the idea of contrasting surfaces and materials. He also made silkscreen prints, audio collage and experimental film. His painting can be seen mostly as falling within several major periods: the white paintings (1967–1969), the Markers / Marqueurs (1973–1974), the Splitscreenspace series (1976 to 1983) and the word paintings (1986 to 1990). Gagnon also worked in photography, especially in the late 1970s. In the 1990s, he alternated between photography and painting, until he combined both. As one art historian wrote, his art is a confirmation that painting can be at once "abstract, representational, figurative, and conceptual".

Gagnon had a number of retrospectives and solo and group exhibitions during his lifetime. The Musée d'art contemporain de Montréal showed his overall body of work in 2001. In 2000, the Canadian Museum of Contemporary Photography, and the National Gallery of Canada, Ottawa held a show of his photography; and in 2004, the National Gallery of Canada had a show of his work. His work is in many public galleries, including the National Gallery of Canada.

Gagnon began his teaching career at Loyola College (now Concordia University) in Montreal. In 1975, he entered the Department of Visual Arts at the University of Ottawa, where he taught photography and media arts until his retirement in 1996.

He died of a stroke in Montreal on April 16, 2003. The Charles Gagnon Master of Fine Arts Admission Scholarship was established in 2004 by the Department of Visual Arts, University of Ottawa after his death.

== Awards ==
- Governor General's Award in Visual and Media Arts (2002)

== Personal life ==
Gagnon's daughter is writer, cultural critic, curator, and educator Monika Kin Gagnon, whose work explores race, ethnicity, and gender in media, alternative media, and the cultural effects of globalization. More recently, she has also engaged in projects surrounding the world exhibition Expo '67.

== Legacy ==
In 2025, "Charles Gagnon: The Colour of Time, the Sound of Space", with essays by Roald Nasgaard, Olivier Asselin and Michiko Yajima Gagnon, edited by Monika Kin Gagnon was published by Figure 1 Publishing.
