= Carol Wainio =

Canadian painter (born 1955)

- Born: 1955 (age 70–71); Sarnia, Ontario, Canada
- Education: Nova Scotia College of Art and Design, University of Toronto, Concordia University
- Known for: Painter
- Awards: George Gilmour Award (1985), Royal Canadian Academy of Arts Academician award (2004), Governor General's Awards in Visual and Media Arts (2014)

Carol Wainio RCA (born 1955) is a Canadian painter. Her work, known for its visual complexity and monochrome color palette, has been exhibited in major art galleries in Canada, the U.S., Europe and China. She has won multiple awards, including the Governor General's Award in Visual and Media Arts.

== Life ==
Born in Sarnia, Ontario, Wainio is the daughter of Finnish immigrants, she grew up in Kitchener-Waterloo, Ontario. Wainio studied at the Nova Scotia College of Art and Design and at the University of Toronto and later completed a Master of Fine Arts at Concordia University in Montreal, Quebec. She lives in Ottawa and is an adjunct professor in visual arts at the University of Ottawa.

== Painting career ==
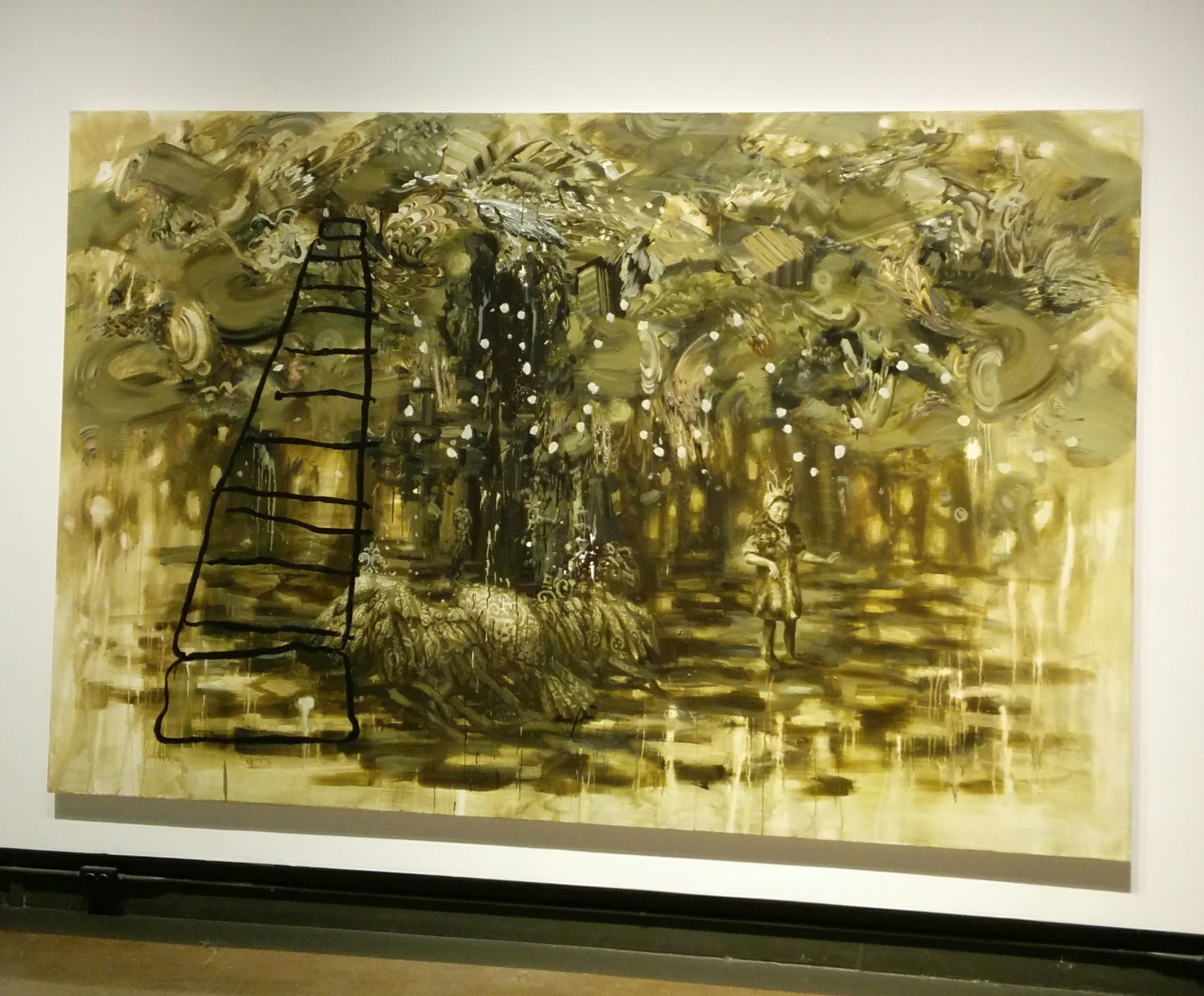
Wainio's Season's End (2012) on display at the Kitchener-Waterloo Art Gallery as part of the 2016 exhibition Stilled Lives: Works from the Permanent Collection.

Her paintings often refer to a variety of sources from fairy tales and medieval manuscripts to the 2008 financial collapse. Wainio's canvases have been described by art critic Emily Falvey as "fairy-tale landscapes littered with the detritus of contemporary consumerism." Her body of work has been compared to such works by American painter Jules Olitski. "The appeal her paintings had came from the same activity of looking that generated their strangeness."

Wainio's first solo exhibition took place at the Yarlow/Salzman Gallery, in Toronto, Ontario in 1982. In 1990, her paintings were displayed in the "Aperto" exhibit at the Venice Biennale, in Venice, Italy. In 2010, Wainio's work was featured in a travelling exhibition, Carol Wainio: The Book, curated by Diana Nemiroff and organized and circulated by Carleton University Art Gallery. This exhibition displays Wainio's interest in the evolution of fairy-tales, the art of the copyist, industrialization, and the narrative power of images. It was on display at Carleton University Art Gallery (2010), the Varley Art Gallery (2011), the Kelowna Art Gallery (2013), the Dunlop Art Gallery (2013), the McIntosh Gallery (2013), and the Galerie de l'UQAM (2014). In 2024, she had her first solo show in New York at Arsenal Contemporary Art Gallery.

Wainio's large-scale canvases have also been exhibited in more than 40 museums and galleries, including the National Gallery of Canada, the Shanghai Art Museum in China and the Stedelijk Museum in the Netherlands. Her work is in such public collections as the National Gallery of Canada, the Musée d'art contemporain de Montréal and the Art Gallery of Ontario, among other institutions.

== Awards ==
In 2004, Wainio became one of the few women elected to the Royal Canadian Academy of Arts. Along with other eight Canadian artists, she received the Governor General's Award in Visual and Media Arts in 2014 for her outstanding achievements in contemporary visual and media arts.

== Exhibitions ==
=== Solo ===
- S.L. Simpson Gallery, Toronto, 1991
- Galerie Chantal Boulanger, Montréal, 1990
- Galerie d'art du Centre Culturel de l'Université de Sherbrooke, 1989
- "Imagining the past/Remembering the Future", S.L. Simpson Gallery, Toronto, 1985
- Concordia University Art Gallery, Montréal, 1983
- Yarlow/Salzman Gallery, Toronto, 1982
- Eye Level Gallery, Halifax, 1980

=== Group ===
- "Aperto", Venice Biennale, 1990
- "Les Temps Chauds", Musée d'art contemporain, Montréal, 1988
- "Songs of Experience", National Gallery of Canada, Ottawa, 1986
- "Appearing", Mount Saint Vincent University Art Gallery, Halifax, 1983
