= Robin Hopper =

Canadian ceramist (1939–2017)

- Born: April 23, 1939; England
- Died: April 6, 2017 (aged 77); Victoria, British Columbia, Canada

Robin Hopper CM RCA (23 April 1939 – 6 April 2017) was a Canadian ceramist, potter, teacher, author, garden designer and arts activist.

== Career ==
Hopper was born in England in 1939, and died April 6, 2017, in Victoria, British Columbia. He trained in pottery and ceramics at the Croydon College of Art from 1956 to 1961. In 1968 he emigrated to Canada. He spent the first two years teaching at the Toronto Central Technical School. He began his post-secondary educational career in 1970 at Georgian College, Barrie, Ontario where he founded and became head of the Ceramics and Glass Department. He resigned his post in 1972 to devote his time to his ceramics work. He relocated to Victoria, British Columbia 1977 to operate the family's 'Chosin Pottery Gallery'.

He was a founding member and president emeritus of the Metchosin International Summer School of the Arts. Hopper's work in ceramics includes a great deal of ceramic historical and technical research. Next to ceramics, his other lifelong interest was gardening, particularly the development of his oriental garden. His fonds is in the University of Victoria Libraries, Special Collections and University Archives.

== Work ==
Hopper had both a functional and a decorative side to his production of pottery and ceramic works. His functional works were produced on an artizan basis. His production of functional pottery was by hand craftsmanship for individual pieces of a like design. He wrote several books on the subject of functional pottery. This craftsmanship had a particular application in ceramic works, many of which were one of a kind pieces for artistic exhibition. In these works he used a combination of glazing techniques. These were mainly porcelain decorative plates but he also created specialty items such as glaze paintings. A number of these works reflect the northern imagery of Canada.

== Academic and instructional positions ==
He taught throughout Canada, and in England, The United States, Australia, New Zealand, China, Korea, Japan and Israel.

== Selected collections ==
His ceramic work is in public, corporate and private collections throughout the world. These collections include:

- The Bronfman Collection, Montreal, Canada
- The Greater Victoria Art Gallery, Victoria, Canada
- The University of Victoria Legacy Art Galleries, Victoria, Canada

== Awards ==
Robin Hopper was honoured for his contributions to the arts and public activities.

- He was the first recipient of the Saidye Bronfman Award, 1977, Canada’s most prestigious annual award in the crafts.
- Granted honorary member of the National Council on Education for Ceramic Arts.
- Member, Royal Canadian Academy of Arts
- Member, Order of Canada, 2017

== Garden ==
His interest in artistic gardens led to the creation of the Anglojapanadian Garden at ’Chosin Pottery. This garden at Metchosin, British Columbia has been the subject of publications and television programs.

== See also ==
List of Canadian artists
