= John Scott (Canadian artist) =

Canadian artist (1950-2022)

- Born: May 11, 1950; Windsor, Ontario, Canada
- Died: February 17, 2022 (aged 71); Toronto, Ontario, Canada
- Education: Ontario College of Art; Rochdale College, University of Toronto; Centennial College, Toronto (1972-1976)
- Awards: Inaugural Governor General's Award in Visual and Media Arts, 2000

John Scott (May 11, 1950 – February 17, 2022) was a Canadian multimedia painter, sculptor, and installation artist.

== Early life ==
Born in 1950 in Windsor, Ontario, Scott began working in a factory on assembly lines at 15 to support his family, later becoming sensitized to the local labour movement and larger political issues. One writer who knew him at the time says he was a street artist. Scott followed his brother to Toronto, and after some time spent at Rochdale College, University of Toronto and elsewhere, eventually landed at the Ontario College of Art in 1972, at the tail end of a tumultuous time when the school, as Scott said, was changing to a more conceptual, rather than a didactic, approach. "It was great. It was a complete mess," Scott recalled. Scott never finished his studies but transitioned into running the school's gallery. From there, Scott said, he "sort of gradually slipped in" to teaching. He was a professor in the Faculty of Art, primarily in the Drawing and Painting program. In 2019, he retired after 38 years.

== Career ==
Scott's graphic drawings in black paint and charcoal with their deliberately childlike motifs, hand and boot marks and misspellings are his signature, along with his Trans-Am Apocalypse No. 2 (1993), a black, modified Pontiac Trans Am car that has text scratched into its surface from the Bible's Book of Revelation of St. John the Evangelist (National Gallery of Canada). (There is also a version in the Art Gallery of Ontario collection). Among his themes are power, class, industrialization, and fear. In 1982, he said that he believed all art has the potential for social and political change.

Few artists in Canada have protested war in their art as single-mindedly as Scott did. In the large, bleak drawing Second Strike, he made clear his objections to American cruise missile testing in Canada.

His work first came to critical attention in 1976 in a group show at Sable-Castelli Gallery in Toronto. His first solo show was at Carmen Lamanna Gallery in Toronto in 1981. From the time of his early work, he has used images of skull-like bunny-man figures and technology in his drawings. Around 2005, he began using a figure he called Dark Commander, a sad jokey Napoleon-like cartoon to represent evil.

The works he created could be unique. For instance, for a Holocaust memorial work in 1989, he had a seven-digit number, similar to victims of Nazi concentration camps, and a rose tattooed on his inner thigh. He then had this section of skin surgically removed. The drying skin was then displayed in a raised glass case at the entrance to the exhibition. He called this work Selbst.

Scott's work has been the subject of numerous solo exhibitions and included in many group shows, both in Canada and abroad, including a 12-year retrospective titled John Scott: Edge City, curated by Joan Murray for the Robert McLaughlin Gallery in Oshawa in 1994, and in 1997, John Scott: Engines of Anxiety, a two-venue solo exhibition curated by David Liss at the Gallery of the Saidye Bronfman Centre for the Arts and the Montreal Museum of Fine Arts. These shows culminated in Dark Commander: The Art of John Scott, a 40-year retrospective organized by associate director Daniel Strong for The Falconer Gallery at Grinnell College in Iowa in 2014 with a major, 50-page book catalogue. This two-part exhibition travelled to McMaster Museum of Art (the first half) and the Art Gallery of Hamilton (the second half) in 2015–2016.

His work is in the collections of the Museum of Modern Art, New York, the National Gallery of Canada, Ottawa, and many other institutions. In 2002, he co-authored Shiva's Really Scary Gifts of his cocktail napkin drawings, with Ann MacDonald of the Doris McCarthy Gallery, Toronto.

In 2000, Scott was awarded the inaugural Governor General's Award in Visual and Media Arts. He is represented by the Nicholas Metivier Gallery.

Scott died in Toronto, Ontario, on February 17, 2022, at the age of 71.

== Legacy ==
John Scott: Firestorm, guest curated by John O'Brian, presented the work made by Scott from the 1980s through the 2010s at the McMichael Canadian Art Collection in 2024.
