= Carole Condé =

Canadian photographer (1940–2024)

- Born: Carole Bernice Conde; June 27, 1940; Hamilton, Ontario, Canada
- Died: July 19, 2024 (aged 84); Toronto, Ontario, Canada
- Known for: Photographer
- Website: Official website

Carole Condé D.F.A. (June 27, 1940 – July 19, 2024) was a Canadian artist whose practice responds to critical contemporary cultural, social, and political issues through the use of collaboration and dialogue. Condé and long-time collaborator and partner Karl Beveridge challenged concepts of ideology, power, and control. In their career, which spanned over thirty years, Condé and Beveridge have had over fifty solo exhibitions at major museums and art spaces across four continents, including: the Institute of Contemporary Arts in London, UK; Museum Folkswang in Germany; the George Meany Centre in Washington; Dazibao Gallery in Montréal; Centro Cultural Recoleta in Buenos Aires; the Art Gallery of Alberta; and the Australian Centre for Photography in Sydney.

== Background ==
In 1969, Condé and Beveridge, then working as independent conceptual artists, left Toronto for the burgeoning conceptual art world in New York City, where they found their overtly politicized voice. In 1975, they picketed at the Museum of Modern Art, protesting its lack of inclusion of women artists. The couple returned to Toronto in 1977.

Condé died on July 19, 2024, at the age of 84.

== Artistic career ==
Condé and Beveridge have worked on social issues including the working conditions of migrant farm labourers, the histories of auto workers, women in the workplace, projects relating to labour education and labour arts, national and global "free trade" agreements, police brutality and systemic racism, environmental issues, nuclear power, the decline of the fishing industry, struggles against neoconservative government policies, healthcare issues, anti-globalization protests, and the transnational politics of water. The artists used dialogical aesthetics as a way of breaking down the conventional distinctions between artist, artwork, and audience.

The artists have been important advocates for artist-run centres in Canada, which give smaller curators and photographers working outside of traditional institutions a chance to speak. Condé and Beveridge were key figures in the Workers Arts and Heritage Centre in Hamilton, Ontario. As part of their artistic advocacy, Condé and Beveridge worked closely with artist unions and CARFAC to advocate for fair copyright and compensation for artists working in Canada.

== Style ==
Condé and Beveridge utilized actors, staged tableaux, montage, thematic slogans, captions, and the construction of emblematic props and non-naturalistic sets to generate an atmosphere of serious visual expression grounded in theoretical and ethical contexts. Their work expressed the fundamental principle that art is a social transaction that becomes a participatory, collaborative process, communicating and articulating commonalities and differences shared by all.

== Selected artworks ==
- 2012 – Public Matters 2012 - A photographic series that explores the reality of women's work over the last hundred years.
- 1982–83 – Oshawa—A History of CAW Local 222 – A collaboration with members of the Canadian Auto Workers Local 222 (at the time still a part of the US-based United Auto Workers), which investigated the changing role of women in both the workplace and the union. The 56-part photo narrative, divided into 5 sections, utilized oral and photo history to express the 1937 founding of the union, World War II changes, post-war growth and stability, gender tensions which resulted from the introduction of women into non-traditional jobs during the 1970s, and the looming threats of technology felt in 1984.
- 1976 – It's Still a Privileged Art – This seminal artwork, their first key collaboration, initiated the development of the artists’ unique form of socially engaged art practice.

== Selected exhibitions ==
- 2019 – Oshawa: A History of Local 222 – Robert McLaughlin Gallery, Oshawa, ON.
- 2018 – Winds of Change: Carole Condé and Karl Beveridge – Durham Art Gallery, Durham, ON.
- 2016 – I stood before the source – Blackwood Gallery, Mississauga, ON.
- 2015 – Carole Condé and Karl Beveridge: Scene Otherwise – Khyber Centre for the Arts/Anna Leonowens Gallery, Halifax, NS.
- 2012 – Open Conversations: The Art Practice of Carole Condé and Karl Beveridge - Richmond Art Gallery, Richmond, BC.
- 2009 – Carole Condé and Karl Beveridge: Working Culture – Art Gallery of Windsor, Windsor, ON.

== Selected publications ==
- 1998 – Carole Condé & Karl Beveridge: Political Landscapes – Investigates the strategies employed in the artists’ tableau photographs, which centre around the collapse of the cod fishery, strikes by union workers and activism by students, teachers, etc.
- 1986 – First Contract: Women and the Fight to Unionize – Focusing on working women and how women, more than men, have been forced to confront the interconnection of work and life after work. Although originally conceived as true documentary, the project used fictionalized accounts and actors after fears of employer reprisals arose.

== Selected film/video ==
- 2011 – Portrait of Resistance: The Art and Activism of Carole Condé and Karl Beveridge – Intimately captured the artistic duo as they created their provocative and powerfully political staged photographs.

== Awards ==
- 2010 – Honorary Doctorate, Ontario College of Art and Design/OCAD University, Toronto, ON.
- 2015 – Honorary Doctorate, Nova Scotia College of Art and Design/NSCAD University, Halifax, NS.
- 2022 (with Karl Beveridge) Governor General's Awards in Visual and Media Arts

== Collections ==
- Canadian Museum of Contemporary Photography, Ottawa, ON.
- National Gallery of Canada, Ottawa, ON.
- The Art Gallery of Ontario, Toronto, ON.
- Ontario Arts Council, Toronto, ON.
- Library and Archives Canada (National Photography Collection), Ottawa, ON.
- Canada Council Art Bank, Ottawa, ON.
- Toronto Photographers Workshop, Toronto, ON.
- Morris and Helen Belkin Art Gallery/University of British Columbia, Vancouver, BC.
- Winnipeg Art Gallery, Winnipeg, MB.

== Archives ==
There is a Carole Condé and Karl Beveridge fonds at Library and Archives Canada. The archival reference number is R9079. The fonds covers the date range 1980 to 1984. It consists of 40 audio cassettes, 71 photographs and 4.6 centimeters of textual records.
