= Monique Régimbald-Zeiber =

Canadian painter (born 1947)

- Born: April 24, 1947 (age 77); Sorel, Quebec, Canada
- Education: Moscow State University; McGill University 1975; Concordia University 1982
- Alma mater: McGill University 1980
- Known for: Painter
- Website: moniqueregimbaldzeiber.com

Monique Régimbald-Zeiber (born April 24, 1947) is a Canadian painter.

== Life and work ==
Monique Régimbald-Zeiber was born in Sorel, Quebec. From 1972 until 1973 she studied Russian literature at Moscow State University before returning to Canada to earn her master's degree in Russian and literature at McGill University in 1975, followed by a PhD in 1980. Two years later, she earned a Bachelor of Fine Arts in visual arts from Concordia University.

She lives and works in Montréal. In 1996, she co-founded a publishing house, Les Éditions les Petits Carnets, with Louise Déry. She was associate professor of painting at the University of Quebec at Montreal from 1992 to 2012. In 2010, she was included in a group exhibition titled "Expansion" and in 2012, "The Body in Question(s)", both at the University of Quebec. In 2017, she participated in the Musée d'art contemporain de Montréal's exhibition "That's how the light gets in" exhibition, which examined the use of light by artists. In 2020, the Musée Joliette held a retrospective of her work titled "Monique Régimbald-Zeiber. Of Works and Hours".

Régimbald-Zeiber explores the "relationship between the image and the written word" in her work. She also examines women's history, balancing between abstraction and figuration and combining literature and painting.

== Notable collections ==
- Les dessous de l’Histoire : Marguerite B., les écrits, 2002-2003, Musée national des beaux-arts du Québec
- Musée d’art contemporain de Montréal
- Galerie de l’UQAM

== Awards ==
- (2022) Governor General's Award in Visual and Media Arts
