= Bryce Kanbara =

Canadian artist

- Born: 1947; Hamilton, Ontario
- Education: B.A. in English literature and Art History (1971), McMaster University in Hamilton, Ontario
- Known for: artist, curator, activist

Bryce Kanbara (born 1947), who lives in Hamilton, Ontario, is a visual artist who creates paintings, prints and sculpture. As an artist and curator he places community art and public art projects at the centre of his practise. He was a founding member of Hamilton Artists Inc. and as a curator, has held positions at public galleries as well as founding the You Me Gallery in Hamilton, Ontario. He has curated shows such as Kazuo Nakamura: Tashme2 (2001) and was the Executive Director of the Toronto Chapter, National Association of Japanese Canadians, Chair of the NAJC Endowment Fund and National Executive member. In 2021, he won the Governor General's Awards in Visual and Media Arts for his "Outstanding Contribution".

== Career ==
Kanbara was born in Hamilton, Ontario and graduated from McMaster University with a B.A. in English literature and in Art History in 1971. Afterwards, he helped to found, and then was administrator and then board member (1975-1981) of Hamilton Artists' Inc., an artist-run centre that a small group of Hamilton artists started in the 1970s. During this time he was also the Hamilton representative and then Ontario spokesman for Canadian Artist Representation (CARFAC).

For the next three decades, he worked as an Exhibition Curator at the Art Gallery of Burlington (formerly the Burlington Cultural Centre) (in the late 1980s and early 1990s), as Visual Arts, Crafts & Design Officer for the Ontario Arts Council, and for the National Association of Japanese Canadians, Japanese Canadian Cultural Centre, the Art Gallery of Hamilton, as well as for the Glenhyrst Art Gallery of Brant. He has said these "job stints left me disillusioned about the public art system".

He has been director of the storefront private gallery, the You Me Gallery, located at 330 James Street North in Hamilton since 2003, a gallery that he intends to awaken the community to the "eye and mind-widening force of art". He has also served as the Co-chair of the Board of Directors of the Workers Arts & Heritage Centre; and on the Governing Council member for the Hamilton Centre for Civic Inclusion.

As a curator, he has contributed many shows such as Start Here: Kiyooka, Nakamura, Takashima, Tanabe (2022) in Victoria, BC which opened in conjunction with a national arts symposium organized by the National Association of Japanese Canadians (NAJC), in collaboration with the University of Victoria. He also was a consultant for the Art Gallery of Hamilton's exhibition The Bigger Picture (2022).

== Art work ==
Kanbara’s work as an artist is varied. His bird and "winged things" installation was on display around 2011 outside Hamilton Artists Inc. on James Street North. Some of his work is in the tradition of the merzbild of Kurt Schwitters but defter such as his work titled Grace in a show at Centre[3] for Artistic + Social Practice Presents in 2022 of his wall relief sculptures, a practice the artist began in the 1980s and continues to this day. The show was named after his first drywall sculpture.

Kanbara said of his work: [In my personal work, I] "combine two or more of the following: Japanese Canadian-ness, abstract expressionism, Hamilton, literature, a sense of communality."

== Honours and awards ==
In 2021, he was awarded the Governor General's Awards in Visual and Media Arts for his "Outstanding Contribution".
