= Barbara Steinman =

Canadian artist (born 1950)

- Born: February 3, 1950 (age 76); Montreal, Quebec, Canada
- Education: McGill University, Montreal
- Awards: Governor General’s Award in Visual and Media Arts (2002); Honorary Doctorate from Concordia University in Montreal (2015)

Barbara Steinman (born February 3, 1950) is a Canadian artist known for her work in video and installation art.

== Biography ==
Steinman was born in Montreal, Quebec, in 1950. She began her career as a pioneering videotape artist in Vancouver in the late seventies and evolved into creating elaborate video and multimedia installations. After returning to Montreal in 1980, her video sculptures and installations received international recognition and were included in major exhibitions and biennials. As in Vancouver, Steinman was involved with Montreal's video and alternate art production: she was co-director of Vidéo Véhicule, the centre for independent media arts production, and also a director of the artist-run La Centrale / Powerhouse Gallery.

A common theme in Steinman's work is the fate of the disenfranchised and the dispossessed. In 2019, Whitehot Magazine of Contemporary Art wrote that she "effectively memorialises subjects denied a common name, a concrete identity, a reasonable life." She works in multiple media, including video, photography, neon, and installation art.

== Exhibitions and commissions ==
Steinman's artworks have been shown in exhibitions in Canada and internationally, including the biennials of Seoul, Sydney, São Paulo and Aperto in Venice, as well as exhibitions at the Museum of Modern Art (MoMA) in New York, the Stedelijk Museum in Amsterdam, the Tate Liverpool in England, the Art Gallery of Ontario (AGO) in Toronto and the National Gallery of Canada. In 2021, she had a show of images of flowers in various stages of their life cycles titled Keeping Time at the Olga Korper Gallery in Toronto which represents her. She was inspired to start this subject as a way to mark the passage of time during a year of lockdown in Montreal caused by COVID-19 and then it became about time itself.

Her public art projects have received widespread recognition, including the award for Design Excellence for an outdoor public artwork in Vancouver (1998), a commissioned work for Canada House (Berlin) (2005), and the design of a featured artwork for the Canadian Embassy in Moscow (2010).

== Public collections ==
Her work is included in the collections of the Musée d'art contemporain de Montréal and the National Gallery of Canada. as well as in the Collection Fonds national d'art contemporain (FNAC), Paris; Maison européenne de la photographie, Paris; the Seoul Metropolitan Museum, Seoul; Musée national des beaux-arts du Québec; Art Gallery of Ontario, Toronto; the Montreal Museum of Fine Arts, Montréal; Canadian Centre for Architecture, Montréal; Canadian War Museum, Ottawa; Canada Council Art Bank, Ottawa; Musée national des beaux-arts du Québec, Québec; Museum London, London, Ontario; Art Gallery of Hamilton; MacKenzie Art Gallery, Regina; Vancouver Art Gallery; Winnipeg Art Gallery; Art Gallery of Windsor; Rare Books and Special Collections, McGill University, Montréal; and the Donovan Collection, St. Michael's College, University of Toronto, Toronto.

== Awards ==
Barbara Steinman received the Governor General's Award in Visual and Media Arts (2002) and was awarded an honorary doctorate from Concordia University in Montreal (2015). In 2022, she was awarded the Paul-Émile-Borduas Prize.
