= Susan Edgerley =

Canadian mixed-media artist

Susan Edgerley RCA (born 1960) is a Canadian artist known for her installation and sculptural works in glass and mixed media.

Her career began in 1984. In 2003, she was elected Honorary Member of the Royal Canadian Academy of Arts. In 2019 she was the recipient of the Saidye Bronfman Award, part of the Canadian Governor General's Awards in Visual and Media Arts.

Her work is included in the collection of the Montreal Museum of Fine Arts, the Canadian Museum of History and the Musée national des beaux-arts du Québec.
