= Micheline Beauchemin =

- Beauchemin in Kyoto, Japan, 1968
- Born: 24 October 1929; Longueuil, Quebec
- Died: 29 September 2009 (aged 79); Quebec
- Known for: Textile artist and weaver
- Awards: Order of Canada; National Order of Quebec

Micheline Beauchemin, OC, CQ, RCA (French pronunciation: [miʃlin boʃ(ə)mɛ̃]; 24 October 1929 – 29 September 2009) was a Canadian textile artist and weaver.

== Education ==
Beauchemin was born in Longueuil, Quebec. She studied at the Montréal's École des Beaux-Arts and the École des Beaux-Arts and Académie de la Grande Chaumière in Paris, France. In 1953, she held the first exhibit of her stained glass work in Chartres, France. A few years later, in 1955, she exhibited her first tapestries at the Palais des Beaux-Arts in Chartres. Micheline Beauchemin returned to Canada in 1957.

== Artistic career ==
While best known for her monumental tapestries and theatre curtains, she also worked with embroidery, stained glass, costumes and paintings. Some of Beauchemin's most famous works in Canada include the acrylic curtain that she made for the Grande Salle of the Théâtre Maisonneuve at Place des Arts in Montréal (1963–1967) and the stage curtain of the National Arts Centre in Ottawa (1966–1969). She was also commissioned to create tapestries for Queen's Park in Toronto (1968–1969), the social sciences building at York University (1970), the Hudson's Bay Company in Winnipeg (1970), the Canadian pavilion at the 1970 World Fair in Osaka, the Department of Revenue in Quebec and Pearson International Airport in Toronto.

== Honours ==
In 1973, she was made an Officer of the Order of Canada, the second level of Canada's highest civilian honour. In 1991, she was made a Knight of the National Order of Quebec, an order of merit bestowed by the government of Quebec. In 1970, she was elected to the Royal Canadian Academy of Arts. In 2006, she was awarded the Governor General's Award in Visual and Media Arts. In 2005, she was awarded the Quebec government's Prix Paul-Émile-Borduas, given to individuals who are artists or craftsman in the fields of visual arts, of the trades of art, architecture and the design.
