= Jean Le Moyne =

Canadian politician

The Honourable Jean Le Moyne OC

Senator for Rigaud senate division
- In office 1982–1988
- Appointed by: Pierre Trudeau
- Preceded by: Carl Goldenberg
- Succeeded by: Gérald Beaudoin

Personal details
- Born: February 17, 1913 Montreal, Quebec, Canada
- Died: April 1, 1996 (aged 83) Montreal, Quebec, Canada
- Party: Liberal
- Spouse: Suzanne Rivard-Lemoyne

Jean Le Moyne, OC (February 17, 1913 – April 1, 1996) was a Canadian theologian, journalist, social theorist, and screenwriter. He was appointed to the Senate of Canada in 1982.

Born in Montreal, Quebec, in 1961 he wrote Convergences, a collection of essays, which won him the 1961 Governor General's Award for French non-fiction. An English translation appeared in 1966. He won the Molson Prize in 1968.

In the mid-1960s Le Moyne, as a humanist, was interested in "the importance of developing a philosophically grounded approach to science and technology". His work in radio and television documentary during this period attests to this. One project with Claude Jutra, the documentary Comment savoir (1966), examined the role of technology in education.

In 1968 he moved from Montreal to Ottawa to work as a speechwriter and advisor for Pierre Trudeau, the recently elected Prime Minister of Canada.

On December 23, 1982 he was appointed to the Senate on Trudeau's recommendation, representing the senatorial division of Rigaud, Quebec. He retired on his 75th birthday on February 17, 1988. He sat as a Liberal.

In 1982, he was made an Officer of the Order of Canada "in recognition of his important contribution to Canadian humanities".
