= COZIC =

Canadian artist duo

COZIC is a Canadian artist duo composed of Monic Brassard (born Nicolet, Quebec, 1944) and Yvon Cozic (born 1942, Saint-Servan, France). They were the province's first artist duo. They hoped to engage the public in the experience of their work by creating a tactile object. To this end, they used vinyl, plastic and other industrial materials, along with plush and feathers in their "sculpture-objects".

The Musée national des beaux-arts du Québec presented a retrospective of their work in 2019. It was titled COZIC: over to You from 1967 to Now.

In 2019 the pair received the Canadian Governor General's Award in Visual and Media Arts. Their work is included in the collection of the Montreal Museum of Contemporary Art and the Musée national des beaux-arts du Québec.
