= Bruce Eves =

Canadian artist

Bruce Eves (born 1952) is a Canadian artist. Throughout his career Eves has involved himself with performance, curatorial, and archival projects. Currently his work concentrates of conceptually-driven photo-based works.

== Career ==
During the 1970s, Eves was the assistant-director of programming for The Centre for Experimental Art and Communication (CEAC) in Toronto, Ontario and played a central role in two European performance art tours touching down everywhere from Aalst to Zagreb. He also had a presence at Documenta 6, working with Joseph Beuys and his Free International University at the Fridericianum in Kassel.

From 1980 to 1988, against the background of the first wave of the AIDS pandemic, Eves was co-founder and chief archivist of the International Gay History Archive (now housed in the Rare Books and Manuscript division of the New York Public Library). The collection played a featured role in the library's groundbreaking 1994 exhibition "Becoming Visible."

After this Eves resumed his art practice and in 2018 he was both a recipient of Canadian art's highest honour, the Governor General's Awards in Media and Visual Arts, and was the subject of a feature-length documentary "Bruce Eves in Polari" directed by the Canadian filmmaker Peter Dudar. The film received its premiere at The Power Plant in Toronto. In 2019 Eves found himself ranked 26th on the Alt-Power100 list compiled by ArtLyst, which is based in London (UK).

His work is included in the collection of the Museum of Modern Art, New York.

== Awards ==
- Governor General's Awards in Visual and Media Arts, 2018.
