= Raymond Gervais =

Canadian artist (born 1946)

- Born: 1946; Montreal, Quebec, Canada
- Died: January 6, 2018 (aged 71–72)
- Known for: avant-garde conceptual artist
- Spouse: Chantal Pontbriand

Raymond Gervais (1946 – January 06, 2018) was an avant-garde conceptual artist in Montreal, who was also a sound artist; a performance artist; and an author. His installations explored notions of time, language, sound and silence, often taking music as a starting point. He was as interested in the apparatus of music as much as music itself. In 2014, he won the Governor General’s Award in Visual and Media Arts.

== Early years ==
Gervais was born in Montreal, Quebec, into a musical family and has written a memoir about his early influences. As a child, he was introduced to classical music, opera and Jazz along with hearing his mother playing the piano. In 1973, he co-founded the Atelier de musique expérimentale and in 1976, he began writing about music in Parachute magazine (founded 1975) and later served on the editorial board for 20 years. In the 1980s he worked for CBC/Radio Canada.

== Work ==
Gervais began creating visual arts installations and performances in 1973. In 1975 he produced a video titled Commencer par / puisqu'à toute fin (Start With / Since at any End Corresponds), in which he analyzed in detail a musical performance. In 1976, he created his first major work, the installation, 12+1=, at the Galerie Média, a performance/installation shown later as a series of photos. In the same year, at the Montreal Museum of Fine Arts, Gervais did a performance titled Roche (Rock), since he used a rock to play the open keyboard of a piano. In 1977, he held a performance titled 3+1 at Galerie Gilles Gheerbrant in Montreal.

In 1980, he took part in the XI Paris Biennale and participated in the Cent jours d'art contemporain de Montréal in 1985. In 1986 he began his investigations of the aural imagination with an initial piece referencing Claude Debussy entitled Les concerts de l'imaginaire, followed in 1989 by a second installation inspired by the composer, Claude Debussy regarde l'Amérique, which was shown at the 49th Parallel Gallery in New York City. In 1990 his work became essentially silent.

In 2001, the installation Les couleurs de la musique composed mainly of album covers (now in the collection of the Musée national des beaux-arts du Québec) was exhibited at Galerie René Blouin. In 2011, curator Nicole Gingras organized a retrospective of Gervais' work Raymond Gervais 3x1 exhibited in two places and showing different parts of his career in each centre. The Leonard & Bina Ellen Art Gallery at Concordia University showed the devices which transmitted sound in Gervais' work, the show at VOX Contemporary Image Centre, focused on the gaze in the act of listening. In his later years, he created Finir, d'après Samuel Beckett et Claude Debussy for Rosascape, a centre for contemporary art, in Paris in 2012. In 2013, his work was included in Continental Drift - Conceptual Art in Canada: The 1960s and 70s, an exhibition held at the Badischer Kunstverein in Karlsruhe (Baden Art Association), Germany.

== Selected public collections ==
Gervais' work is in the collections of the National Gallery of Canada, the Musée national des beaux-arts du Québec and the Musée d'art contemporain de Montréal, as well as the Art Gallery of Ontario, and the CNAP (Centre National des Arts Plastiques), the national collection in France.

== Honours and awards ==
In 2010, Gervais received the Ozias Leduc award from the Fondation Émile-Nelligan. In 2014, he won the Governor General's Award in Visual and Media Arts.
