= Jocelyn Robert =

Canadian artist (born 1959)

- Born: 1959 (age 66–67); Quebec City, Quebec, Canada
- Education: Université Laval (BA); Stanford University (MA)
- Occupations: Artist, composer
- Known for: interdisciplinary artist
- Website: jocelynrobert.com

Jocelyn Robert (born 1959) is a Canadian post-modern interdisciplinary artist from Quebec City, Quebec. In 1993, he co-founded the collective Avatar in Quebec City, which became the province's flagship in sound and electronic art. He was its first President and from 2004 to 2009 its artistic director. He also participated in the founding of the Méduse cooperative.

His work with Audio art and electronic art ranges from computer to video, sound and performance art. He explores themes of transference, memory and space-time. His visual artworks and videos have been exhibited internationally and his sound works can be found on more than 30 CDs. His texts have been published in Canada and abroad. His work has been the subject of several publications.

== Career ==
Robert was born in Quebec City, Quebec, and at first studied pharmacy then architecture. He graduated with his B.A. from the School of Architecture, Laval University (Québec, QC) in 1984, then in 1991, took a summer intensive course in Computer Programming from Simon Fraser University, School of Arts, in Vancouver and in 2003, he received his M.A. from Stanford University, California. He was a Professor in the Intermedia Department, Mills College, Oakland, California from 2003 to 2004, then in the School of Visual and Media Arts, University of Quebec in Montreal (2006-2008). Since 2008, he has been a Professor at the School of Art, Laval University and from 2012 to 2017, director at the School.

== Work ==
Robert has said he went into art in 1987 "as one goes into the resistance". He has made recordings, written works, installations and performances across Canada, in the USA and in Europe, in "festivals, conferences, and in the street". Since the mid-1980s, Robert has released albums most people would describe as containing no music at all. His main themes have been the world as he hears it from silence to noise. His 2007 sound recording Bingo, for instance, has sounds of "cracklings, breathing, mutterings" mixed with digital noises. His approach to the medium came from the plastic arts, and he sees them as parts of his intermedia works rather than as individual notes and beats.

He has said about his approach to sounds and images in visual art:

The need to separate a work’s reading into "sounds", "images", and other things always surprises me. I remember a discussion I once had with the American artist Paul Demarinis. I mentioned to him an article in which a theoretician maintained that we should increase the number of human "senses". Essentially, this scholar said that the division of perception into five senses dated from the Middle Ages, and that it was time to bring it up to date. He himself proposed a minimum of fifty-four senses, in which, for example, there would be different designations for the touching of cold surfaces, texture, pressure, and so on. Paul replied that he understood the idea, but that it dated from after the Middle Ages and was more rooted in the nineteenth century than in the twentieth, and that, in his view, the number of senses today should be "one". This made me smile with relief.

Robert was one of the first artists in Québec to create connections between visual art and technology. In a number of works, Robert breaks or distorts the passage of time. For instance, in The Invention of Animals (2001), he digitally disrupts the straight trajectory of an airplane in flight, causing the plane to appear to flit like a butterfly. The soundtrack suggests both an animal and a machine. In the video installation Domestic Politics (2002), the almost still video images show time passing in a fragment of everyday life projected into a cardboard box, as if was portable and could be inserted into another space-time. Robert also has organized support structures for artistic practice such as Avatar.

== Selected exhibitions ==
Robert has had solo exhibitions, beginning with one at Laval University in 1987, mostly in alternate spaces in Canada and abroad. In 2005, a retrospective exhibition titled Jocelyn Robert. The inclination of the gaze was organized by curator Louise Déry for the Galerie de l'UQAM, Montreal and in the same year, None of my hands hurts, was organized by VOX, contemporary image center, Montreal. In 2015, the Musée des Beaux-Arts de Nantes organized Robert's Interférences, which used works from the collection combined with works by Robert, in four different locations in Nantes. In 2019, he presented Conjonctures at Expression Centre d'exposition de Saint-Hyacinthe. He has participated in many group shows from 1992 on in Canada and abroad, notably at Transmediale.02, the International Media Art Festival Berlin, Haus der Kulturen der Welt, Berlin (2002) and at the Musée national des beaux-arts du Québec (2004, 2008, 2008-2009).

== Selected collections ==
Robert’s work is in such public collections as the Musée national des beaux-arts du Québec and the Musée d'art contemporain de Montréal

== Awards and grants ==
Robert has received support in the form of grants and awards from the Canada Council for the Arts, Ottawa; the Council of Arts and Letters of Quebec, Quebec; the Ministry of Culture and Communications, Quebec; and other institutions. In 2002, he won First prize in the Image category, Transmediale.02, in the International Media Art Festival Berlin, Berlin. In 2022, he received a Governor General's Awards in Visual and Media Arts.
