= Jeff Thomas (photographer) =

Canadian art photographer (born 1956)

- Born: 1956 (age 69–70); Buffalo, New York, U.S.
- Awards: Governor General's Award in Visual and Media Arts

Jeff Thomas (born 1956) is an Onondaga Nation photographer, curator, and cultural theorist who works and lives in Ottawa, Ontario.

Thomas is known for his photographic work that addresses and interrogates the place of First Nations people in contemporary Canadian society. Often, his works explore the disjuncture between depictions he sees of Indigenous people as relics of the past (for instance, in museums), and contemporary Indigenous life as he views it.

His work includes the "Indians on Tour" series began in 2000, in which stereotypical "Indian" figurines are posed against natural or urban landscapes, otherwise against historical monuments and contemporary culture, as Thomas' photographs document First Nations people. In his "Vanishing Race" series, he depicts encounters with stereotypical depictions of Indigeneity.

He is the father of Ehren "Bear Witness" Thomas of the musical group The Halluci Nation (formerly known as A Tribe Called Red.)

== Early life ==
Thomas was born in 1956 in Buffalo, New York. Growing up, he spent time in Buffalo as well as the Six Nations of the Grand River reserve.

== Photographic career ==
Thomas' photographic practice is primarily concerned with showing the perspective of an "urban Iroquoian person," and what he calls “symbols of Indian-ness.” His work has been shown in galleries and museums across Canada, as well as in the United States and parts of Europe. In 1997, Thomas was featured in Ali Kazimi's documentary film, "Shooting Indians: A Journey with Jeffrey Thomas," which premiered at the Toronto International Film Festival.

== Collections ==
- Canadian Museum of Contemporary Photography, Ottawa
- Canadian Museum of Civilization, Ottawa
- Carleton University Art Gallery, Ottawa
- Library and Archives Canada Ottawa
- Oakville Galleries, Oakville, Ontario
- Kamloops Art Gallery, Kamloops, B.C.
- National Gallery of Canada, Ottawa
- MacLaren Art Centre, Barrie, Ontario
- Museum of the American Indian Washington
- Musée de l’Elysée, Lausanne
- Museum der Weltkulturen Frankfurt
- The British Museum, London
- Ottawa Art Gallery
- Winnipeg Art Gallery
- Woodland Cultural Centre, Brantford, Ontario

== Selected solo exhibitions ==
- 2024: Stories My Father Couldnt Tell Me: Jeff Thomas Origin, Ottawa Art Gallery
- 2008: Com·mem·o·ra·tion, MacLaren Art Centre, Barrie, Ontario
- 2008: Who’s your Daddy?: Four Hundred Years Later, Karsh/Mason Gallery, Ottawa, Ontario
- 2008: Don’t Mess with the Pediment, Stephen Bulger Gallery, Toronto
- 2008: Drive By: A Road Trip with Jeff Thomas, University of Toronto Art Centre, Toronto, Ontario
- 2007: Jeff Thomas: Traces of Iroquois Medicine, Ontario Museum of Archaeology, London, Ontario
- 2006: Jeff Thomas: A Study of Indian-ness, Southern Alberta Art Gallery, Lethbridge, Alberta; Grunt Gallery, Vancouver, British Columbia
- 2004–2005: Jeff Thomas: A Study of Indian-ness, Art Gallery of Southwestern Manitoba, Brandon, Winnipeg; Regina, Saskatchewan; Toronto, Ontario
- 2004: Scouting for Indians, the Oakville Galleries, Oakville, Ontario
- 2001: Scouting for Indians, Artspace, Peterborough, Ontario; American Community House, New York City
- 2001: Lurking in the Shadows, Musée de l’Elysée, Lausanne, Switzerland
- 2001: Geronimo Was in Here, The Buffalo Arts Studio, Buffalo, New York
- 2000: Scouting for Indians, Carleton University Art Gallery, Ottawa, Ontario

== Awards ==
In 2008, Thomas was awarded the Karsh Award in Photography. He was a recipient of the Governor General's Award in Visual and Media Arts in 2019.
