= Lola (magazine) =

Toronto visual arts publication

- Editor: Catherine Osborne
- Art director: Sally McKay
- Editor at large: Scott Anderson
- Production manager: Roberta McNaughton
- Web designer: Roberta McNaughton
- Advertising representative: Rachel Yeager
- Categories: Visual arts
- Frequency: Biannual
- Circulation: 1,000
- Publisher: Sharon Salson Gregg
- Founder: Sally McKay; John Massier; Catherine Osborne
- Founded: 1997; 29 years ago
- Final issue Number: July 29, 2003; 22 years ago 16
- Company: Lola Ltd.
- Country: Canada
- Based in: Toronto
- Language: English
- Website: lolamagazine.com

Lola magazine was a Toronto visual arts publication that ran for seven years between 1997 and 2003.

== Description ==
Lola was launched by artist/writer Sally McKay, curator John Massier and arts writer and editor Catherine Osborne. Their aim was to reinvigorate the city's visual arts scene by creating an open forum for writers, artists and the general public to comment and critique exhibitions and art events within the city. The most popular section of the magazine was a review section called Shotguns, where everyone was invited to write a review of a recent exhibition or event. Hundreds of writers and "non-writers" contributed to the section, creating a vibrant forum for discussion and commentary. What set Lola apart from other contemporary art magazines was its open dislike for art jargon and intellectualization. Writers were encouraged to be frank, honest, open and clear in their opinions and ideas.

Distributed for free at galleries in Toronto and sold on newsstands throughout Canada, Lola was considered a hybrid between a magazine and a zine (however, all its revenue was generated through advertising and subscriptions, distinguishing it from most zines, which generally have no source of revenue). Unlike most arts magazine in Canada, which rely almost exclusively on government funding, Lola received very little government support. In its seven years, Lola received one grant from the Canadian Government to support its growth in newsstand sales and subscriptions.

After the second issue was published in 1998, John Massier left the magazine. Catherine Osborne became the editor and Sally McKay became art director, though both played an equal role in the development of the editorial content. Production of the magazine took place mostly at McKay's second-floor apartment in Parkdale, with editorial meetings held once a week at Lakeview Diner, a popular greasy spoon on Dundas Street in Toronto. Initially, Lola was published twice a year. In its final year, the magazine was published quarterly.

Despite the magazine's grassroots origins, the founders were keen to turn the magazine into a profitable and financially viable magazine. In 2002, Sharon Salson (who later became Sharon Gregg) joined the staff as publisher and advertising director. With the new role, Lola's founders hoped to secure a financial investor in order to transform the magazine into a paid publication that would attract more advertisers and readers. No financial backer was found, which led to the magazine's demise after the release of Issue 16 in September 2003.

During its run, Lola was frequently covered by the press, with articles appearing The Globe and Mail, Toronto Star, NOW, Shift, CBC among many others.

== Awards ==
Lola was nominated magazine of the year by the National Magazine Awards Foundation in 2001 and 2002. In 2000 Lola received Honourable Mention in the category "Magazine of the Year" at the Canadian National Magazine Awards. In 2001 Gerald Hannon won the silver award in the "Arts & Entertainment" category at the Canadian National Magazine Awards for his article Monk-y Business for Lola magazine, volume 10, Fall 2001.
