= Robert A. Hackett =

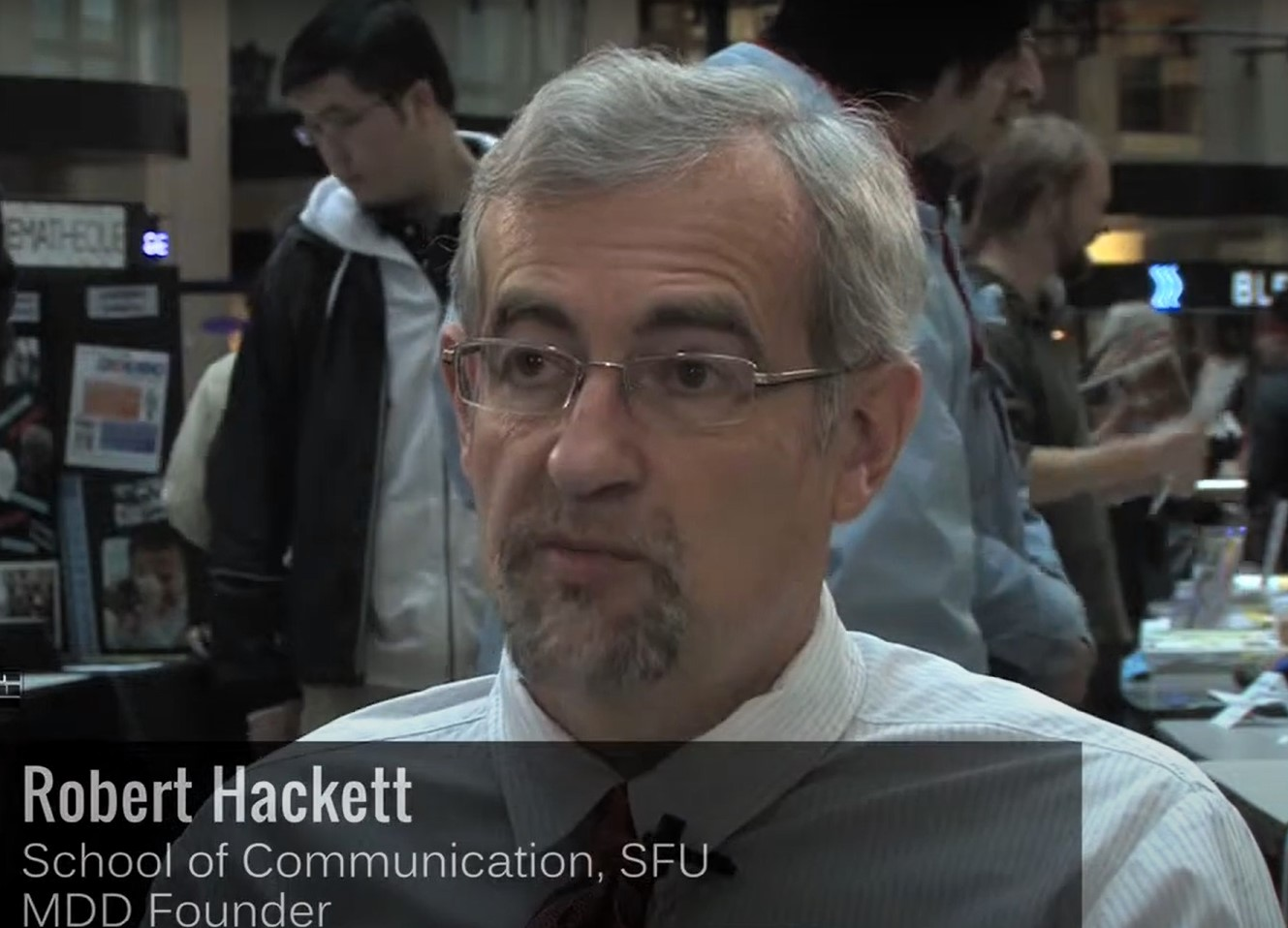
Hackett speaks at Media Democracy Days Vancouver before 2013

Robert A. Hackett is a Canadian university professor and researcher. He has been a professor and researcher at the School of Communication in Simon Fraser University, Vancouver, British Columbia, Canada since 1984. His main areas of research include media activism, political communication and news analysis. Since 1993, he has co-directed NewsWatch Canada , a news media monitoring project based at Simon Fraser University.

He is also on the editorial board of several journals. He has conducted numerous media interviews and public talks, written policy briefs, and has helped to found several community-based media action and education initiatives, including Vancouver's annual Media Democracy Days. His work has been translated into Chinese, Serbian and Ukrainian.

== Research contributions and interests ==
Hackett's research in journalism studies, news objectivity and normative paradigms centers around critiquing the existing structures of journalism objectivity with a focus on its political and ideological implications in a globalized and networked digital age. The research contributes to the analysis of emerging paradigms that challenge what he and his co-author coined as "the regime of objectivity" in North American journalism.

His work in media democratization, media activism, social movement theory, communication rights and democratic communication models focuses more on citizen efforts to make media institutions more accountable and diverse, in alliance with social movements that aim to redistribute social, economic and political power and capital. In particular, Hackett has been concerned with media democratization as a rising social movement, the subject of his internationally circulated book with William K. Carroll, Remaking Media. In conjunction with WACC and OpenMedia.ca, he has also researched Canadian activists’ views of communication policy in the Canadian context.

He has also contributed to news analysis in peace and war; peace journalism; media frames; content and textual analysis and news determinants. With Donald Gutstein, and at the invitation of the Canadian Association of Journalists, Hackett initiated NewsWatch Canada in 1993; initially a Canadian version of Project Censored, which identifies top stories missed each year by the corporate media in the US, NewsWatch has evolved into an occasional survey of Canadian news media coverage of selected issues. His research on media frames and the influences on news content took an international turn with his work on peace journalism and international news reporting of and in relation to conflict.

Hackett is on the editorial boards of several publications, including Journalism Studies, a peer-reviewed academic journal that critically discusses journalism as an academic inquiry and an arena of professional practice.

== Books ==
- R. Hackett, "Pie in the Sky: A History of the Ontario Waffle". Monograph published as a special edition of Canadian Dimension, Vol. 15, No. 1 and 2, October/November 1980
- R. Hackett, "News and Dissent: The Press and the Politics of Peace in Canada". Norwood, N.J.: Ablex, 1991.
- R. Hackett, "Engulfed: Peace Protest and America’s Press during the Gulf War". New York: New York University Center for War, Peace, and the News Media, 1993.
- Robert.A. Hackett, Yuezhi Zhao. "Sustaining Democracy? Journalism and the Politics of objectivity". University of Toronto Press, 1998
- R. Hackett and K. Cross. "Political Communication and the News Media in Democracies: Competing Perspectives". Kyiv: Osnovy Press, 2000 (In Ukrainian only)
- R. Hackett, R. Gruneau, D. Gutstein, T. Gibson and NewsWatch Canada. "The Missing News: Filters and Blind Spots in Canada’s Press". Ottawa: Canadian Centre for Policy Alternatives/Toronto: Garamond Press, 2000,
- Robert A Hackett (ed.), Yuezhi Zhao (ed.). "Democratizing Global Media: One World, Many Struggles".Rowman & Littlefield, 2005
- William K Carroll, Robert A Hackett. "Remaking media: The struggle to democratize public communication". Routledge, 2006
- I.S.Shaw, J. Lynch and R. Hackett (eds). "Expanding Peace Journalism: Critical and Comparative Approaches". Sydney University Press, 2011
