= Colette Whiten =

Canadian artist (born 1945)

- Born: 1945 (age 80–81); Birmingham, England, United Kingdom
- Known for: Sculptor, conceptual artist
- Awards: 2013 Governor General's Awards in Visual and Media Arts

Colette Whiten (born 1945, Birmingham, England) is a sculptor, installation and performance artist who lives and works in Toronto, Canada. She was a recipient of the Governor General's Awards in Visual and Media Arts in 2013.

== Early life and education ==
Colette Whiten was born in Birmingham, England. She graduated from the Ontario College of Art in 1972, and was a recipient of the Governor General's Awards in Visual and Media Arts.

== Career ==
In contrast to the "Minimalism" of the 1960s and 1970s. Whiten's art included elements of performance in her sculptures by emphasizing the body processes involved in her work. She built stocks and scaffolding-like structures of wood, concrete blocks, and rope, each of which she designed with a particular male model in mind. The scaffolding would then hold the models' bodies in predetermined poses, while a team worked to cast them in plaster. In order to cast the bodies, Whiten would first shave the men and coat the body in petroleum jelly. The casts were then used to produce fiberglass body parts.

For her 1972 exhibition at the Ontario College of Art, Whiten exhibited her body-part sculptures, along with the scaffolds that she used to create them, and photographic silkscreens and slide projections that she had taken to document the process of their creation. The effect was that the stocks resembled severed limbs, and the scaffolds torture devices. Until 1975 the performance of creating the work was often as important as the final cast.

Although Whiten's work reversed the more common gender roles between artist and model, she denied that her work had a feminist agenda. One of her fiberglass pieces is a bust of a man sucking his thumb."

Whiten's People Sculpture (1983) is a work of self-rusting steel panels with cutouts of figures that commissioned by the Sudbury Chamber of Commerce and stands in a small park at the corner of Brady and Paris streets in downtown Sudbury, Ontario.

In the mid-1980s, Whiten's work took a new direction when she began making small-scale stitched works. The cross-stitched needlework's imagery was sourced from daily newspapers. The first series focussed on the male newsmakers of the world, specifically political leaders, represented in a traditionally female craft. The second series of needlepoint works again used images from media as sources, but of women. The women represented by the media are typically in groups, either mourning or protesting.

In 1992, she returned to making large-scale works, this time making beaded images sourced from mass media events. In these works Whiten considers how media shapes an individual's understanding of current events. Some of the beaded images represented actual headlines from the news, while others source news photos. A number of these works were in the exhibition, Colette Whiten: Seducing the Receiver at the Oakville Galleries in Ontario.

Whiten's sculpture La Scala, created in collaboration with Paul Kipps, is on outdoor public display in downtown Toronto.

Whiten has taught at the Ontario College of Art since 1974. She has also taught at York University from 1975 to 1977.

Colette Whiten is represented by Susan Hobbs Gallery in Toronto.

== Awards and achievements ==
Upon graduation from the Ontario College of Art in 1972, Whiten received the Governor General's medal for her first cast piece exhibition. She also received the Toronto Arts Foundation's Visual Arts Award in 1991. Whiten received the Governor General's Awards in Visual and Media Arts in 2013.

== Exhibitions ==
=== Selected exhibitions ===
- Agnes Etherinton Art Centre, Queen's University, Kinston, Ontario, 1973
- "8e Biennale de Paris," Musée d'Art Moderne de la Ville de Paris, 1973
- "Some Canadian Women Artists," National Gallery of Canada, Ottawa, 1975
- "Colette Whiten: New Needleworks," The Power Plant, Toronto, 1992
- "Seducing the Receiver," Oakville Galleries, Oakville, Ontario; Galeria Carles Poy, Barcelona, Spain; Susan Hobbes Gallery; Agnes Etherington Art Centre, Queen's University Kingston, Ontario; London Regional Art & Historical Museum, London, Ontario; and Dunlop Art Gallery, Regina, Saskatchewan, 1995–1998
- "Wack!: Art and the Feminist Revolution," The Museum of Contemporary Art, Los Angeles, 2007

== Selected bibliography ==
- Agnes Etherington Art Centre. Colette Whiten. Kingston: Agnes Etherington Art Centre, 1973
- Borsa, Julianna. "Colette Whiten and Carmen Lamanna Gallery." Artmagazine (Toronto) 8, no. 34 (August–September 1977): 40-41.
- Burnett, David. "Some Canadian Women Artists." Artscanada (Toronto) 32, no. 4 (winter 1975-76): 54-58.
- Colette Whiten. Exh. cat. London, Ontario: London Regional Art Gallery, 1978. Text by Philip Monk.
- Fleming, Marnie, Colette Whiten, and Oakville Galleries. Colette Whiten: Seducing the Receiver. Oakville, Ont.: Oakville Galleries, 1995
- Towne, Elke. "Prince Charming and the Associated Press: The Needlepoint Work of Colette Whiten" (1987). Reprinted in Jessica Bradley and Lesley Johnston, eds. Sightlines: Reading Contemporary Canadian Art. Montréal: Artext, 1994.
- Whiten, Colette, Paul Kipps, et al. Colette Whiten and Paul Kipps: Over Taking over. Lethbridge: Southern Alberta Art Gallery, 2002
- Whiten, Colette, Alain Reinaudo, et al. Colette Whiten: coproduction W 139 Amsterdam Hollande, Centre d'art d'Herblay France, Carles Poy Galeria Barcelone Espagne, Décembre 92 - Mai 1993. [France]: Cahiers des Regards, 1992
- Whiten, Colette, Richard Rhodes, and The Power Plant (Art gallery). Colette Whiten: New Needleworks. Toronto: Power Plant, 1992
- Whiten, Colette, and Mirjam Westen. Colette Whiten. Herblay: Centre d'art d'Herblay, 1993
- Zemans, Joyce. "The Sculpture of Colette Whiten." Art Magazine (Toronto) 6, no. 19 (fall 1974): 16-18.
