= Aganetha Dyck =

Canadian artist (1937–2025)

- Born: Aganetha Rempel; September 12, 1937; Marquette, Manitoba, Canada
- Died: July 18, 2025 (aged 87)
- Education: Prince Albert Community College, 1974-1976; University of Winnipeg, 1980–1982
- Known for: Sculptor, graphic artist
- Spouse: Peter Dyck (m. 1958)

Aganetha Dyck (September 12, 1937 – July 18, 2025) was a Canadian sculptor residing in Winnipeg, Manitoba. Dyck is best known for her work with live honeybees, that build honeycomb on objects that she introduces to honeybee hives. In 2007 Dyck was awarded both Manitoba's Arts Award of Distinction and Canada's Governor General's Award in Visual and Media Arts.

== Background ==
Dyck was born Aganetha Rempel, in 1937, to Mennonite parents in Marquette, Manitoba, a French-Canadian farming town 50 km north of Winnipeg. She married Peter Dyck, a Mennonite merchant from Winnipeg, in 1958. The family moved to Prince Albert, Saskatchewan, in 1972 where Aganetha Dyck enrolled in art courses. At the Prince Albert Community College Dyck studied pottery, batik, Salish weaving, and art criticism. While at Prince Albert, Dyck had the opportunity to be mentored by Professor George Glen and studied Art History. The family returned to Winnipeg in 1976. Between 1980 and 1982 Dyck studied art history at the University of Winnipeg.

Dyck died on July 18, 2025, at the age of 87.

== Career ==
Dyck's early work is described as transforming domestic processes into fine art, thereby validating activities that are traditionally considered feminine. In her early work, Dyck used household materials such as buttons, wool fabrics, and cigarettes. Close Knit, completed between 1975 and 1981, took inspiration from a dryer accident with a piece made of wool. Various pieces of wool clothing were then intentionally shrunk for this work. A 1984 Winnipeg Art Gallery exhibition of Dyck's work featured several hundred jars of buttons prepared and cooked using different culinary techniques.

After accidentally felting some of her woven work, she began to design felt sculptures, such as Close Knit (1975–1981), Skirt Issue (1981), and Forest (1975–1981), as well as sculptures that combined felt art with found objects, such as 23 Suitcases (1981).

Dyck is best known for her work with honeybees, which began in 1989 when she rented beehives, and was described by her as a collaboration. She was inspired when she came across a store sign made out of honeycomb. Dyck placed objects into beehives, or beehives into objects, and allowed the insects to build honeycombs on the objects, sometimes over the course of years. This work is considered to be exemplified by Glass Dress: Lady in Waiting (1992–1998), currently held at the National Gallery of Canada. The work took 10 beekeeping seasons to create. Another collaboration with bees is Hockey Night in Canada (1995–2000) in which various pieces of sports equipment are turned into beehives.

Dyce's work with honeybees drew attention from the press, and she was featured in the CBC television show The Nature of Things, with David Suzuki. Dyck collaborated with beekeepers and entomologists in making her sculptures. In addition to appreciating the beauty of the honeycomb, Dyck hoped that "people will realize the importance of the honeybees' work."

Even as Dyck began her artistic practice by referencing the domestic objects and tasks with which she was most familiar, she continued to employ traditional signifiers of womanhood through the collaborative creation of honeycomb-encrusted high heels, handbags, and even a wedding gown.

Dyck's work with bees has been featured in Troyes, Paris, Rotterdam, and at the Yorkshire Sculpture Park in England. A selection of her awards includes the Manitoba Arts Council Award of Distinction (2007), Governor General's Award in Visual and Media Arts (2007), Winnipeg's Art City Star Award (2013), Winnipeg Art Council's Making a Mark Award (2014). Dyck's show "Collaborations" was featured at Burnaby Art Gallery 2009 In 2018, Close Knit was included in Thunderstruck: Physical Landscapes, a Canada Council exhibition about contemporary dance.

Dyck was on the board of directors of Plug In ICA and served as a board member and mentor in Mentoring Artists for Women's Art.

The University of Manitoba Archives & Special Collections has the Aganetha Dyck Fonds. It includes textual records related to her art career, and artifacts.

=== Selected works ===
- Close Knit (1975–1981), Canadian Council Art Bank.
- Closest to Her (2007), National Gallery of Canada.
- Queen (2007), National Gallery of Canada.
- Glass Dress: Lady in Waiting (1992–1998), National Gallery of Canada.
- Hive Drawing #2 (2008), Burnaby Art Gallery.

=== Awards ===
- Manitoba's Arts Award of Distinction (2007).
- Governor General's Award in Visual and Media Arts (2007).
- Spotlight on 40 years: Artwork from Canada Council Art Bank (2012).
- Art City Star Award, Winnipeg (2013).
- Making a Mark award by the Winnipeg Arts Council (2014).

=== Select exhibitions ===
- 2009 – Aganetha Dyck: Collaborations (solo), Burnaby Art Gallery, Burnaby, British Columbia, Canada.
- 2011 – Guest Workers (solo), Confederation Centre Art Gallery, Charlottetown, Prince Edward Island, Canada.
- 2014 – Surreal Transformations (two-person show with Richard Dyck), Art Gallery of Algoma, Sault Ste. Marie, Ontario, Canada.
- 2014 – You've Really Got a Hold on Me, Oakville Galleries, Oakville, Ontario, Canada.
- 2014 – Aganetha Dyck: Honeybee Alterations, Ottawa School of Art, Ottawa, Ontario, Canada.
- 2017 – Cross Pollination, 516 Arts, Albuquerque, New Mexico, USA.
- 2017 – AlterNation, Kamloops Art Gallery, Kamloops, British Columbia, Canada.
- 2017 – Animal Intent, apexart, New York, USA.
- 2019 – Displacement, Vancouver Art Gallery, Vancouver, BC.
- 2019 – Something More Than Nothing, The Reach Gallery Museum, Abbotsford, British Columbia, Canada, and touring to the Art Gallery at Evergreen Cultural Centre, Coquitlam, BC.

=== Collections ===
Dyck's work is held in the collections of the National Gallery of Canada, Ottawa, ON; the Burnaby Art Gallery, Burnaby, BC; Confederation Centre Art Gallery, Charlottetown, PEI; Dunlop Art Gallery, Regina, SK; Kelowna Art Gallery, Kelowna, BC; Oakville Galleries, Oakville, ON; Vancouver Art Gallery, Vancouver, BC; Winnipeg Art Gallery, Winnipeg, MB; Tom Thomson Memorial Art Gallery, Owen Sound, ON; Saskatchewan Arts Board, Regina, SK; Manitoba Arts Council Art Bank, Winnipeg, MB; Canada Council Art Bank, Ottawa, ON; Glenbow Museum, Calgary, AB; Art Gallery of Guelph, Guelph, ON; and the Art Gallery of Windsor (now Art Windsor-Essex), ON, amongst others.
