= Suzanne Rivard-Lemoyne =

Canadian artist (1928–2012)

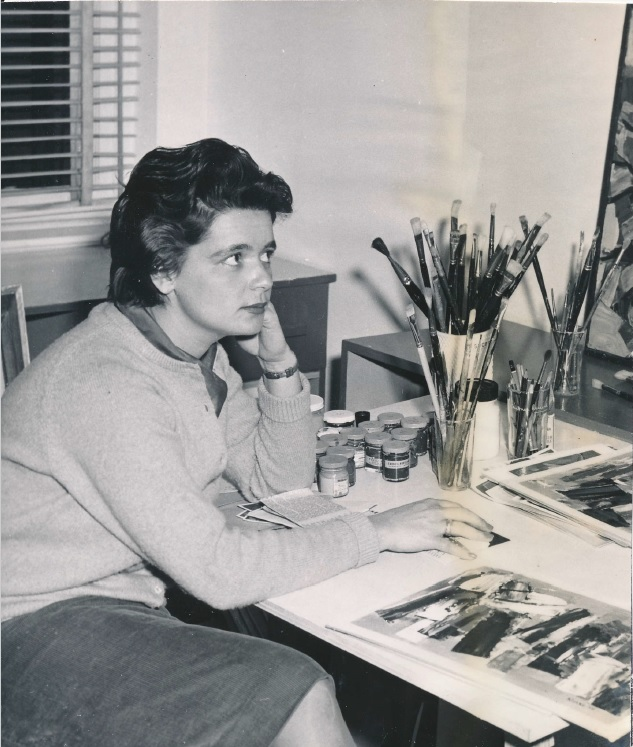
- Born: March 28, 1928; Quebec City, Quebec
- Died: October 29, 2012 (84 years old)
- Education: École des beaux-arts de Québec
- Spouse: Jean Le Moyne
- Awards: Governor General's Award in Visual and Media Arts

Suzanne Rivard-Lemoyne (March 28, 1928 – October 29, 2012) was an artist born in Quebec City, Quebec who later moved to Ottawa, Ontario and is known for her significant contribution to arts administration. She was responsible for developing Art Bank, the Canada Council's art collection program in 1972. Rivard-Lemoyne became a Visual Arts Officer for the Canada Council in 1970 and started the art collection and leasing system for government offices, offering regional artists support and those interested in collecting access to local art. She played a major role in supporting and developing the local community of artist-run centres and contemporary art galleries. Rivard-Lemoyne won the 2003 Governor General's Awards in Visual and Media Arts for Outstanding Contribution in arts support.

== Education and early work ==
Suzanne Rivard-Lemoyne trained at the École des beaux-arts de Québec, as well as with André Lhote in Paris in 1957. Rivard-Lemoyne's teaching career spanned from 1952 to 1986, at the École des beaux-arts de Québec, the École des beaux-arts de Montréal, and the University of Ottawa. She did mural painting in Montréal, including at Expo 67.

== Arts administration and teaching ==
Rivard-Lemoyne started doing arts administration in 1969, after moving to Ottawa, in the Cultural Division of the Secretary of State of Canada. In addition to her administrative work at the Canada Council, Rivard-Lemoyne was Chair of the University of Ottawa's Department of Visual Arts and Theatre (1974–1982) and is recognized for significantly developing the department. She was also on the board of the Ottawa Arts Centre Foundation.

== Artwork ==
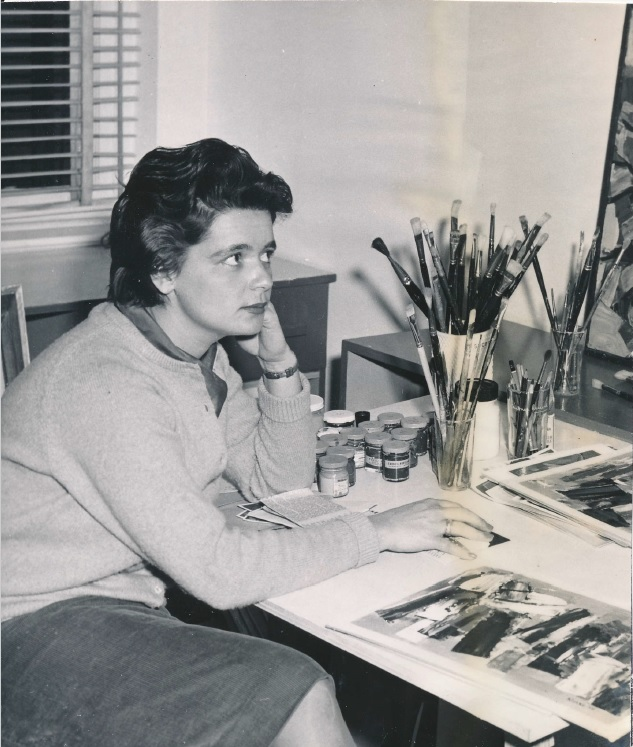
Suzanne Rivard Lemoyne at her desk likely in Montreal in the 1960s.

Rivard-Lemoyne helped to organize the Canada Trajectories 73 exhibition at the Musée d'art moderne de la Ville de Paris and in London. The Ottawa Art Gallery presented an exhibition of Rivard-Lemoyne's drawings and paintings in 1996 called Survol. The exhibition curator, Diane Génier, describes Rivard-Lemoyne's drawings and paintings as atmospheric and process driven, dealing with themes of light and immensity. Rivard-Lemoyne started making large-scale monochromatic encaustic paintings in 1991, and prior to that in the 1980s, painted expressionistic landscapes with the later works in this series making use of simplified colour fields.

Rivard-Lemoyne won the First Grand Prize of the Concours artistique de la province de Québec in 1958. Her work is in the collections of the City of Ottawa, the Musée national des beaux-arts du Québec, Concordia Art Gallery, and private collections in Montréal, Ottawa, Québec, and Paris.

== Exhibitions ==
- 1952, Concours artistiques de la province de Québec, Musée du Québec
- 1955, La matière qui chante, Galerie Antoine, Montréal
- 1957, Biennial of Canadian Painting, National Gallery of Canada
- 1959, The Non-Figurative Artists' Association of Montreal, Musée des beaux-arts de Montréal
- 1961, Canada Council Award-Winners, Canadian Conference of Arts, St-Lawrence Centre, Toronto
- 1988, Montréal Women Artists of the 1950s, Concordia Art Gallery
- 1990, Silences, The Gallery at Arts Court, Ottawa
- 1992, Picture a Place: Art contemporain d'ici, The Gallery at Arts Court, Ottawa
