= Micah Lexier =

Canadian artist and curator (born 1960)

- Born: 1960 (age 65–66); Winnipeg, Manitoba
- Education: University of Manitoba, Nova Scotia College of Art and Design
- Known for: Sculpture

Micah Lexier (born 1960 in Winnipeg, Manitoba) is a Canadian artist and curator. He was educated at the University of Manitoba (BFA, 1982) and the Nova Scotia College of Art and Design (MFA, 1984). He is represented by Birch Contemporary (Toronto). He lives and works in Toronto. In 2015 he was awarded the Governor General's Award in Visual and Media Arts.

== Art practice ==
Lexier combines conceptual art with sculpture. Lexier expresses the concepts he has developed through sculptural means, using ready-mades or materials prepared using industrial processes.

In a work in the collection of the Art Gallery of Ontario, A work of art in the form of a quantity of coins equal to the number of months of the statistical life expectancy of a child born January 6, 1995 (1995), Lexier creates a portrait of a person using coins. A series of coins are neatly ordered in a box; in an adjacent box, loose coins sit in a gradually growing pile. Every month, another coin gets transferred from the first box to the other. Together, the 906 coins represent the life of an individual; the transfer of coins notates the passage of time. This work embodies a number of themes that are central to Lexier's art practice: timelines; life span; mortality; and the ordering of things and their undoing.

Lexier works in series; starting with a simple idea, he explores it in a systematic fashion. Series by Lexier include, Book Sculptures (1993), A Minute of My Time (1996-2000), Arrows (started 2004), Revelations (started 2005), and various collaborations with other artists and individuals. Lexier's interest in ephemera adds another dimension to his practice. He makes posters, exhibition invites, T-shirts, and other art multiples to create parallel lives for his artworks, extending his art practice out of the gallery and into the world. In 2010, the Press of the Nova Scotia College of Art and Design published, I'm Thinking of a Number, a 30-year survey which documents this aspect of his practice.

David: Then & Now (2005) is an example of how Lexier extends ideas by reworking them. It consists of adjacent portraits of people named ‘David’. The portraits are of the same person taken 10 years apart, first in 1993 and then a decade later. In keeping with Lexier's overall approach to artmaking, the work's emotional tone is muted, yet it dramatizes the universal fact of aging. A temporary public artwork, the project was seen on bus shelters throughout Winnipeg. The work is a follow-up to an earlier piece by Lexier, A Portrait of David (1994), which presents 75 portraits displayed on a freestanding wall. Each portrait is of a male named ‘David’, arranged chronologically from age one through 75.

Lexier is often the subject of his work. He has said, "Everything an artist does is portraiture, in a way". This is true of his on-going series, A Minute of My Time (born 1995), in which scribbles the artist makes over the course of a minute are transformed in a variety of ways, including: factory-produced water-cut metal sculptures, etchings, custom minted coins, lines sewn onto pieces of paper, spray-painted graffiti, and chalkboard drawings. The work memorializes the fleeting trace of the artist's hand as a timeless monument.

A 2009 work, I Am the Coin, was commissioned by the BMO Financial Group. An example of the artist's interest in serial forms of measurement, I Am the Coin, features a grid of 20,000 custom-made coins, each minted with a letter. Together the coins spell out a story, written by the writer Derek McCormack.

== Collaborations with writers ==
In addition to working with McCormack, Lexier has collaborated with the Canadian poet, Christian Bök and the Irish writer, Colm Tóibín. In 2008, Lexier produced a project with Tóibín and the entire student body of Cawthra Park Secondary School. Lexier commissioned the Irish author to write a short story that was exactly 1334 words long, one word for every student in the school. Each student then handwrote one of the 1334 words that make up the story, which was published in an 8-page newspaper that was given away.

== Public artworks ==
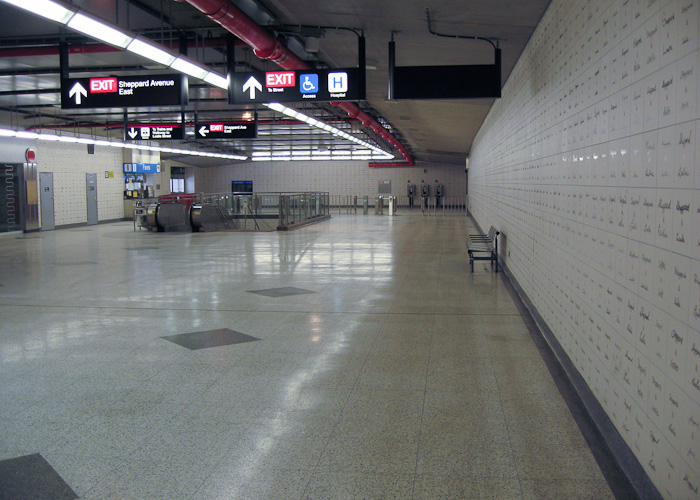
"Ampersand" on the tiled walls of Leslie subway station in Toronto

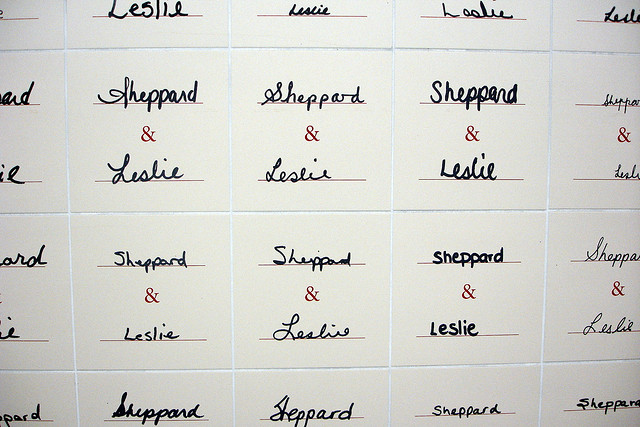
Close up of the "Ampersand" installation

Lexier has produced over a dozen public sculptures, often involving the repetition of large quantities of a specific item. For example, Ampersand (2002) is a public art work located in the Leslie subway station on the Sheppard line of Toronto's TTC public transit system. The work consists of 17,000 ceramic tiles featuring the text ‘Leslie’ and ‘Sheppard’ as handwritten by thousands of different individuals. As with his David portraits, this work, in the words of the artist, "acknowledges the duality of being both an individual and part of a larger community."

== Curatorial work ==
His curatorial projects have included One, and Two, and More Than Two at The Power Plant, Toronto; A to B at MKG127, Toronto; Here Now or Nowhere, Grande Prairie; Alberta (2009); The For Example series, Mount Saint Vincent Art University Art Gallery, Halifax (2007–2009); and Audio By Artists, a festival at the Centre for Art Tapes and Eye Level Gallery, Halifax (1984/1985/1986). Lexier is co-editor with Dan Lander of Sound By Artists, co-published by Art Metropole and Walter Phillips Gallery (1990). A second edition of Sound By Artists was published by Charivari Press in 2013. Since 2006, Lexier has been Visual Art Editor, for Bloom , Los Angeles.

== Public commissions ==
- Toronto Transit Commission, Sheppard/Leslie Subway Station (2002)
- Agnes Etherington Art Centre, Queen's University, Kingston, ON (1999)
- Air Canada Centre, Toronto (1999)
- National Trade Centre, Toronto (1997)
- Whitby Psychiatric Hospital, (collaboration with Regan Morris) (1996)
- Scurfield Hall, University of Calgary, Alberta (1994)
- Metropolitan Toronto Metro Hall, Toronto, Ontario (1992)
- Tom Thomson Memorial Art Gallery, Owen Sound, Ontario (1991)
- Hamilton Public Library, Hamilton, Ontario (1990)

== Public and corporate collections (selected) ==
- Art Gallery of Ontario, Toronto, Ontario
- The Bellagio Hotel, Las Vegas, Nevada
- The British Museum, London, England
- FRAC des Pays de la Loire, Nantes, France
- The Jewish Museum, New York, New York
- Musée d'art contemporain de Montréal, Montréal, Quebec
- Museum of Contemporary Art, Sydney, Australia
- National Gallery of Canada, Ottawa, Ontario
- National Gallery of Australia, Canberra

== Awards ==
- Governor General's Award in Visual and Media Arts (2015)
