= Sally McKay =

Canadian artist, curator, writer, educator and personal art coach

- Born: Saskatoon, Saskatchewan, Canada
- Education: Medway High School, Nova Scotia College of Art and Design, York University
- Known for: Artist, writer, curator, teacher, coach
- Website: https://www.sallymckay.ca

Sally McKay is a Canadian artist, curator, writer, educator, and personal art coach based in Hamilton, Ontario. McKay is known for her work as an artist of many forms and her research, which explores cognition, consciousness and social structures with a particular interest in the intersections between art and science. McKay has worked in a variety of media including performance, installation and digital art. She is also a widely recognized educator and art coach known for her collaborative work and has worked at a number of Canadian universities. Alongside her work as an artist and researcher, McKay is a writer. McKay has written for, founded and edited several publications and magazines, most notably Lola.

== Early life and education ==
Sally McKay was born in Saskatoon and grew up near London, Ontario. Her father, poet Don McKay, and her mother, Jean McKay, were both writers. McKay's brother Joe is also an artist. McKay attended Medway High School in Arva, Ontario before studying at Nova Scotia College of Art and Design in Halifax, where she graduated with a Bachelor of Fine Arts, with an Art History Minor, in 1990. In the years following her graduation, McKay moved to Toronto where she established herself as an artist and curator. In 2014, McKay completed a PhD. in Art History and Visual Culture from York University, with a thesis entitled "Repositioning Neuroaesthetics Through Contemporary Art". Whilst at York University McKay was awarded the Joyce and Fred Zeman's Scholarship.

== Employment history ==
  - Assistant Professor, School of the Arts, McMaster University, Contractually Limited Appointment (2014–2018)
  - Full Time Lecturer, School of the Arts, McMaster University, Hamilton, ON, (2012–2014)
  - Sessional Instructor, School of Fine Arts and Music, University of Guelph, Guelph, ON, (2011)
  - Sessional Instructor, Visual Art and Art History, Faculty of Fine Arts, York University, Toronto, ON (2009)
  - Editor, WADE a catalogue accompanying the a public art exhibition in Toronto wading pools curated by Sandra Rechico and Christie Pearson (2007)
  - Managing Editor at YYZ Books, YYZ Artists' Outlet, Toronto (2003–2004)
  - Founding co-editor/owner, Lola magazine with Catherine Osborne (1997–2003)

== Art ==
Over the span of three decades McKay has produced art in an array of media including; performance, drawing, painting, sculpture, digital and installation art. McKay's 12-hour performance piece "BedTime Fortune Story Teller" for example, has been said to demonstrate her interest in pushing art to extremes. McKay was an early adopter of digital art and has demonstrated a keen interest in digital surveillance. In a 2005 exhibition, McKay combined gifs and installation art, which at the time, was considered to be cutting edge multimedia work. McKay has also produced work with a social purpose and has seen performance art as having the power to transform society. McKay combined performance art and advocacy in her 1998 work with Spirit of Spadina. McKay created a number of mass-protests and performances in the middle of Toronto's highways to draw attention to the number of cyclists killed in Toronto. McKay has also used more traditional art forms, including drawings. McKay's sketches of brain waves and her rendering of abstract neuroscientific concepts into sketches was a prominent aspect of her later art. McKay placed a greater focus on teaching, research and academia as she began her PhD in 2014 but continues to produce art.

== Teaching ==
McKay has worked as an educator and professor at a number of Canadian universities. In 2009, McKay was a Sessional Instructor in the Faculty of Fine Arts at York University, while she was studying for a PhD there. In 2011, McKay became a Sessional Instructor in the School of Fine Arts and Music at the University of Guelph. From 2012 to 2014, while she was still completing her PhD, she was also a Full Time Lecturer in the School of the Arts at McMaster University. After graduating from York University in 2014, McKay worked as a full time university professor. From 2014 to 2018, McKay was an assistant professor at McMaster University in the School of the Arts. Throughout her decade of teaching, McKay has led courses in Art History and Visual Culture, Contemporary Art, Canadian Art, Neuroaesthetics, Digital Media, Multimedia and Installation Art and Performance Art. McKay has suggested her teaching philosophy positions student-directed learning as the core value of her teaching practice. During her time at McMaster University McKay taught a range of courses that combined practice, theory and research in a number of disciplines. Some of McKay's teaching areas include: Visual Art, Canadian Art History, Community Exhibitions, Applied Humanities and Studio Methods.

== Themes ==
Over the course of her career McKay has produced works, which explore a number of different themes. In the late 1990s, McKay created a number of artworks, which examined government safety campaigns, especially campaigns about the safety of cyclists and pedestrians in Toronto. In 1998 McKay joined the Spirit of Spadina group, which sought to use performance art as a vehicle through which to pressure Toronto City Council into adding a bike lane on the busy Spadina Avenue. McKay organised and participated in a mid-road vigil in 1998 with Spirit of Spadina to commemorate the death of James Macmillan. Between 1998 and 2000 McKay collaborated with Ben Lea Smith on "Safety Animal" a performance piece which attempted to engage with the public and satirise safety campaigns which position a burden of responsibility onto cyclists and pedestrians rather than cars and lorries. "Safety Animal" was performed at the "Offsite@Toronto" exhibition for Mercer Union. McKay's art ultimately enabled her to meet with the Chief Coroner of the City of Toronto to discuss how to improve conditions for cyclists.

McKay later developed an interest in gender roles and anthropomorphic notions of nature. In 2000, McKay developed "The Miss Mouse Project" which consisted of a series of performances and video art. The Miss Mouse Project was created around the character of Miss Mouse who was a large, pink, highly feminised anthropomorphic creature who featured in all performances and videos for the project. The project was aimed at critiquing gender roles and identity as well as satirising anthropomorphic notions of gender. The Miss Mouse Project toured across Europe and North America.

McKay has demonstrated an interest in the Internet and the digital world more broadly. McKay was an early adopter of the Internet and her website was called "easily the most lively and informative" of Canadian artists by critic R.M Vaughan. McKay has explored the digitisation of the planet and humanity's relationship with the digital world. In 2005, McKay created an installation artwork for the Case Study Gallery's exhibition "Waypoint" which included GPS coordinates and an offsite geo-cache. McKay said she was interested in "the dystopian scenario that makes GPS work" and her work aims to demonstrate how geography and location are digitized and monitored.

The theme to which McKay has most frequently returned is that of the relationship between art and science. McKay is especially interested in cognition, consciousness and social structures. Since completing a PhD on the relationship between neuroscience and art McKay has published articles in a number of academic journals about cognitive science and art, including Canadian Art and RACAR as well as contributing a chapter to Alfonso Scarzini's book Aesthetics and the Embodied Mind. McKay also explores the relationship between art and neuroscience throughout her many artworks. McKay is currently working on a project entitled "The Haunted Scanner" with her partner Von Bark. For this project, which is funded by the Ontario Arts Council, McKay and Von Bark are building a brain scanner which will be used on audience members. McKay has stated that she believes art and neuroscience to be intrinsically linked because "the active ingredient in any art experience is the viewer's mind".

== Writing ==
McKay writing has appeared in newspapers, magazines, academic journals, exhibition catalogues and books. McKay's essay Donut, which was published in Susan Kealey: Ordinary Marvel, was described as “among the best of the essays” in the book. In 2011, McKay's essay “Nature in the Network” won the OAAG's Art Writing prize. McKay work and writing was published in Lola, the magazine she co-edited and co-owned.

=== Books ===
McKay was the co-editor, alongside Andrew J. Paterson, of Money Value Art: State Funding, Free Market, Big Pictures,which was published in Toronto by YYZ Books in 2001. In 2015, McKay contributed to the book Aesthetics and the Embodied Mind: Beyond Art Theory and the Cartesian Mind-Body Dichotomy by Alfonsina Scarzini. She wrote an essay called “No Neuron is an Island: A Neuroaesthetic Inquiry into Omer Fast's Mimetic Interactions”. The source is an art historical analysis of Israeli artist Omer Fast's video work Talk Show. McKay examines the existing neuroscientific consensus and literature on mirror neurons exploring how these would explain a human reaction to Fast's artwork. Ultimately, McKay concludes that artwork can produce aesthetic experiences, which are inaccessible to the epistemological context of the FMRi Lab.

=== Magazine and journal publications ===
In 2019, McKay wrote a feature essay titled "On the Brain: How we encounter art is more complex than neuroscience suggests” which was published in the Canadian Art Magazine. McKay argues that art stimulates neuronal connectivity and provokes richer, more complex neural activity. In her work and her writing, McKay explores neurological reactions to art. McKay focuses on the theories of neurologists and philosophers, and believes audiences must be empowered to embrace more open-ended, active modes of interaction. McKay believes that neurologically art provides a unique form of pleasure, which is not related to gratification or emotional reward.

=== Lola ===
Lola was a visual arts publication that ran for seven years: between 1997 and 2003. Sally McKay launched the magazine, alongside her colleague, artist and writer, Catherine Osborne. McKay and Osborne founded Lola because, in McKay's words, Toronto had “a lot of art going on but no discourse”. The magazine was an open forum for writers, artists and the general public to comment and critique exhibitions and art events within the city McKay co-edited Lola for the duration of its 16 edition run and under McKay's leadership it enjoyed a peak distribution of 12,000.

Lola did receive criticism from some of the Toronto art community who were angered at the magazine's policy of publishing unsigned critiques of exhibitions. McKay insisted that this policy protected Lola's contributors from being discriminated against by grant jury's for writing critical articles. McKay admitted that Lola used “a lot of tabloid sensationalism” but maintained that this enabled the magazine to “discuss contemporary art in a pop culture context” and suggested that while “the art community hated us and everyone else loves it”.

== Curating ==
McKay has curated a number of exhibitions in Ontario and Canada more broadly. In 2008, McKay curated “Quantal Strife”, an exhibition of three Ontario artists originally hosted at the Doris McArthur Gallery in Toronto but which ultimately toured across Canada including to Victoria. The exhibition was described by the Times Colonist as an ‘eloquent example of contemporary art practice" and The Globe and Mail described McKay's curation of "Quantal Strife" as "charming, lucid, and very smart" whilst The Toronto Star described the exhibition as "flat out brilliant". McKay has also held a three-week curatorial residency at Open Space in Victoria.

McKay also worked as a curator at the Kitchener-Waterloo Art Gallery's 3rd Biennial in 2007. McKay curated an exhibition entitled "Woodlot" which featured art from 14 separate artists from the Waterloo area, working in a variety of media. According to McKay "Woodlot" explores "cultivated landscapes" as a theme and interrogates mankind's relationship and mastery over nature.

== Honours and achievements ==
In 2013 McKay was awarded the Joyce and Fred Zeman's Scholarship by York University. This annual scholarship is awarded to graduate students recommended by their graduate programme director for academic excellence. McKay was awarded the SSHRC Joseph-Armand Bombardier Canadian Graduate Scholarship, which secured $35,000 worth of funding each year from 2010 to 2012. This scholarship is awarded by the Government of Canada. McKay was also awarded the Ontario Association of Art Galleries' Art Writing Award in 2011 for her essay "Nature in the Network". McKay's essay, on the Canadian artist collective, was published in the catalogue which accompanied the Art Gallery of York University's 2011 exhibition "Donkey@Ninja@Witch".
