= Chantal Pontbriand =

Canadian curator and art critic (born 1951

- Born: 1951 (age 74–75)
- Known for: Founder-Director of Parachute

Chantal Pontbriand (born 1951) is a Canadian curator and art critic whose work explores globalization and artistic heterogeneity. She has curated international contemporary art events: exhibitions, international festivals and international conferences, primarily in photography, video, performance, dance and multimedia installation.

== Career ==
Pontbriand, born in Montreal, was the founder-director of Parachute, a contemporary art magazine that she founded in 1975 and acted as the publisher/editor until 2007, and the FIND (International Festival of New Dance) that she co-founded in 1982 and acted as president and director until 2003. Both institutions were based in Montreal. In 2010, she was appointed Head of Exhibition Research and Development at Tate Modern in London.

In 2013, Pontbriand received the Governor General of Canada Award for Outstanding Contribution in the Visual and Media Arts. In 2014, Pontbriand received an Honorary Doctorate from Concordia University, Montreal, and the distinction of Officier of the Arts and Letters Order of France.

On October 22, 2015, the Museum of Contemporary Canadian Art (MOCCA) appointed Pontbriand to the newly created position of CEO. Pontbriand was to serve as the founding curator of Demo-Graphics 1, a new international art event planned for the Greater Toronto Area in 2017. However, on June 23, 2016, eight months into her tenure, Pontbriand left her position as the CEO of the rebranded MOCA.

== Exhibitions ==
- See Words, I Hear Voices, Dora Garcia, The Power Plant, Toronto
- Mark Lewis Above and Below, Le Bal, Paris, 2015
- Per/Form: How To Do Things with[out] Words, CA2M, Madrid
- The Yvonne Rainer Project, Jeu de Paume, Centre d'art de la Ferme du Buisson, and Palais de Tokyo, Paris
- Photography performs: The Body as the Archive, Centre de photographie d'Île-de-France (CPIF)
- Dora Garcia, Of Crimes and Dreams, Darling Foundry, Montreal, 2014
- Higher Powers Command, Lhoist Collection, 2010
- HF|RG [Harun Farocki|Rodney Graham], Jeu de Paume, Paris 2009

== Publications ==
- Suzanne Lafont, Musée départemental d'art contemporain de Rochechouart, Rochechouart, 1997 ISBN 978-2-911540-02-8
- Mutations, Perspectives on Photography, Steidl/Paris Photo, 2011
- The Contemporary, The Common: Art in A Globalizing World, Sternberg Press, Berlin, 2013
- Per/Form: How To Do Things with[out] Words, CA2M/Sternberg Press, Madrid/Berlin, 2014
- Parachute: The Anthology, JRP/Ringier, Zurich, 2012–2015 (4 volumes).
