= Wayne Ngan =

Canadian ceramic artist, painter, sculptor (1937-2020)

- Born: May 19, 1937; Guangdong, China
- Died: June 12, 2020 (aged 82–83); Hornby Island, British Columbia
- Education: Vancouver School of Art (1958-1963); worked with Japanese Master Potter Yoichi Murakami in Japan (1978)
- Known for: prominent West Coast ceramic artist, sculptor
- Spouse: Anne Ngan
- Awards: Saidye Bronfman Award (1983); British Columbia Applied Art and Design Award of Distinction (2013)

Wayne Ngan (May 19, 1937 – June 12, 2020) was a prominent British Columbia ceramic artist, whose pottery creations at times veered towards sculpture. He was also known for his painting. His work has been exhibited around the world, including in China, where he often travelled to lead workshops.

== Biography ==
Ngan was born in Guangdong, China and emigrated to Canada in 1951, growing up in Richmond, BC. In 1958, Ngan began studying ceramics at the Vancouver School of Art with Robert Weghsteen (1929-2015). He received the Marie E. Lambert Pottery Prize and graduated with honours in 1963. During these years, Ngan was influenced by the teachings of British potter Bernard Leach and Japanese potter Soetsu Yanagi, the founder of the Mingei folk-art movement which advocated the discovery of beauty in everyday ordinary objects created by unknown craftsmen. In 1965 a solo exhibition of Ngan's work was held at Bau-Xi Gallery in Vancouver.

In 1967, Ngan moved from Vancouver to Hornby Island in British Columbia. He and Anne Ngan collaborated on a hand-built family home on Downes Point, and he also built his studio along with assistance and input from noted experimental builder Lloyd House. He also built kilns for firing pottery there, including a Raku kiln, a gas-fired kiln, and an oil-and-wood kiln for salt glazing. During the same years, he lectured and taught ceramics at schools in Canada and China, led workshops locally and abroad, and made and exhibited his work. In 1978, the Vancouver Art Gallery organized an exhibition of his pottery, titled "Pottery by Wayne Ngan," which was curated by Doris Shadbolt and accompanied by a catalogue. Ngan also traveled during this period, studying Sung and Early Ming Pottery and architecture in China (1977) and working with Japanese Master Potter Yoichi Murakami in Japan (1978).

In the early 1980s, having separated from his wife, Ngan built a new house and studio on Ostby Road, Hornby Island. In 1983, he was awarded the Saidye Bronfman Award and a grant from the Canada Council for the Arts to build a wood-fired kiln based on a Sung Dynasty one he had seen in a Chinese museum, completed in 1984 and dismantled in 2004 to make more room for his practice of sculpture and painting. In 2013, he was awarded the British Columbia Applied Art and Design Award of Distinction.

Ngan pottery is praised by critics and collectors alike for its fusion of ancient East Asian ceramic traditions with Canadian West Coast modernism. He transformed functional clay vessels into contemplative works of fine-art sculpture, creating "things that are both functional and incredibly elegant", as the then director of the Art Gallery of Greater Victoria, Jon Tupper said. "The Gulf Islands in the 1960s attracted some of the greatest potters Canada has every produced", Tupper added. "Wayne Ngan is certainly among the best of them".

Ngan appeared in a film, Wayne Ngan on Hornby Island (Michael Speier) which was shown across Canada. In 1996 he was invited to appear on the TV show Sesame Street.

In 2020, he died of lymphoma at his home on Hornby Island where he lived for more than 50 years.

== Selected public collections ==
- Canadian Museum of History, Gatineau, Quebec (Collection Data Base lists 78 works);
- Art Gallery of Greater Victoria;
- Bronfman Collection, Montreal;
- Vancouver Art Gallery;
- Montreal Museum of Fine Arts;
- Gardiner Museum, Toronto;
- National Palace Museum, Taipei, Taiwan;
- Morris and Helen Belkin Art Gallery, University of British Columbia;
- Winnipeg Art Gallery (Collection Data Base lists 4 works);

== Legacy ==
In 2020/21 Ngan's work was included in the Modern in the Making exhibition at the Vancouver Art Gallery, and in the We do not Work Alone exhibition at the Nanaimo Art Gallery. In 2025, an exhibition of Ngan's work titled Wayne Ngan: Spirit and Form was held in New York at James Cohan Gallery. Also in 2025, Ngan's work was exhibited in Written in Clay: Written in Clay: From the John David Lawrence Collection and in 2026, Highlights from the Collection, both organized by the Vancouver Art Gallery.

His work today is sold by his studio on Hornby Island and auction houses in Canada.
