= Patricia Bovey =

Canadian politician

The Honourable Patricia Bovey
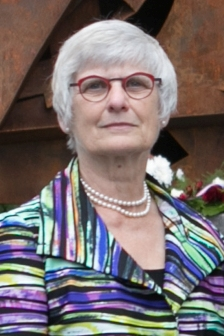
- Bovey in 2017

Canadian Senator from Manitoba
- In office November 11, 2016 – May 15, 2023
- Nominated by: Justin Trudeau
- Appointed by: David Johnston
- Preceded by: JoAnne Buth

Personal details
- Born: May 15, 1948 (age 78)
- Party: Progressive Senate Group
- Other political affiliations: Independent Senators Group (2016–2020)
- Spouse: John Harvard
- Occupation: Art historian; gallery director; curator; academic
- Website: www.patriciabovey.com

Patricia E. Bovey (born May 15, 1948) is a Canadian art historian, gallery director, curator, and academic.

== Career ==
Bovey was the curator of the Winnipeg Art Gallery (1970–1980), director of the Art Gallery of Greater Victoria (1980–1999) and the Winnipeg Art Gallery (1999–2004); and an art consultant (2004–2016). She founded and was the director/curator, of Winnipeg's Galerie Buhler Gallery in the St Boniface Hospital (2007–2016). She is a past chair of the Board of Governors of the University of Manitoba and a former member of the Board of Trustees for the National Gallery of Canada. She also sat on the Board of the Canada Council for the Arts. She was appointed Director Emerita of the Winnipeg Art Gallery in 2014.

On October 27, 2016, Bovey was named to the Senate of Canada by Prime Minister Justin Trudeau. Bovey assumed her seat on November 10, 2016, as a member of the Independent Senators Group. On May 8, 2020, Bovey left the ISG and joined the Progressive Senate Group. During her time in the Senate, Bovey fought for arts-related causes such as reinvigorating the Portrait Gallery of Canada.

Bovey retired from the Senate on May 15, 2023, upon turning 75, the mandatory retirement age for Senators.

== Awards and honours ==
- Fellow of the UK’s Royal Society for the Arts;
- Fellow of the Canadian Museums Association;
- the Canada 125 Medal;
- Queen’s Golden Jubilee Medal;
- YWCA's 2002 Woman of Distinction for the Arts;
- Canadian Museums Association Distinguished Service Award;
- Royal Canadian Academy of Arts Medal;
- 2013: Association of Manitoba Museums' inaugural Award of Merit.
- 2015: Alberta Book Awards' recipient for book about Patricia Martin Bates;
- 2019: Manitoba Book Awards' finalist for book on Don Proch;
- 2021: Honorary doctorate (LL D) from the University of Manitoba.

== Selected memberships and boards ==
Bovey has served as the chair of the Board of Governors of the University of Manitoba and Board chair of Emily Carr University. She served on the National Gallery of Canada's Board of Trustees; the Board of the Canada Council for the Arts; the Withrow/Richard Federal Task Force on National and Regional Museums; the Eckhardt-Gramatté Foundation Board; and the Board of the Manitoba Chamber Orchestra; and was a member of the Trudeau Foundation and the Manitoba selection committee for both the Rhodes Scholarships and the Loran Scholarship. She is a past chair of the Canadian Art Museum Directors Organization.

== Selected publications ==
Bovey writes mainly on Western Canadian art.

- A passion for art: the art and dynamics of the Limners, Victoria, B.C. : Sono Nis Press, 1996;
- Lionel LeMoine FitzGerald: The Development of an Artist, Ann Davis; Patricia E. Bovey, the Winnipeg Art Gallery: Winnipeg, 1978;
- Pat Martin Bates: Balancing on a Thread, Frontenac House, 2013;
- Don Proch: masking and mapping, Winnipeg: University of Manitoba Press: St. John's College Press, 2019;
- Western voices in Canadian art, Winnipeg: University of Manitoba Press, 2023.
