= Pierre Ayot =

Canadian artist (1943-1995)

- Born: June 26, 1943; Montreal, Quebec, Canada
- Died: May 2, 1995 (aged 51); Berthierville, Quebec, Canada
- Known for: multidisciplinary artist
- Spouse: Madeleine Forcier

Pierre Ayot (June 26, 1943 – May 2, 1995) was a multidisciplinary artist, university professor and the founder of Atelier Libre 848 (1966) (renamed Atelier Graff in 1970), an art centre devoted to printmaking that provides its members with training, expertise and facilities. He also was a founding member of the group Média, gravures et multiples (1969).

Other early founders of printshops include Richard Lacroix who founded Atelier Libre (1964), the first printshop in Canada which made printmaking facilities available to contemporary artists, and the Guilde Graphique (1966) in Montreal, Jack Lemmon and Robert Rogers who founded the NSCAD Lithography Workshop in 1969, Richard Sewell and Barbara Hall who founded Open Studio in Toronto in 1970, and William H. Lobchuk and Len Anthony who founded The Grand Western Canadian (GWC) Screen Shop in Winnipeg in 1973. Ayot also was a member of the GWC Screen Shop and made prints in Winnipeg.

== Career ==
Ayot was born in Montreal and studied at the Ecole des Beaux-Arts, Montreal (1959–1962) and with Albert Dumouchel. He also taught there (1964), and at the Université du Québec, Montreal (1969–1995). In 1966 he founded and directed Atelier Libre 848, a printmaking workshop (known as Atelier Graff from 1970 on). He also was one of the founding members of the group Média, gravures et multiples, which was next door to Graff and served as publisher and dealer for its prints. Graff fostered a group of artists interested in Pop art.

He was guest artist at Centro Internazionale di Sperimentazione Artistiche Marie Louise Jeanneret, Boissano, Italy (1982–1983).

In 1995 at the age of 52 he died in an auto accident near Berthierville, Quebec.

== Work ==
Ayot was one of the artists attracted to Pop art in Quebec, along with Serge Lemoyne, Edmund Alleyn and COZIC. Ayot's imagery at first drew upon comic strips and media culture, then celebrated everyday objects. He developed silkscreen and photographic collage techniques with elements from graphic design and advertising. He applied Pop art to graphic work, using plastic and photography as in his two and three-dimensional interpretations of a gum machine used real gumballs and a silk-screened machine as well as his versions of a toaster and tape-recorder. He also made sculpture, painting and photography, as well as audio and visual installations.

== Selected exhibitions ==
Ayot's work was included in Canada '67 shown at the Museum of Modern Art in New York. Retrospectives of his works have been organized by the Musée d'art contemporain de Montréal (MACM), Pierre Ayot: Le médium n'est pas le message (1980) and by the Montreal Museum of Fine Arts, Pierre Ayot: Hors cadre(s) = Pierre Ayot: Unlimited (2001). In 1992, Pierre Ayot et son Museum Circus was organized by the Musée national des beaux-arts du Québec. In 2016, Pierre Ayot - Regard critique / Pierre Ayot - Critical Insight, along with several other exhibitions examined the whole of the artist’s career.

== Selected public collections ==
Ayot’s work is in the public art collections of the National Gallery of Canada; The Montreal Museum of Fine Arts; the Musée d'art contemporain de Montréal; the Remai Modern; the Winnipeg Art Gallery; and the Tate Gallery, London; among others. The work of Pierre Ayot is represented by Graff Gallery, Montreal.

== Awards ==
- Annual Exhibition of Graphic Art in Calgary (1965, 1967);
- Artistic Competition of the Province of Quebec (1966, 1971);
- Louis-Philippe-Hébert Prize (1989)

== Legacy ==
Prix Pierre-Ayot, created in Ayot's memory by the City of Montreal and the Contemporary Art Galleries Association (AGAC) is awarded each year to an emerging artist. The Graff Prize is awarded by Graff annually to a mid-career artist practicing in the fields of engraving or printmaking. The Pierre Ayot collection (P905) is in the Montreal archives of the Library and National Archives of Quebec (BAnQ). In 2024, his work was included in The Pop of Life! at the Montreal Museum of Fine Arts.

== Atelier Graff ==
Atelier Graff is today a contemporary art centre with an active membership. In 2015, it joined with the Société d'habitation et de développement de Montréal (SHDM) to offer professional artists and crafts workers customized work premises.
