= Richard Lacroix =

Canadian artist (born 1939)

- Born: Joseph Samuel Richard Lacroix; July 14, 1939 (age 87); Montreal, Quebec, Canada
- Known for: engraver, painter and sculptor

Richard Lacroix (born July 14, 1939) is a Canadian engraver, painter and sculptor who increased recognition for Canadian printmaking. He was the founder of Atelier Libre (1964), the first printshop in Canada which made printmaking facilities available to contemporary artists, as well as the Guilde Graphique (1966).

Other early founders of printshops include Pierre Ayot, founder of Atelier Libre 848 (1966) (renamed Atelier Graff in 1969), in Montreal, Jack Lemmon and Robert Rogers who founded the NSCAD Lithography Workshop in 1969, Richard Sewell and Barbara Hall who founded Open Studio in Toronto in 1970, and William H. Lobchuk and Len Anthony who founded The Grand Western Canadian Screen Shop in Winnipeg in 1973.

== Career ==
Lacroix was born in Montreal, Quebec, and as a youth attended Saturday morning art classes at the Montreal Museum of Fine Arts School of Art and Design. He later learned printmaking and wood engraving from Albert Dumouchel and other teachers at the Institute of Graphic Arts in Montreal (1957-1960). In 1960 he received a certificate in teaching and in methodology at l'Ecole des Beaux-Arts, Montreal as well as a certificate in aesthetics and history of art from the Institut des Arts Appliqués, Montreal. He was hired as a professor of engraving at the l'Ecole des Beaux-Arts, Montreal in 1960.

From 1961 to 1963, a grant from the Canada Council for the Arts enabled him to do internships at several European engraving workshops including Atelier 17 of Stanley William Hayter in Paris. There he learned the technique of polychromy on a plate and had his first contact with inking techniques based on the differences in viscosity of the inks and the variation in consistency rollers used to apply them. His training in Paris also taught him about calligraphy and the philosophy of Chinese and Japanese Zen masters. He returned to Canada from Paris in 1963 with two antique printing presses he had found in France and a set of gelatin rollers. In 1964 in Montreal he opened l'Atelier Libre de Recherches Graphiques with the assistance of the Ministry of Cultural Affairs of Quebec. It was the first printshop in Canada to make printmaking facilities available to contemporary artists and quickly attracted artists wishing to learn new techniques.

In 1966, he founded La Guilde Graphique, again with the assistance of the Ministry of Cultural Affairs of Quebec. It served at first as the publishing house, distributor, dealer and exhibition area for the prints produced by Atelier Libre but then became an independent focus for printmaking in Montreal. On the list of people who utilized it to create prints are listed many Canadian artists besides Lacroix who were abstract or used abstraction or Surrealism to some degree such as Guido Molinari, Claude Tousignant, Marcelle Ferron, Alfred Pellan, Jacques Hurtubise, Tobie Steinhouse, Norman McLaren, and Kittie Bruneau, among others .

In 1964, with several artists, among them Yves Robillard, Lacroix created an artist-run centre, Fusion des Arts in Montreal, the first arts synthesis group in the country, which aimed at promoting new relationships between art and society. Subsequently, Arts Fusion's political activities came under scrutiny and police raided its offices. Because of these activities, Fusion des arts lost a collective commission for Expo 67. However, Lacroix as an individual created a kinetic sculpture and produced a show as part of Expo 67.

== Work ==
Lacroix's "vivacious and textured" polychrome intaglio engravings and paintings of acrylic on canvas, sometimes diamond-shaped, are abstract. They reflect Minimal or Colour Field art practice or have forms drawn from nature or organic life. In 1965, Canadian Art magazine said that he gained a reputation as "one of the finest print-makers in the country for the purity and clarity of his editions".

Besides his participation in numerous solo and group shows at public and private galleries, both in Canada and abroad, he had a retrospective at the Guilde Graphique, Richard Lacroix: Exposition rétrospective: Gravures et peintures choisies (1959-1984) (1984). In 1985, he received museum attention with a retrospective Richard Lacroix: 25 ans de gravures et de peintures choisies (1960-1985) at the Musée du Québec. At the same time, he had another show at the Galerie Estampe Plus. In 1995, the Centre d'exposition de Baie-Saint-Paul organized Richard Lacroix: 10 ans de gravures et de peintures choisies (1985-1995).

His work is in such public collections as the National Gallery of Canada, the Musée national des beaux-arts du Québec (MNBAQ) (95 works), and the Victoria and Albert Museum in London, UK.

== Awards and honours ==
- First Prize, "Festival of Flowers" contest, Montreal Museum of Fine Arts (1962) (Honourable Mention, 1964);
- Prize, Second National Print Show, Burnaby (1963);
- Prize, Canadian Graphic Art Show (1964);
- Prize at International Biennial of Engraving, Lugano (1964);
- Honourable Mention, International Triennial of Engraving, Grenchen (1964);
- First Prize, Painting section, Hadassah Exhibition, Montreal (1965) (Second Prize, 1966);
- Honorary Member, Engraving section, Accademia Fiorentina delle Arti del Disegno, Florence, Italy (1965).
