= Léon Bellefleur =

Canadian artist (1910-2007)

- Born: February 8, 1910; Montreal, PQ
- Died: February 22, 2007 (aged 97); Montreal, PQ
- Education: mainly self-taught; teachers college, Montreal (graduating 1929); evening classes at the École des Beaux-Arts until 1936
- Spouse: Rita Jolicoeur (m. 1936)
- Awards: Canada Council grants (1958, 1978); Jessie Dow award (1951); honourable mention for his drawings in the Second Biennial Exhibition of Canadian Art (1951); first Quebec Government award for the arts (1977); Prix Borduas (1977); Louis-Philippe Hébert Prize from the Société-Saint-Jean-Baptiste (1985); honorary doctorate from Concordia University, Montreal (1985)
- Elected: member in 1989, Royal Canadian Academy of Arts

Léon Bellefleur RCA D.F.A. (February 8, 1910 – February 22, 2007) was a French-Canadian abstract painter and print-maker.

== Career ==
Léon Bellefleur was born in Montréal, Quebec, in 1910, and by the age of ten was drawing and painting. He earned a teaching diploma at Jacques Cartier teachers college in Montreal, graduating in 1929 and had a career in teaching for the next 25 years. He was mainly self-taught as an artist, but took evening classes from around 1929 until 1936 at the École des Beaux-Arts de Montréal where he expressed his youthful admiration for the work of Rembrandt. In 1938, Bellefleur met Alfred Pellan and through a friend, the Montreal art world. In 1943, he joined the Contemporary Arts Society. He was also a member of the Canadian Group of Painters, the Canadian Society of Graphic Art and The Non-Figurative Artists' Association of Montreal (1960).

He participated in the activities of the Montreal surrealists and in Montréal in 1945, he participated in the Exquisite corpse (Cadavre exquis) experiments with Albert Dumouchel, Jean Benoît, Jean Léonard, Mimi Parent and Pellan. In 1948, he signed the manifesto Prisme d'yeux, which defended diverse approaches to art-making.

After the group dissolved, he remained friendly with the members of the Prisme d'yeux, but followed his own aesthetic, inspired by Paul Klee, Kandinsky, Joan Miró, and children's art. Although he had been influenced in his early work by Pellan, following Surrealist automatism, he began to record the unconscious, creating coded atmospheres, states of mind and crystalline structures. He once said:

The fundamental discoveries for me were poetry, surrealism and esoterism - and, in art, a certain automatism translating the life of dreams and the unconscious, the world of chance and mystery.

In 1954, he left teaching and traveled to Paris to study engraving with Johnny Friedlaender. His efforts were acknowledged with a Canada Council Fellowship in 1958, and he again made a trip to Paris, studying at lithography at Ateliers Desjobert and meeting André Breton. He would continue to make lengthy trips to Paris for the next 12 years.

In 1960, along with Paul-Émile Borduas, Jean-Paul Riopelle, Harold Town, and Edmund Alleyn, he represented Canada at the Guggenheim International at the Guggenheim Museum in New York. In 1965, he returned to Montreal for good, and had solo exhibitions in Canada and abroad. In 1968, he received a second Canada Council grant, and J.-R. Ostiguy organized his retrospective for the National Gallery of Canada.

In 1977, he won the first annual Quebec government award for the arts as well as the Prix Paul-Émile-Borduas. In 1985, he received the Louis-Philippe Hébert Prize from the Société-Saint-Jean-Baptiste and an honorary doctorate from Concordia University in Montreal. He was made a member of the Royal Canadian Academy of Arts in 1989. He died in 2007 in Montreal. His papers are in the National Library and Archives of Quebec (P898).

== Record sale prices ==
In 2017, Bellefleur's Des rêves et du hasard, a 40" x 50" canvas, estimated at $18,000-$22,000, sold for $52,250 CDN (premium included) at the Heffel Auction, Vancouver.
