= My Father's Studio =

2008 film by Jennifer Alleyn

- French: L'atelier de mon père
- Directed by: Jennifer Alleyn
- Produced by: Jeannine Gagné
- Cinematography: Jean-Claude Labrecque
- Edited by: Annie Jean
- Music by: Simon Bellefleur; Jean-François Ouellet
- Distributed by: Les Films du 3 mars
- Release date: 2008
- Running time: 72 minutes
- Country: Canada
- Language: French

My Father's Studio (French: L'atelier de mon père) is a Canadian documentary film, directed by Jennifer Alleyn and released in 2008. The film is a reflection on her relationship with her father, artist Edmund Alleyn, based in part on footage she filmed of him prior to his death in 2004, and partly on new footage shot in his art studio after his death.

The film was a Jutra Award nominee for Best Documentary Film at the 11th Jutra Awards in 2009.
