= Gustavo da Roza =

Canadian architect (1933–2022)

Gustavo Uriel da Roza II
- Born: 24 February 1933; Hong Kong
- Died: April 24, 2022 (aged 89)
- Occupation: Architect
- Awards: Order of Canada
- Practice: Pacific Rim Architecture Ltd.
- Buildings: Winnipeg Art Gallery

Gustavo Uriel da Roza II, OC (24 February 1933 – 24 April 2022) was a Canadian architect best known for his work on the Winnipeg Art Gallery.

In 1988, he was made an Officer of the Order of Canada. He is a Fellow of the Royal Architectural Institute of Canada. In 2012, he was awarded the Queen Elizabeth II Diamond Jubilee Medal. He is a Commander of the Order of Prince Henry.

== Biography ==
Gustavo Da Roza was born in Hong Kong on 24 February 1933 to parents of Portuguese and Chinese descent. Da Roza was educated in Macau and Hong Kong and obtained a Bachelor of Architecture, Honours, from the University of Hong Kong in 1955. Upon graduation, Da Roza spent two years working on a number of government and institutional projects – first for R. Gordon Brown and later in a partnership with J.R. Firth. Da Roza recalls this time as a developers’ pressure cooker, as Hong Kong was growing rapidly due to an influx of foreign investment; "Everything was money", he recalls. At the same time, a lack of concern for local environment was at odds with his sensibilities.

Da Roza next moved to California, where he found a couple of project positions. He later gained a summer job in 1959 with The Architects Collaborative, in Cambridge, Massachusetts. This firm was established by former Bauhaus head Walter Gropius; there, amongst other projects, Da Roza he worked on designs for the Philips Academy in Andover, Massachusetts. In 1958 to 1960 Da Roza also taught as a sessional lecturer at the College of Environmental Design at the University of California, Berkeley.

In 1960 Da Roza immigrated to Canada to begin a teaching position with the School of Architecture at the University of Manitoba. At that time he began private practice in Winnipeg – registering with the Manitoba Association of Architects on 2 March 1961. Da Roza states that he planned to stay for only a couple of years but got caught up with the energy and optimism that was the building scene in Winnipeg in the 1960s. The architect won first prize and received two honourable mentions in the National House Design Competition in 1965. Two years later a house by Da Roza house was built as a part of the "Man and His Home" Pavilion at Expo ’67. Indeed, housing, particularly affordable housing, is a theme that recurs continuously in Da Roza's career.

Gustavo Da Roza’s best known building in Winnipeg is the Winnipeg Art Gallery. Opened in January 1972, the structure is a prominent downtown landmark and a visual symbol of the city. In 1967, Gustavo Da Roza entered and won the national competition for a new art gallery building. Responding to the gallery concept prepared by Dean John A. Russell in 1966, the winning design had to be "good architecture–not merely well built and adequately equipped, not merely functionally planned, not merely aesthetically attractive both within and without," but a safe, public structure in harmony with its environment. The jury found Da Roza’s submission a bold and dynamic solution, in fact "a brilliant symbolization of a progressive Winnipeg. Designed to the edges of its triangular site, Da Roza’s design for the Art Gallery forms a great limestone wedge on the northern portion of Memorial Boulevard. Da Roza joined in a consortium with Number TEN Architectural Group for the construction of the building, with Da Roza doing the design and Number TEN, led by Canadian architect Isadore (Issie) Coop, executing the working drawings and project management. The building was the nation’s third largest gallery at the time of its opening; it contains eight galleries and housed 20,000 works of art under tightly controlled atmospheric conditions and security. The building is also accommodates a rooftop sculpture garden (with facilities for outdoor performances), an auditorium, a library, gift shop and studio and lecture space. With its imposing shape, windowless mass and landmark location, the WAG has attracted a wide range of reaction and comment; generally it has been hailed as bold and imaginative. Luke Rombart of York University described the gallery as majestic, exciting and challenging, its architect "bright and restless." Fellow faculty member Jonas Lehrman criticized it for being overbuilt and elitist. Local journalist Val Werier expressed the awe and appreciation of many Winnipeggers and hoped that the WAG could use the new gallery to make great art accessible to the public, as the architect himself wished.

In the year that Da Roza entered the gallery competition, he was awarded a Canada Council Special Arts Award, which allowed him to study residential housing in Scandinavia, where he toured and studied the work of architect Ralph Erkine. Such research reinforced Da Roza’s particular interest in housing and in architecture that reflects its northern conditions. He has consistently been critical of buildings that are inefficient due to excessive use of glass, space and intractable mechanical systems. He has argued that other northern nations have adapted better to the extremes of climate, a dearth of which – he suggests – is partly to blame for a lack of a distinctive Canadian style. The Winnipeg Art Gallery, Da Roza has expressed, is in part a response to the severe Winnipeg weather. It was in this frame of mind that Da Roza tackled his vision for Gull Harbour Resort on Hecla Island in Lake Winnipeg. Featuring the ambience and design appropriate to an Icelandic village, the two-story complex has four wings of guestrooms and four suites which sprawl from a central lodge. There is an indoor pool and gym, a lounge and dining room which share an open limestone fireplace. The site is surrounded by a golf course, forest and beaches. Costing over $2 million, it was created by the Schreyer provincial government in 1977 and later sold to a private enterprise, renovated and expanded. The Gull Harbour Resort lodge and cabin wings have steeply sloped wooden roofs with no overhangs to block the sun. While use of wood and shingles on the huge roofs and the absence of windows on the north walls speak to a winter climate, spacious windows open to gardens and water on the sunny sides. Da Roza also designed the wood furniture used within Gull Harbour. It is, he points out, "inspired by the Icelandic architecture of the original settlers…. who had to be very responsive to the environment."

Maintaining his interest in housing, and continuing to design houses both great and small, Da Roza was chairman of the Canadian Housing Design Council from 1975 to 1977, winning an honourable mention in the agency’s Affordable Housing Project competition in 1979. In 1980, he won for a National Competition for a Low Energy Building, and the following year his Manitoba Housing and Renewal Corporation design for townhouses in Nassau Square, Winnipeg, also won honourable mention. The jury’s comments complemented the architect on a successful integration to an existing neighborhood and for breaking down the scale of the project by using a variety of materials and forms. In 1977, Da Roza, again in another collaboration with Number TEN Architectural Group, was a finalist in the National Gallery Competition, coming second only to John C. Parkin’s entry. In 1978, when fire destroyed the historic Church of Immaculate Conception, a parish of Portuguese Catholics in Point Douglas, Da Roza was able to replace the previous church. Other notable projects of by Da Roza include the Ukrainian Catholic Church of St. Michael, Tyndall, Manitoba (1964) and the former Mountain Avenue Bank of Montreal, Winnipeg (1971).
