= Don Proch =

Canadian artist (born 1942)

- Born: Donald Proch; 1942; Hamilton, Ontario
- Education: Bachelor of Fine Arts and a Bachelor of Education from the University of Manitoba (1966)
- Known for: multimedia artist

Don Proch DCL (born 1942) is a multimedia artist known for complex installations, masks, and silkscreen prints. His work is centered in his imaginings of the Canadian Prairies combined with references to the Asessippi Valley, his life there and with global concerns of climate change.

== Career ==
Proch was born in Hamilton, Ontario and raised on a farm in the Asessippi Valley. He took art at the University of Manitoba where Ivan Eyre who taught him basic drawing was of particular importance to him and received his Bachelor of Fine Arts and a Bachelor of Education from the university in 1966. He taught art in high school from 1967 to 1970, then in 1970 won a purchase award from the Winnipeg Art Gallery for Asessippi Tread (1970, Winnipeg Art Gallery), which he called a silverpoint drawing but is three-dimensional and composed of graphite, fibreglass, wood and steel.

He first showed at the Winnipeg Art Gallery in the Twelfth Winnipeg Biennial in 1970. In 1972 the Gallery held a solo exhibition of his work entitled The Legend of Asessippi: Space Drawings by the Ophtalmia Co. of Inglis, Manitoba (1972). To complete this project, he enlisted what he called the Ophtalmia Company of Inglis, a team of artists, friends and relatives for help. They became known as the Ophthamalia Company of Inglis (his hometown). The original group included his father Dymetro (shop foreman), William H. Lobchuk (printer and director of The Grand Western Canadian Screen Shop), Thomas Melnick (sander/finisher), Steve Chachula (welder), Bertie Duncan (bird sculptor). Others joined including Doug Proch, artist Kelly Clark, Glen Tinley, Ernest Mayer, Gord Bonnell and Patrice.

His work was included in 1973 in Canada Trajectories at the Musée d'Art Moderne de Paris and in the same year in Manitoba Mainstream at the National Gallery of Canada. Numerous shows were held at the Winnipeg Art Gallery after the 1972 show, beginning with several group shows, then in the winter of 1975 the Gallery exhibited his prints, sculptures and masks in a show titled Asessippi Clouds. In 1976 his work was chosen for exhibition at Place Bonaventure in Montreal for the all-Canadian Olympic show. In 1977 he completed a mural for the Winnipeg Convention Centre of a prairie scene, half-fashioned in chromed steel. His work then went on a travelling show organized by the Winnipeg Art Gallery, titled Don Proch (1977). His work was also included in major shows at the National Gallery of Canada such as Pluralities: 1980 = Pluralités: 1980 (1980) and internationally in group shows in Brussels (1998) and elsewhere. In 2009 his work was included in Flight Dreams, an exhibition organized by the Art Gallery of Nova Scotia.

In 2019, Proch's silkscreen prints were included in Superscreen: The Making of an Artist-Run Counterculture and the Grand Western Canadian Screen Shop, organized by the MacKenzie Art Gallery in Regina in partnership with the School of Art Gallery at the University of Manitoba. In 2021, Mayberry Fine Art in Winnipeg had a show of Proch`s work titled Asessippi Chrome, the first time Proch presented a solo exhibit locally since the 1990s.

His fonds is in the library of the University of Regina.

== Work ==
Through his work which includes silkscreen prints made at the Grand Canadian Western Screen Shop, Proch has imagined a characteristic image of the prairies but added a perception of the environment and climate change. His installation-sculpture and masks often have a moulded fibreglass structure on which he worked with silverpoint, graphic and colored pencil, and to which he added found objects from his environment. He also has created art homages to Canadian people, events and places, such as Jackson Beardy who, for five years (1979-1984) had the studio above his.

For the first 20 years of his career he worked in black and white, then he began incorporating more colour, using coloured pencils to create landscapes. His 2021 Asessippi Chrome exhibition captured each stage of that development.

== Collections ==
His work is in public collections across Canada, including the National Gallery of Canada, the Art Gallery of Ontario, and the Winnipeg Art Gallery. He has been represented by Mayberry Fine Art in Winnipeg since 2002.

== Honours ==
In 2019, St John's College at the University of Manitoba bestowed on him an Honorary Doctorate (DCL).
