= Jean Paul Lemieux =

Canadian painter (1904–1990)

Jean Paul Lemieux CC RCA GOQ
- Lemieux in 1977
- Born: Marie Joseph Jean Paul Lemieux; November 18, 1904; Quebec City, Canada
- Died: December 7, 1990 (aged 86); Quebec City, Canada
- Education: École des beaux-arts de Montréal; École du meuble
- Spouse: Madeleine Des Rosiers

Jean Paul Lemieux, CC RCA GOQ (French pronunciation: [ʒɑ̃ pɔl ləmjø]; 1904 – 1990) was one of the foremost twentieth century painters in Canada. He worked in several different styles, as represented by his five artistic periods. His career is deeply connected to Quebec City, where Lemieux lived, taught, and painted.

== Biography ==
He was born in Quebec City, where he also died. He was raised in Quebec City until 1916, when his family moved to Berkeley, California. In 1917, the family returned to Quebec and settled in Montreal.

As a youth, Lemieux created watercolours, taking lessons in his teens from an "English lady" in Montreal. From 1926 to 1934, Jean Paul Lemieux studied with Edwin Holgate and others at the Montreal School of Fine Arts. In 1929, he traveled to Europe with his mother. In Paris, he studied advertising and art and met other artists. Lemieux took teaching positions from 1934, first at his former school, then in 1935 at the École du meuble. In 1937, he moved to Quebec City and taught at the École des Beaux-Arts de Québec until his retirement in 1965.

His connections at that period include other major artists associated with these schools, such as Alfred Pellan and Paul-Émile Borduas. In 1960, works by Lemieux along with Edmund Alleyn, Graham Coughtry, Frances Loring and Albert Dumouchel represented Canada at the Venice Biennale. In 1967, he had his first major retrospective of over 100 paintings organized by the Montreal Museum of Fine Arts, which toured to the Musée du Québec (now MNBAQ) and the National Gallery of Canada.

=== Awards and honours ===
Jean Paul Lemieux received several awards for his works, including the Louis-Philippe Hébert prize in 1971 and the Molson Prize for the Canada Council for the Arts in 1974. In 1968, he became a Companion of the Order of Canada. He was also a member of the Royal Canadian Academy. In 1997, he was posthumously made a Grand Officer of the National Order of Quebec.

== Artistic career ==
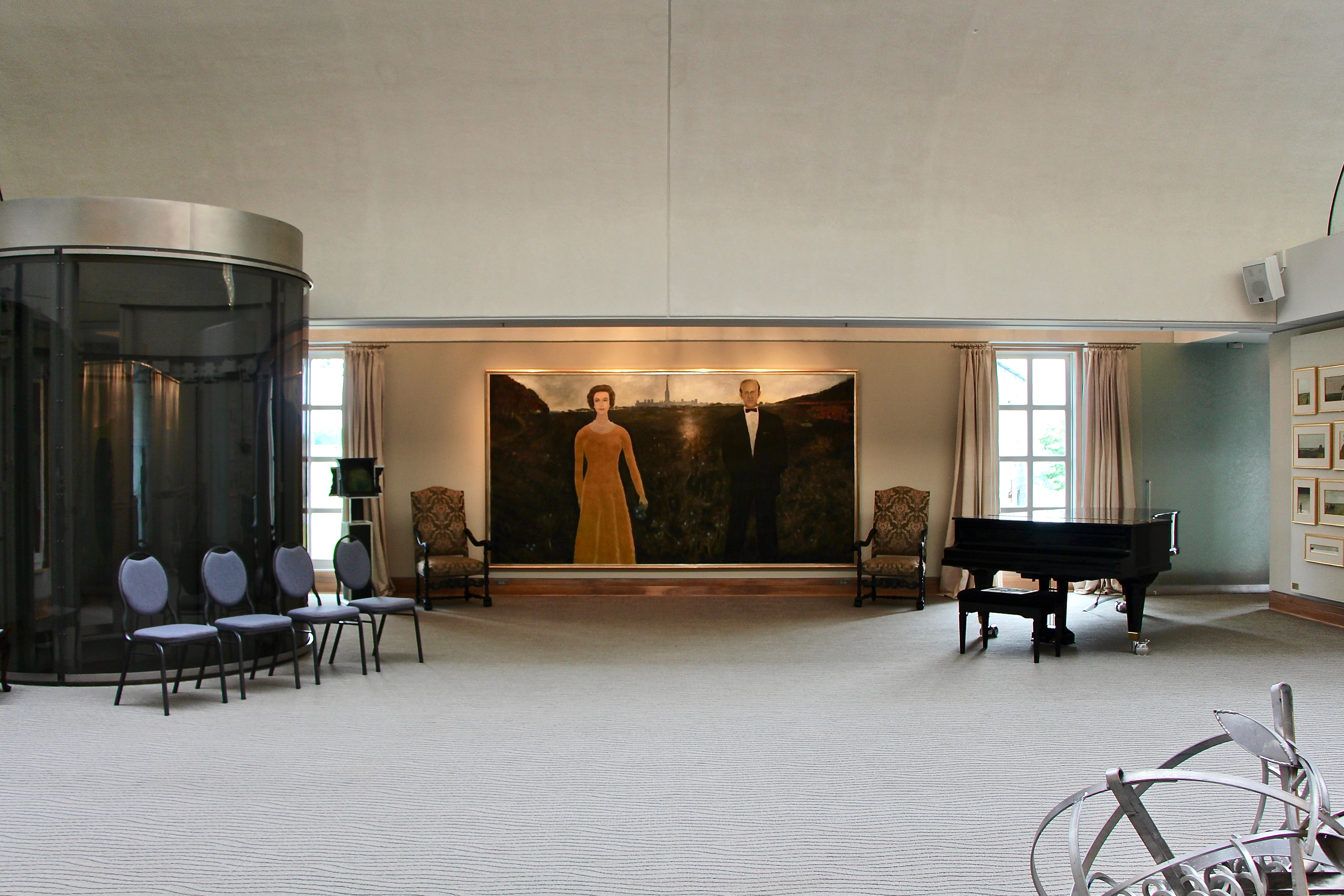
Lemieux's 1979 work affectionate memory images, in the monarch's and governor general's residence at la Citadelle, in Quebec City

Lemieux was a representational artist whose painting career sometimes had echoes of folk art but, in 1956, at the age of 52, he changed his subject matter and refined his technique. The paintings which followed are among his best known. They usually feature emblematic scenes of French Canada, often combined with a sense of the vast spaces of his homeland. Lemieux was also passionate about mural art, as it democratized the accessibility of art. He has several murals in and about Quebec City.

=== Works - a selection ===
- Marine, Baie Saint-Paul, 1935
- Notre-Dame protégeant Québec, 1941
- Portrait de l’artiste à Beauport-Est, 1943
- Le Far West, 1955
- Les Parques, 1962
- L’été de 1914, 1965
- Her Majesty Queen Elizabeth II and His Royal Highness The Duke of Edinburgh, 1979
- Dies Irae, 1982–83

=== The five periods ===
The Musée national des beaux-arts du Québec and other sources divide Lemieux's career into five periods:

- Montreal period (1926–1937), marked by realistic naturalism influenced by Quebec regionalism and, later, European post impressionism.
- Primitive period (1940–1947), focused on anecdote and accumulated scenic detail.
- Minimalist period (1951–1955), with cubist structures, which signaled a major turning point in the artist's career.
- Classical period (1956–1970), with figures fuelled by the sources and practices of abstract art. It is in this period that Lemieux produced the paintings of lonely figures in desolate, bleak landscapes for which he is so well known today. The landscapes may suggest to some the vast northern spaces of Canada.
- Expressionist period (after 1970), presenting humanity living in a post nuclear attack world.

== Legacy ==
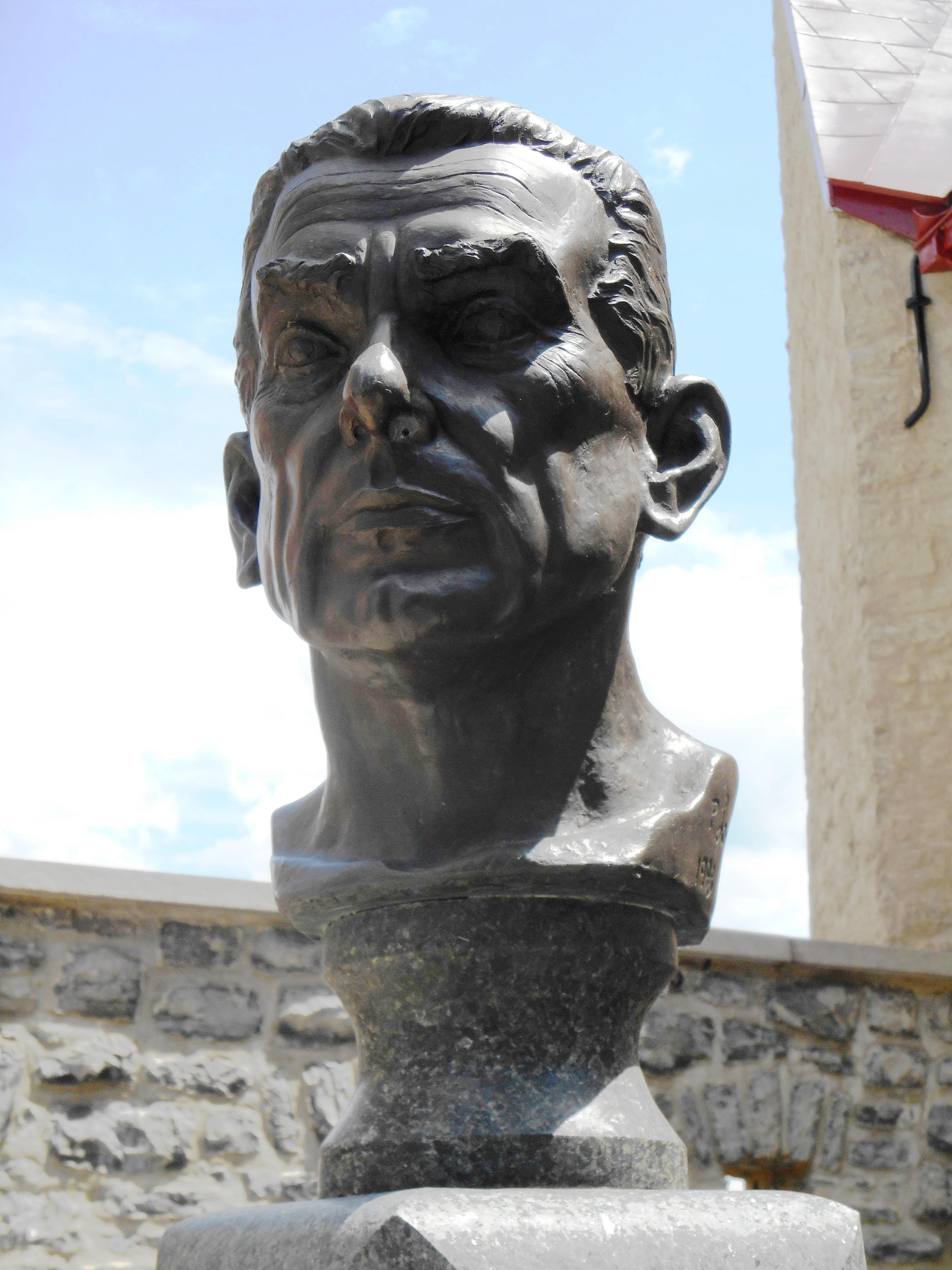
Jean-Paul Lemieux monument in Québec, Canada

A set of postage stamps depicting three works by Lemieux, Self-portrait (1974), June Wedding (1972) and Summer (1959) were issued by Canada Post on October 22, 2004. The stamps were released on the day that a retrospective of his work organized to recognize the centenary of the artist's birth opened at the National Gallery of Canada. The Musée national des beaux-arts du Québec (abbreviated as MNBAQ) held the exhibition Jean Paul Lemieux: Silence and Space in 2022.

The Jean Paul Lemieux and Madeleine Des Rosiers fonds, R6612, is in Library and Archives Canada.

== Record sale prices ==
In 2011, Nineteen Ten Remembered, 42 x 57 1/2 in 106.7 x 146 cm, oil on canvas. sold for: $2,340,000 CDN (premium included) at the Fall 2011 Heffel Auction, 1st Session on Thursday, November 24, 2011.
