= Jennifer Alleyn =

Canadian film maker

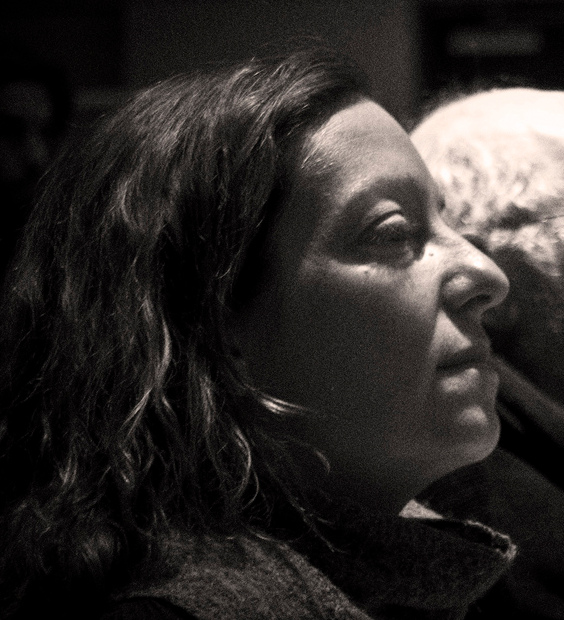
Jennifer Alleyn

Jennifer Alleyn (born May 7, 1969) is a Canadian artist, filmmaker, writer and photographer who lives and works in Montreal.

== Biography ==
The daughter of artist Edmund Alleyn, she was born in Switzerland. She studied film at Concordia University. Alleyn worked as a journalist for the newspapers Le Devoir, Montreal Gazette and La Presse and for Elle Québec magazine. She travelled around the world while participating in the Radio-Canada television program La Course destination monde.

Alleyn wrote and directed a segment, "Aurore et Crépuscule", of the 1996 film Cosmos, which was included in the Directors' Fortnight at the Cannes Film Festival. Her 2003 film Svanok was awarded the prize for best short fiction film by the Association québécoise des critiques de cinéma.

In 2006, she made a film about her father, My Father's Studio (L’atelier de mon père, sur les traces d’Edmund Alleyn); the film was named best Canadian film at the International Festival of Films on Art in Montreal and also received a Prix Gémeaux. She directed the 2010 film Dix fois Dix about painter Otto Dix, which received the Prix Tremplin pour le monde ARTV.

In 2018, she directed and produced Impetus, a hybrid drama feature described by Denis Villeneuve as " Playful like a Godard or Varda film. Brilliant and moving". The film premiered at Slamdance, Utah and Torino, Italy. Alleyn was awarded the 2019 PRIX CREATION, by the Observatoire du Cinéma au Québec for "her outstanding contribution to Quebec cinema".

Her latest film, Kairos, is slated to premiere as the closing film of the 2026 Rendez-vous Québec Cinéma.
