= William H. Lobchuk =

Canadian artist (born 1942)

- Born: William Harry Lobchuk; 20 December 1942; Neepawa, Manitoba, Canada
- Known for: printmaker, activist for artists' rights

William H. Lobchuk RCA, known as Bill Lobchuk (born 1942) was one of the first people in Canada to found a printshop which made printmaking facilities available to contemporary artists. In 1968 he opened the Screen Shop at 50 Princess Street in Winnipeg with partner Len Anthony, which led to the founding of The Grand Western Canadian Screen Shop in 1973. It was the first print shop of its kind in Western Canada and a focus of printmaking production and distribution for artists, both in the Prairies and Canada-wide.

Other early founders of printshops include Richard Lacroix, founder of Atelier Libre (1964) and the Guilde Graphique (1966), and Pierre Ayot, founder of Atelier Libre 848 (1966) (renamed Atelier Graff in 1969), in Montreal, Jack Lemmon and Robert Rogers who founded the NSCAD Lithography Workshop in 1969, and Richard Sewell and Barbara Hall who founded Open Studio in Toronto in 1970.

== Early years ==
Lobchuk was born in Neepawa, Manitoba and studied with Ken Lochhead at the University of Manitoba, graduating in 1966. In 1968 he opened the Screen Shop at 50 Princess Street in Winnipeg. By the early 70s he operated the Screen Shop, the Printmakers Gallery and the Sunnyside Sign Company. These were replaced by the Grand Western Canadian (GWC) Screen Shop which he formed with partner Len Anthony, a knowledgeable technician and master printer, in 1973, hoping to make original art more affordable and generate revenue for artists.

== Grand Western Canadian Screen Shop ==
From 1973 to 1987, the screen shop provided a "transformative catalyst in contemporary printmaking" and social and cultural hub for artists in Winnipeg such as such as Ted (E.J) Howorth, Chris Finn, Don Proch and Tony Tascona; from Saskatchewan David Thauberger, Victor Cicansky, Joe Fafard and Russell Yuristy; and from Quebec Pierre Ayot as well as guests such as Daphne Odjig and General Idea and many others to make and distribute their prints. Screenprinting was its main mode of production; a natural choice because of its economy and anti-elitist ethos. Lobchuk and other artists printing at the GWC Screen Shop created two significant co-operative projects: The Great Western Canadian Series '78 and Series '80. Canada. It was a place for artists to try experimental work such as printing on velvet, making large scale prints and using photograph images. Lobchuk adds, "We did all kinds of crazy things."

== Selected exhibitions ==
In 1970, Lobchuk began to exhibit his prints and encourage other western printmakers to do so in group shows in Manitoba with institutions such as the Winnipeg Art Gallery, and University of Manitoba, across Canada, and abroad. In 2010, The Grand Western Canadian Screen Shop Collection: the Bill Lobchuk Donation, curated by Robert Epp was held at Gallery One One One in Winnipeg. In 2019, the MacKenzie Art Gallery in Regina in partnership with the School of Art Gallery at the University of Manitoba organized Superscreen: The Making of an Artist-Run Counterculture and the Grand Western Canadian Screen Shop which sought to capture the innovation and diversity of Canadian cultural production from the 1960s-1980s and brought together art work and ephemera from in and around the Screen Shop to celebrate the spirit of a "rebellious, fertile and overlooked chapter in Canadian art history".

== Selected collections and memberships ==
Lobchuk’s work is in such public collections as the Art Gallery of Nova Scotia, the Winnipeg Art Gallery, and the MacKenzie Art Gallery. He was elected to the Royal Canadian Academy of Arts (R.C.A.) in 1996. Lobchuk is represented by the Fleet Galleries and Guevich Fine Art Gallery in Winnipeg and the Slate Fine Art Gallery in Regina. His prints are also carried by the Winnipeg Art Gallery.

== Arts organizations ==
Lobchuk gave his time generously to Professional Arts Organizations. He was elected President, Canadian Artist’s Representation CARFAC, Manitoba in 1972, national representative in 1976, and national director in 1978. He continued to work with CARFAC MB in different capacities from 1999 to 2005. He also taught printmaking at the University of Manitoba (1973-1974), served as a member of the Canada Council Art Bank juries (from 1973 to1989), as a Visiting Guest Artist, Canada Council Art Bank Commission, and in the 1980s served on boards of magazines and cultural centres. In 1980, he was appointed fundraiser for the Jack Chambers Memorial Foundation and from 2002 to 2007 served as Executive Director.

== Fonds ==
Lobchuk's fonds is in the University of Regina Archives & Special Collections Reference code 88-75.
