= Patricia Martin Bates =

Canadian artist (born 1927)

- Born: Patricia Martin; June 25, 1927 (age 98); Saint John, New Brunswick, Canada
- Education: Mount Allison University, Sackville, New Brunswick; Académie Royale des Beaux-Arts, Brussels and the Royal Academy of Fine Arts, Antwerp; the Sorbonne, Paris; the Pratt Graphic Art Center, New York
- Spouse: Al Bates (m. 1948)

Patricia Martin Bates RCA D.F.A. also known as Pat Martin Bates (born June 25, 1927) is a Canadian artist and educator.

== Biography ==
Born in Saint John, New Brunswick, Martin began her formal art studies at the age of 12 with Stanley Royale, who taught at Mount Allison University. Bates subsequently studied at the Académie Royale des Beaux-Arts and the Royal Academy of Fine Arts in Belgium, at the Sorbonne in Paris, and at the Pratt Graphic Art Center in New York. She married Al Bates in 1948.

She is a printmaker, noted for her embossing technique, and in the 1960s, became well known for her Plexiglas cube sculptures which incorporated print processes. Her work is often inspired by Occidental themes or religions. Bates was a member of the group in Victoria known as the Victoria Limners Society, a group of visual artists based in Victoria, B.C. (1971-2008). Bates played a role in the art community locally: she was the founder of what became XChanges Gallery and Studios in Victoria, a non-profit artists' cooperative operating a gallery and studios for practicing artists, among other initiatives.

Bates had many exhibitions, both nationally and internationally. In 1986, an exhibition of her work was shown in Vancouver. In 2005, a retrospective exhibition titled Pat Martin Bates: Destinations, Navigations, Illuminations was shown at the Art Gallery of Greater Victoria. In 2019, her a 50-year survey exhibition titled Inscape Golden Timeless Threads - Points of Starlight Silence was shown at the Victoria Arts Council as a special project in honour of the Council's 50th anniversary year.

From 1964 on, she was a professor at the University of Victoria and taught there for more than 30 years. In 1991, she received the University of Victoria Alumni Association annual award for teaching excellence. She received an Honorary Doctorate from the University of Victoria in 1994 for her years of service and achievements. Her work is included in the collections of the Art Gallery of Greater Victoria, the University of Victoria, the Art Gallery of Guelph, the National Gallery of Canada, the Museum of Modern Art in New York, and the Fine Arts Museums of San Francisco, among others.

She received the Queen Elizabeth II Silver Jubilee Medal, the Zachenta medal in Poland, the Global Graphics Award in Holland, the Gold Medal at the International Biennale of Prints and the International Print Art of Norway Gold Medal, and various awards from the Canada Council, as well as the Legacy Prize from Victoria. She was elected to the Royal Canadian Academy of Arts in 2008. The Canadian Federation of University Women Victoria esteemed her by establishing, in 1985, the Pat Martin Bates Scholarship in Visual Arts.

== Publications ==
- —— (1965). Prints. Saint John, New Brunswick: New Brunswick Museum, Art Department. OCLC 497807235.
- —— (1972). Black & white almost. Black & White Press. OCLC 11628534.
- ——; Chu, Gene; Urquhart, Tony (1974). 41st Annual Exhibition of Prints and Drawings : November 1st-25th, 1974, London Public Library and Art Museum. Société canadienne des arts graphiques. Exposition annuelle. London, Ontario, CA: La Société. OCLC 726515735.
- ——; Urquhart, Tony (1975). Pat Martin Bates : perforations silencieuses, gravures. Tony Urquhart : paysages interdimensionnels, sculptures : [exposition], 2 octobre-23 novembre 1975 (in French). Paris: Centre culturel canadien. ISBN 9782900434055. OCLC 461431022.
- ——; Hurtig, Annette; Page, P K; Saddlemeyer, Ann (2005). Pat Martin Bates : destinations, navigations, illuminations. Victoria: Art Gallery of Greater Victoria. OCLC 67402042.
- ——; Coldwell, Joan (2010). It is I, Patricia : an artist's childhood. Sidney, B.C.: Hedgerow Press. ISBN 9781459340275. OCLC 716059254.
- Bovey, Patricia; —— (2014) [2012]. Balancing on a thread. Calgary: Frontenac House. ISBN 9781897181614. OCLC 794300779, 890946301.
