= Albert Dumouchel =

Canadian printmaker (1916–1971)

- Born: April 15, 1916; Valleyfield, Quebec, Canada
- Died: January 11, 1971 (aged 54); St-Antoine-sur-le-Richelieu, Quebec
- Occupations: printmaker, painter and teacher
- Spouse: Suzanne Beaudoin

Albert Dumouchel (April 15, 1916 – January 11, 1971) was a Canadian printmaker, painter and teacher. Dumouchel also was a photographer and musician. His work as an artist ranged from abstract to figurative.

== Life and work ==
Albert Dumouchel was born into a family of tradesmen at Bellerive, a working-class parish in the municipality of Valleyfield, Quebec. He was educated at the Séminaire Saint Thomas D'Aquin de Valleyfield, known today as the Collège de Valleyfield. From the age of 8, he studied music. He studied engraving in Montreal, etching and lithography in Paris, sculpture in Valleyfield, and with Alfred Pellan (1944–1945). From 1936 to 1949, he taught art classes at the Séminaire de Valleyfield. In 1940, he became a textile designer at Montreal Cottons in Valleyfield.

He also taught drawing, art history, publicity and photography at the Montréal's Institute des arts graphiques (now École des arts graphiques) which had just been founded in Montreal, Quebec, Canada (known today as Collège Ahuntsic) (1942–1960). He set up an engraving workshop at the École des Beaux-Arts in Montreal, and was the head of the graphics division (1960–1969). His art teaching influenced, even inspired, many artists. The graphics department at the École des Beaux Arts in Montreal has been called the "best graphics training ground in the country".

In Montréal in 1945, he participated in the Exquisite corpse (Cadavre exquis) experiments with Léon Bellefleur, Jean Benôit, Jean Léonard, Mimi Parent and Alfred Pellan. Between 1947 and 1951, he published the series "Les Ateliers d'arts graphiques", the review of Montréal's École des arts graphiques.

He participated in the activities of the Montreal surrealists. In 1948, he signed the manifesto Prisme d'yeux, which defended diverse approaches to art-making, and later made contributions to the first publications of Roland Giguere's Éditions Erta. Between 1949 and 1954, his lithographs illustrated Giguère's Faire naître (1949), Les Nuits abat-jour (1950), and Les Armes blanches. Giguère interested Dumouchel in the Cobra movement, and his work appeared in the Revue internationale de l'art expérimental - Cobra (1954), and in Phases de l'art contemporain(1955), the review published by poet and surrealist critic Édouard Jaguer. In March 1953, during an exhibition of paintings and drawings at the University of British Columbia, some sixty compositions on slides were exhibited. He exhibited his work at the Canadian Biennial from its beginning in 1955. He was one of 30 members of The Non-Figurative Artists Association of Montreal. He also took part in important exhibitions worldwide. The Montréal Musée d'art contemporain held an exhibition of his engravings in 1974.

In 1955, Dumouchel was awarded an 18-month UNESCO scholarship to study in Europe, where he pursued his research and work on printmaking. In 1960, his work and that of Edmund Alleyn, Graham Coughtry, Jean Paul Lemieux, and Frances Loring, represented Canada at the Venice Biennale. In 1964, he was awarded membership in the Florentine Academy of Fine Arts and three years later, the academy awarded him its centenary medal for services rendered to Canada.

His work is represented in such major public collections as the National Gallery of Canada, the Art Gallery of Ontario, the Musée National des Beaux-Arts du Québec, the Montreal Museum of Fine Arts, and the Victoria and Albert Museum, London, England.

== Death ==
In 1967, he left his apartment/workshop in Montreal and went to live at St-Antoine-sur-le-Richelieu where he died in 1971, during a convalescence following a surgical operation for goitre.

== Legacy ==
In 2022–2023, the Montreal Museum of Fine Arts showed a retrospective of close to 35 of his prints, drawn largely from its own collections, titled Revelations: Prints by Albert Dumouchel from the Collection of the MMFA.
