= Edmund Alleyn =

Canadian artist (1931–2004)

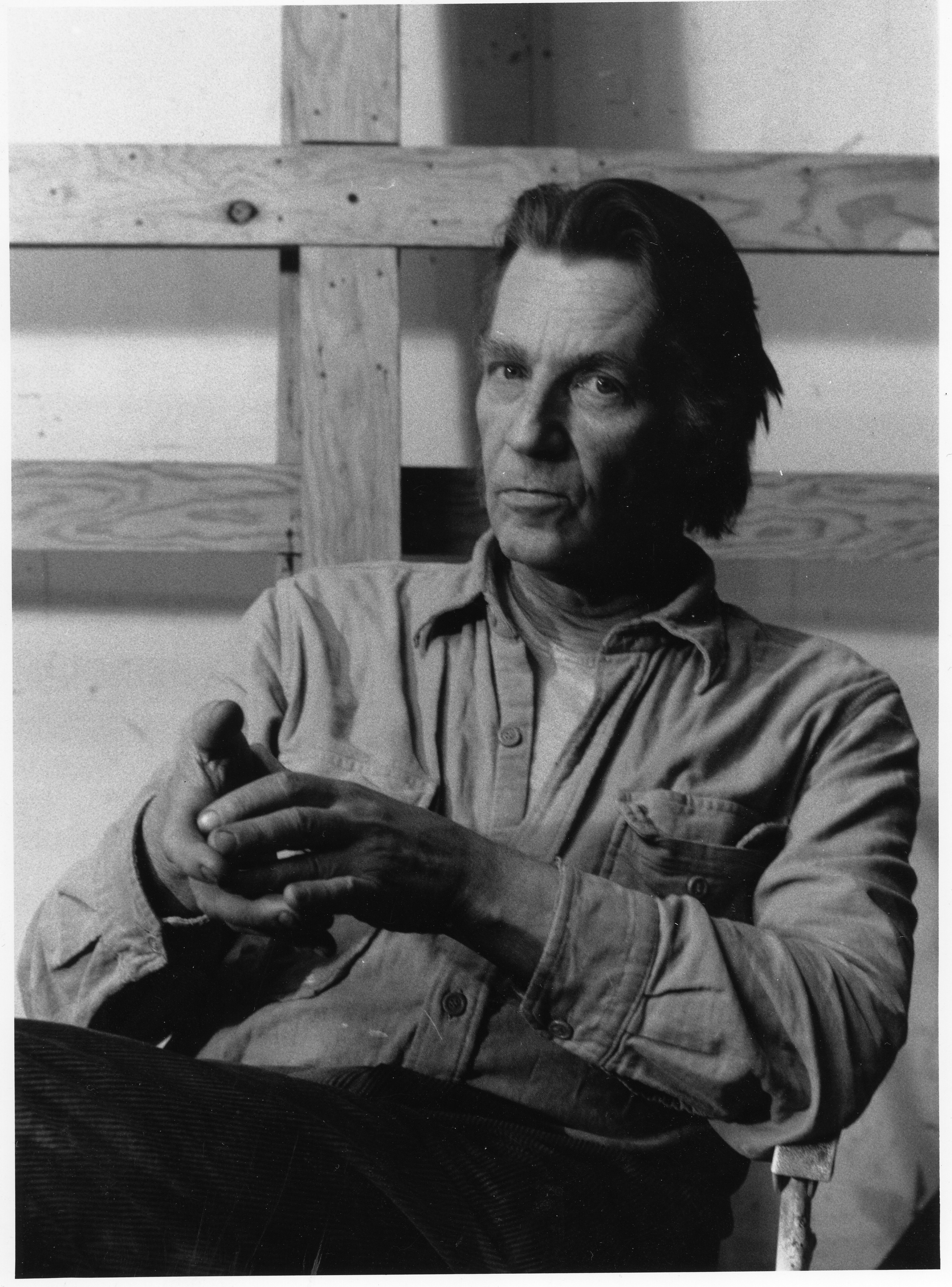
- Edmund Alleyn,1990
- Born: George Edmund Alleyn; 9 June 1931; Quebec City, Quebec, Canada
- Died: 24 December 2004 (aged 73); Montreal, Quebec, Canada
- Education: École des beaux-arts, Quebec City with Jean Paul Lemieux and Jean Dallaire
- Spouse: Anne Cherix
- Children: Jennifer Alleyn
- Website: edmundalleyn.com

Edmund Alleyn (June 09, 1931 – December 24, 2004) had an art career that underwent many stylistic changes. He explored various styles of painting including abstraction, narrative figuration, technology and pop art, as well as different media. Critics feel that his inability to be categorized marks him as contemporary. Even more important, they say that he helped remove excessive compartmentalization from art practice.

== Early years ==
Born in Québec City in 1931 to a family of English and Irish heritage, Edmund Alleyn attended the École des beaux-arts in Québec City, where he studied with Jean Paul Lemieux and Jean Dallaire. In 1955, he won the Grand Prix aux concours artistiques de la Province de Québec and a grant from the Royal Society of Canada.

== Career ==
From 1955 to 1970, Alleyn stayed in France twice for long periods of time. During this time, he at first explored lyrical abstraction. In 1958 and 1960, Alleyn was included in the selection of Canadian paintings featured in the Guggenheim International competition, and in 1959 he won the bronze medal at the São Paulo Biennale, then in 1960, with Graham Coughtry, Jean Paul Lemieux, Frances Loring, and Albert Dumouchel, he represented Canada at the Venice Biennial. In the period 1962 to 1964, Alleyn's growing interest in North American Indigenous art was reflected in ideographic and biomorphic forms and more colourful work, then by the mid-1960s he created "cybernetic" figurative painting. Afterwards, inspired by the 1968 uprisings in Paris, he experimented with film and technological sculpture, moving toward an imagery that came from technology, electronics and mass media. His Introscaphe 1 (1970) was one of the first multimedia works ever made. Shown at the Museum of Modern Art in Paris, it consists of an egg-shaped capsule with space for one viewer, which visitors were invited to enter and go through a multisensory experience.

On his return to Canada, he was struck by the changes caused by the Quebec's Quiet Revolution and in the early 1970s, created proto-installations depicting realistic, colourful figures taken from photographs of crowds attending the Expo 67 site, which he then painted on Plexiglas and installed in front of representations of sunsets. These he called his "Quebec Suite". Eventually he created the moody private landscapes of his large-scale paintings done between 1983 and 1990.

In 1990, he returned to figuration in his "Indigo" series which he exhibited at the Galerie d'art Lavalin and at the 49th Parallel in New York. At the Musée des Beaux-Arts in Sherbrooke in 2004, he showed his final series, "Les Éphmérides" (1995–2004) which consisted of 12 large canvases as well as ink washes that echoed his abstract and figurative work of the 1960s. Alleyn said of his work,

My works are an aide-memoire for life; a fragmentary antidote against amnesia, which kills more effectively – and softly – that the bullet shot by the elite. Edmund Alleyn, By Day, By Night (Les éditions du passage, 2013)

Alleyn had many solo exhibitions and participated in important group shows both in Canada and abroad. His works are included in the collections of Musée national des beaux-arts du Québec, Montreal Museum of Fine Arts, Musée d'art contemporain de Montréal and the National Gallery of Canada, among others. He is represented by Galerie Simon Blais in Montreal.

From shortly after his return in 1970 from France until his retirement in 1991, he held a teaching position at the University of Ottawa, to which he commuted, maintaining his studio in Montreal. Alleyn died of cancer on 24 December 2004, at the age of 73.

== Major solo exhibitions during his lifetime ==
- The introscaphe 1, Museum of Modern Art in Paris, 1970
- Indigo, Lavalin Art Gallery and 49 Parallel, New York, 1990
- The horizons of expectations, 1955-1995 (retrospective), Musée d'art de Joliette and Musée national des beaux-arts du Québec, 1997
- Les Éphémérides, Sherbrooke Museum of Fine Arts, 2004

== Awards ==
- 1955 Grand Prize at the Concours Artistiques of the province of Quebec
- 1955 grant from the Royal Society of Canada
- 1958 and 1960, Alleyn was included in the selection of Canadian paintings featured in the Guggenheim International competition
- 1959 bronze medal at the São Paulo Biennale
- 1960 represented Canada at the Venice Biennale with Graham Coughtry, Jean Paul Lemieux, Frances Loring, and Albert Dumouchel

== Movies about Edmund Alleyn ==
- L'Introscaphe, Charles Chaboud, 10 min, Bibliothèque et Archives nationales du Québec, 1971.
- The horizons of expectations: reflection on painting, 15 min, Musée national des beaux-arts du Québec, 1995.
- Imagine the Nothing, Jennifer Alleyn, The Other's Films, 8 min, 2001.
- My Father's Studio, Jennifer Alleyn, Amazon Film, 72 min, 2007.

== Legacy ==
In 2016, the Musée d'art contemporain de Montréal organized a second retrospective titled Dans mon atelier, je suis plusieurs (In My Studio, I am Many), curated by Mark Lanctôt.

== Bibliography ==
- Lanctôt, Mark; Asselin, Olivier; Bonin, Vuncent; Lapointe, Gilles; Weber-Houde, Aude (2016). Edmund Alleyn: In My Studio I Am Many (English ed.). Montreal: Musée d'art contemporain de Montréal.
- Lapointe, Gilles (2017). Edmund Alleyn: Biographie. Montreal: University of Montreal Press.
