= Winnipeg Art Gallery =

Public art museum in Winnipeg, Manitoba

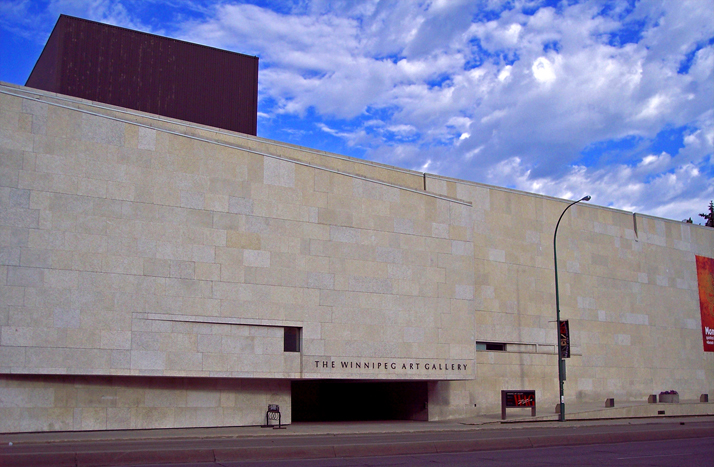
- Winnipeg Art Gallery
- Established: 16 December 1912; 113 years ago (Note: The following date is the date the Winnipeg Museum of Fine Art opened to the public. The present museum was incorporated on 6 May 1963, although the lineage of the present Winnipeg Art Gallery, and its permanent collection originates from the institutio「」n founded in 1912.)
- Location: 300 Memorial Boulevard, Winnipeg, Manitoba, Canada
- Coordinates: 49°53′22″N 97°09′02″W
- Type: Art museum
- Visitors: 160,000 (2007)
- Curators: Riva Symko, Marie Anne Redhead, and Darlene Wight (Note: Symko serves as the museum's curator for Canadian art, Redhead as the curator of contemporary and Indigenous art, and Wight as the curator for Inuit art. In addition to serving as a curator of Canadian art, Symko also serves as the museum's head of collections and exhibitions.)
- Architects: Gustavo da Roza (main building); Michael Maltzan (Qaumajuq)
- Public transit access: Winnipeg Transit; F6 D19
- Website: wag.ca

The Winnipeg Art Gallery (WAG) is an art museum in Winnipeg, Manitoba, Canada. Its permanent collection includes over 24,000 works from Canadian, Indigenous Canadian, and international artists. The museum also holds the world's largest collection of Inuit art. In addition to exhibits for its collection, the museum has organized and hosted a number of travelling arts exhibitions. Its building complex consists of a main building that includes 11,000 square metres (120,000 sq ft) of indoor space and the adjacent 3,700-square-metre (40,000 sq ft) Qaumajuq building.

The present institution was formally incorporated in 1963, although it traces its origins to the Winnipeg Museum of Fine Arts, an art museum opened to the public in 1912 by the Winnipeg Development and Industrial Bureau. The bureau opened the Winnipeg School of Arts in the following year, and operated the art museum and art school until 1923, when the two entities were incorporated as the Winnipeg Gallery and School of Arts. In 1926, the Winnipeg Art Gallery Association was formed to assist the institution in operating its museum component. The Winnipeg Gallery and School of Art was dissolved in 1950, although its collection was loaned indefinitely to the Winnipeg Art Gallery Association, who continued to exhibit it.

In 1963, the Winnipeg Art Gallery Association was formally incorporated as the Winnipeg Art Gallery by the Legislative Assembly of Manitoba. The museum moved to its present location in September 1971, with the opening of a purpose-built building designed by Gustavo da Roza. In 2021, the museum opened a Michael Maltzan-designed Qaumajuq building in order to house the museum's Inuit art collection.

== History ==
=== Background ===
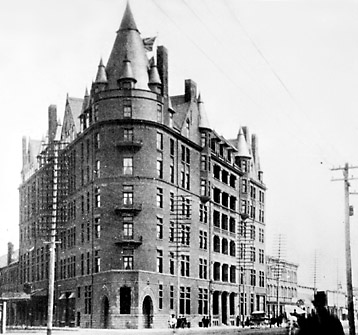
During the 1890s, the Manitoba Hotel housed the city's first art gallery

The Winnipeg Art Gallery originated in the 1890s, when Winnipeg's first serious art gallery was established in the former Manitoba Hotel at Main Street and Water Avenue. Built c. 1892 by the Northern Pacific Railway, the hotel included an artist's studio that provided a home for the new gallery.

Winnipeg arts organizer Cora Moore organized the gallery after returning from a trip to Toronto. She established a Winnipeg branch of the Women's Art Association of Canada, which supported women artists, and later organized an artists' group for men. The gallery's first exhibition opened in February 1895 and brought together works by Manitoba artists with art from Toronto, Montreal, New York, London and Paris. After operating for only four years, the gallery closed when the Manitoba Hotel was destroyed by fire in 1899, bringing Winnipeg's first experiment with a public art gallery to an end.

The gallery's closure was followed by renewed efforts to establish a permanent public art museum. In 1902, the newly formed Manitoba Society of Artists began campaigning for a civic and provincial arts institution. Support broadened six years later when the Winnipeg branch of the Western Art Association adopted a similar goal, promoting the creation of a public gallery devoted to art from Manitoba and elsewhere in Canada. These efforts culminated in 1912, when plans for the expansion of the Board of Trade Building included space for the Winnipeg Museum of Fine Arts, the direct predecessor of the Winnipeg Art Gallery.

=== Winnipeg Museum of Fine Arts (1912) ===
In April 1912, after more than a decade of campaigning by Winnipeg artists and arts organizations, the Winnipeg Development and Industrial Bureau announced that the second phase of the Board of Trade Building would include space for the Winnipeg Museum of Fine Arts.

Later that year, on 16 December 1912, the Winnipeg Museum of Fine Arts formally opened. The opening ceremony was attended by Winnipeg Mayor Richard Deans Waugh, Lieutenant Governor of Manitoba Douglas Cameron, and the president of the Winnipeg Development and Industrial Bureau.

The museum's first exhibition featured 275 works from the Royal Canadian Academy of Arts. The opening established Winnipeg's first permanent public art museum and marked the beginning of the institution that would later become the Winnipeg Art Gallery.

=== Winnipeg School of Art (1913) ===
The following year, the Winnipeg Development and Industrial Bureau opened the Winnipeg School of Art on 21 June 1913 in the same Board of Trade Building, building on the success of the Winnipeg Museum of Fine Arts.

From the beginning, the museum and school operated as separate departments under the bureau's administration, despite sharing the same building. The museum exhibited works of art, while the school provided formal art instruction.

The museum and school remained under the Winnipeg Development and Industrial Bureau for the next decade. In April 1923, the Legislative Assembly of Manitoba incorporated the institution as the Winnipeg Gallery and School of Art, making it independent of the bureau.

=== An independent institution (1923) ===
A decade after the Winnipeg Museum of Fine Arts opened, the institution became independent in April 1923 when it was incorporated by the Legislative Assembly of Manitoba as the Winnipeg Gallery and School of Art. The museum and the Winnipeg School of Art continued to operate together under the new organization.

=== Financial hardship and renewal (1926–1950) ===
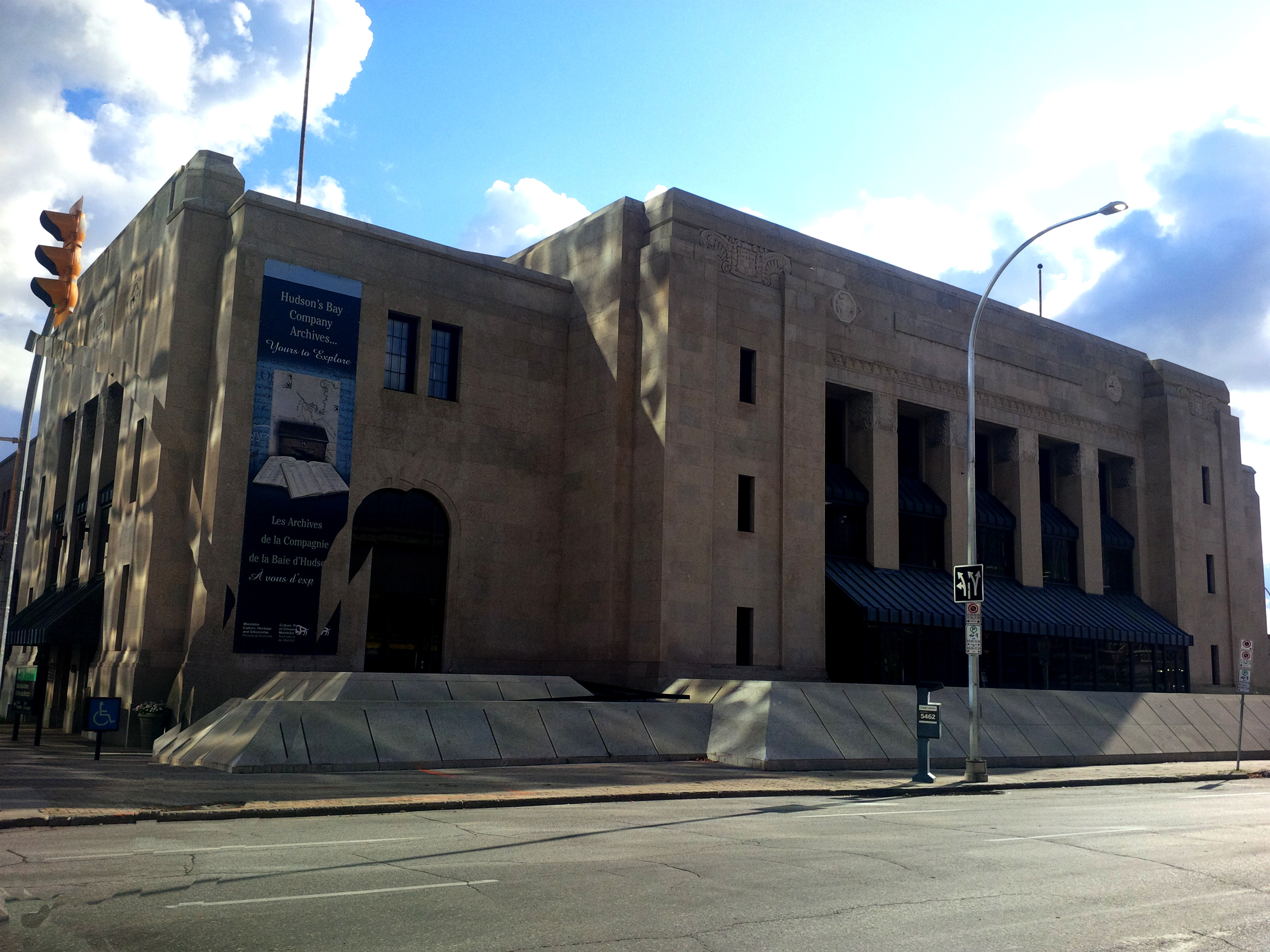
The western wing of the Civic Auditorium building exhibited the collection of the Winnipeg Gallery from 1932 to 1971

Only three years after becoming an independent institution, the Winnipeg Gallery and School of Art faced serious financial difficulties. In 1926, it suspended most museum operations, with its remaining funds used for insurance, membership campaigns and essential repairs. Although exhibitions stopped, the Winnipeg School of Art held the museum's permanent collection in trust while the gallery remained closed.

In August 1926, the Winnipeg Art Gallery Association was established to assist the museum in its operations and support its reopening.

After nearly six years, the gallery resumed normal operations on 22 April 1932 in the western wing of the Civic Auditorium, now the Archives of Manitoba. While the gallery operated from the Civic Auditorium, the Winnipeg School of Art remained in the Board of Trade Building. Three years later, the building was demolished, and the school moved in 1936 and again in 1938.

The gallery and school remained together for another 12 years. In June 1950, after nearly four decades together, the Winnipeg Gallery and School of Art was dissolved. The Winnipeg School of Art became part of the University of Manitoba, while the museum's permanent collection was loaned to the Winnipeg Art Gallery Association for an "indefinite" period. The association continued to exhibit the collection at the Civic Auditorium.

=== Winnipeg Art Gallery (1963–present) ===
On 6 May 1963, the Winnipeg Art Gallery Association was formally incorporated as the Winnipeg Art Gallery by the Legislative Assembly of Manitoba. In 1965, discussions were raised to move the art gallery from the Civic Auditorium, although the institution opposed a proposed move to the Manitoba Centennial Centre, along with the Centennial Concert Hall, and the Manitoba Museum. The Winnipeg Art Gallery criticized the proposal stating that "the politicians of the city have set various arts groups on each other, and the result has been many objections. We of the Arts Gallery are sitting tight — but we are not sitting still."

In 1967, the museum acquired a triangular plot of land across from the Civic Auditorium and launched a competition for architects to submit designs for a new building. The proposed design required the demolition of several buildings on the proposed site, including an unused service station, and the Cinema Centre building. Work on a new museum building began in 1969.

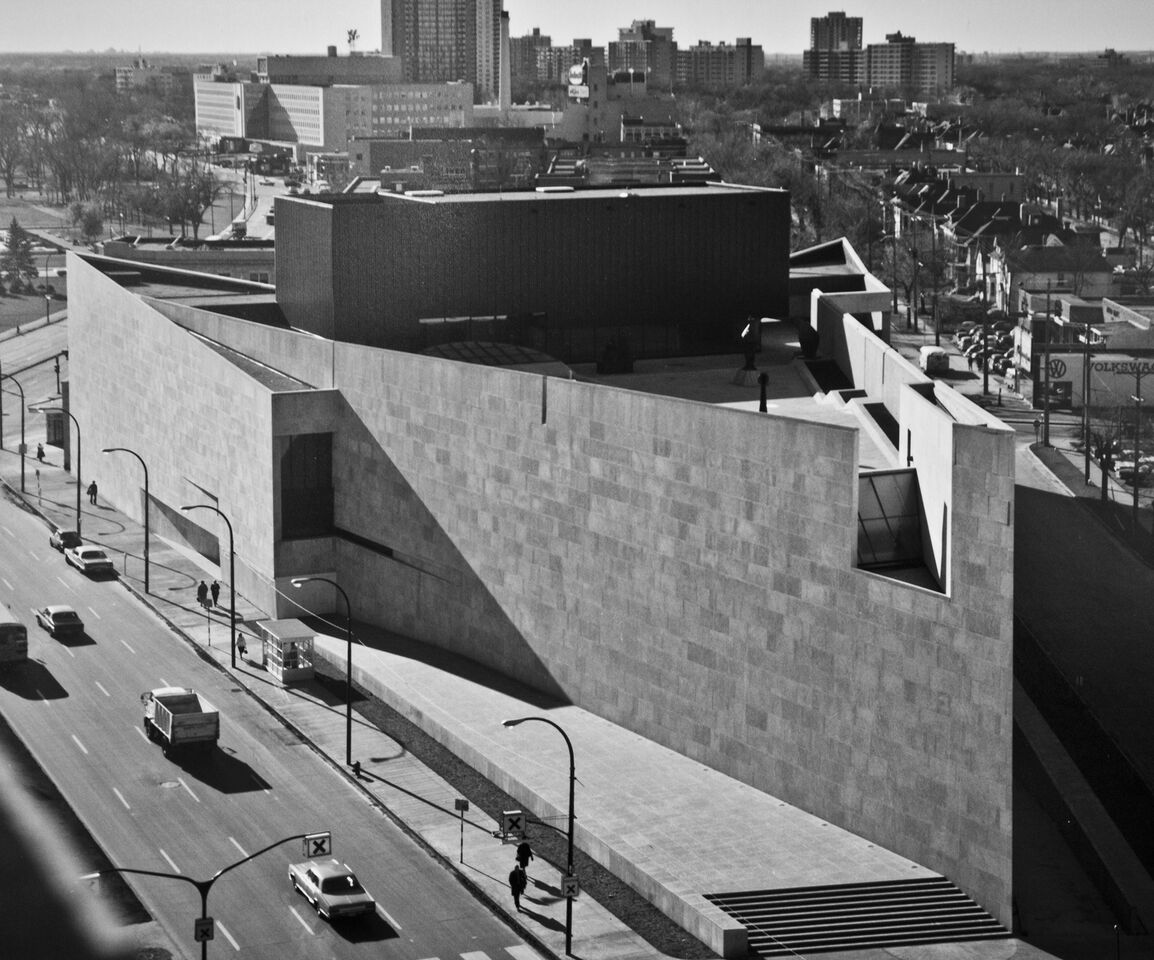
View of the new building for the art museum in 1971

The gallery moved to its present location in 1971, into a building designed by Canadian architect Gustavo Da Roza.

In October 1995, the museum expanded its property by acquiring the former Medical Mall building adjacent to its building and used it to house the museum's art studio programs.

In 2023, the museum began the process to remove the name of former director, Ferdinand Eckhardt, from its entrance hall, after reports emerged of his Nazi-linked activities in occupied Europe.

=== Qaumajuq (2012–present) ===
In 2012, the Winnipeg Art Gallery announced plans to construct Qaumajuq, a new building dedicated to Inuit art. That same year, Los Angeles architect Michael Maltzan was selected to design the project.

Three years later, in November 2015, the Government of Nunavut reached a five-year agreement with the Government of Manitoba to loan approximately 8,000 works from its art collection to the Winnipeg Art Gallery. Established in 1999, the collection had previously been housed at the Prince of Wales Northern Heritage Centre in Yellowknife after plans to construct a climate-controlled facility in Iqaluit were abandoned.

Construction began in May 2018 with a groundbreaking ceremony that featured the lighting of a qulliq, throat singing, and an Inuit drum dance. The project cost an estimated C$65 million, with C$35 million provided by the federal, provincial, and municipal governments and the remainder raised through public and private donations.

After nearly three years of construction, the building opened to the public on 25 March 2021. Named Qaumajuq, meaning "it is bright, it is lit" in Inuktitut, it became the first museum building in the world dedicated to Inuit art.

== Partnerships ==
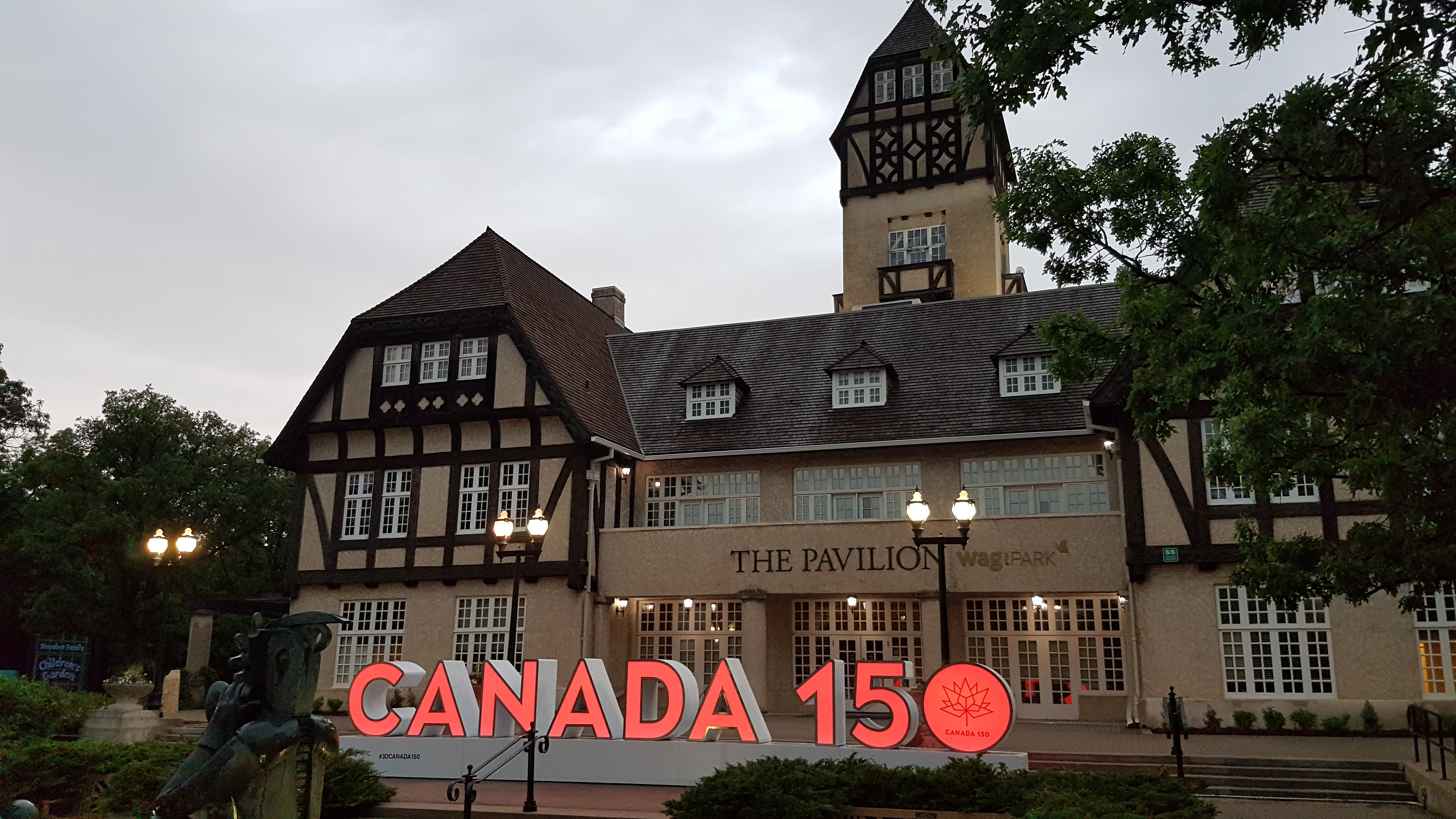
WAG@ThePark at the Assiniboine Park Pavilion. In 2016, the museum and the park's conservancy entered a partnership that saw the museum curate exhibitions at the pavilion.

In September 2016, the museum, and the Assiniboine Park Conservancy opened WAG@ThePark at the Assiniboine Park Pavilion. WAG@ThePark was opened as a partnership between the Winnipeg Art Gallery and the Assiniboine Park Conservancy, which saw the museum curate exhibitions in the building. Most of the works from the exhibitions at WAG@ThePark is from the Conservancy's collection, although some Inuit works from the museum's permanent collection were also exhibited at the pavilion.

== Architecture ==
=== Site ===
The Winnipeg Art Gallery occupies a triangular site in Downtown Winnipeg at the intersection of Memorial Boulevard and St. Mary Avenue. After operating in shared facilities for nearly 60 years, the gallery acquired the property in 1967 to construct its first purpose-built home. Construction began in 1969, and the new building opened to the public on 25 September 1971.

The gallery expanded its site in 1995 by acquiring the former Medical Mall immediately south of the original building. The Medical Mall was demolished in 2017 to make way for Qaumajuq, a 3,700-square-metre (40,000 sq ft) Inuit art centre and museum expansion that opened in March 2021. Combined, the original gallery and Qaumajuq provide approximately 15,000 square metres (160,000 sq ft) of indoor space.

=== Main building ===
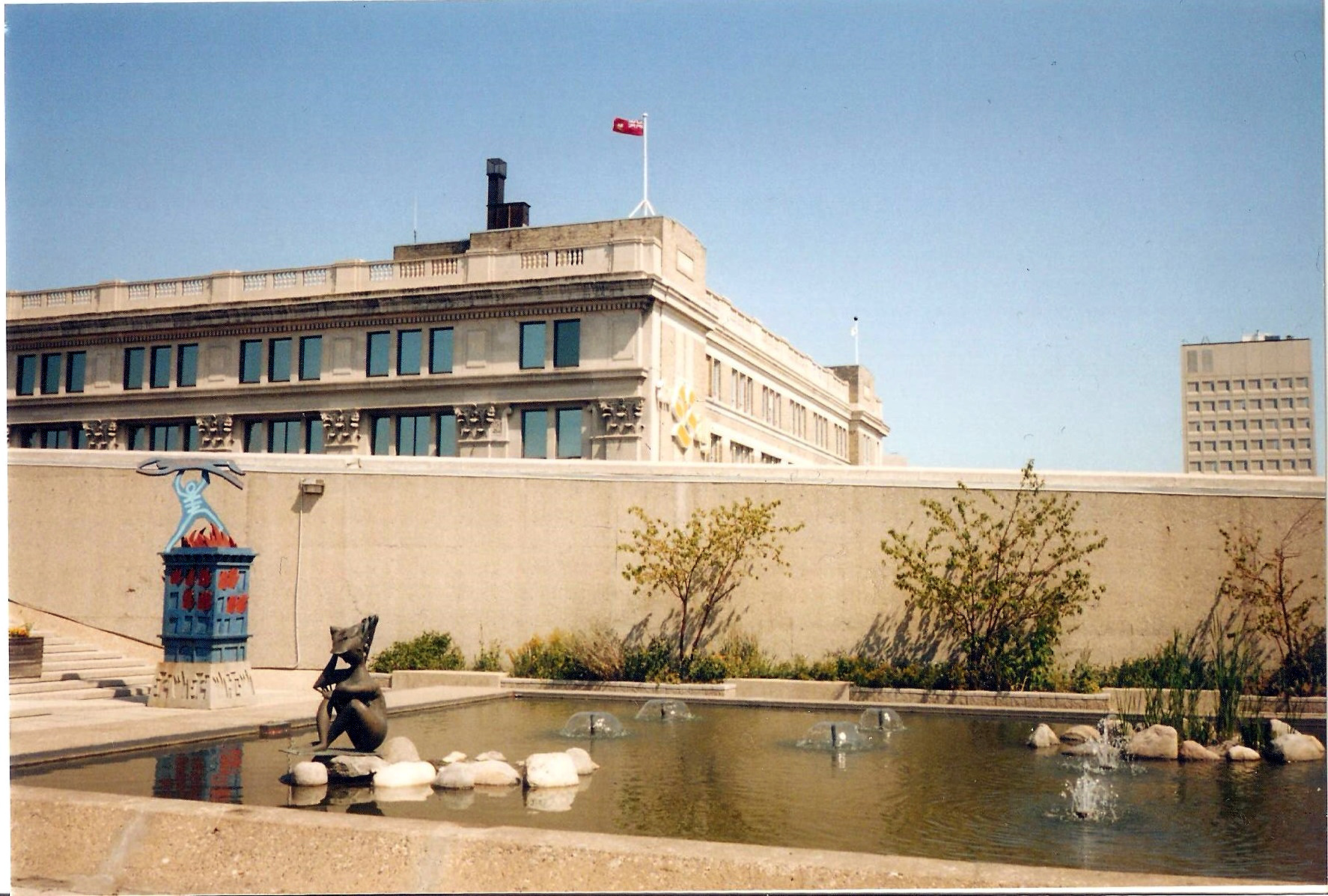
The main building of the museum complex features a rooftop garden.

The Winnipeg Art Gallery's main building was designed by Canadian architect Gustavo da Roza and officially opened by Princess Margaret, Countess of Snowdon, on 25 September 1971, nearly 60 years after the museum first welcomed visitors in 1912. It was the gallery's first purpose-built home after decades in shared facilities. Construction began in 1969 on a triangular site acquired two years earlier and cost approximately C$4.5 million. The project was funded by the federal and provincial governments, private donations, and a public fundraising campaign. During the design process, da Roza worked with the Winnipeg architectural firm Number Ten Architects, which provided architectural drafting and project management services.

Designed in the late modernist style, the building resembles an iceberg, with a low, angular profile and few exterior windows. Its sloping exterior walls reflect sunlight and emphasize bold geometric forms, while a wedge-shaped entrance projects from the main structure. The building is constructed primarily of poured reinforced concrete clad in Tyndall stone, a fossil-rich limestone quarried in southern Manitoba. Da Roza selected the stone for the load-bearing walls because he believed it reflected the character of the northern prairie landscape. Tyndall stone is also used throughout the interior on the floors, walls, and in the second-floor lounges.

The building contains approximately 11,000 square metres (120,000 sq ft) of indoor space, including 2,400 square metres (26,000 sq ft) of exhibition galleries. The ground-floor Main Hall contains the museum's lobby, gift shop, conservation laboratory, and a 320-seat auditorium. An intermediate mezzanine level houses smaller exhibition galleries, the museum's library, and administrative offices. The principal galleries occupy the third floor beneath a large skylight rising from the rooftop garden. The fourth floor provides access to the rooftop garden, while the basement houses collection storage.

When the building opened in 1971, it brought the museum's exhibition spaces, conservation laboratory, and collection storage together in a single facility, replacing previous off-site storage. Mechanical systems maintain stable temperature and humidity to help preserve the collection, and the triangular floor plan gives nearly every room a different shape.

=== Qaumajuq ===
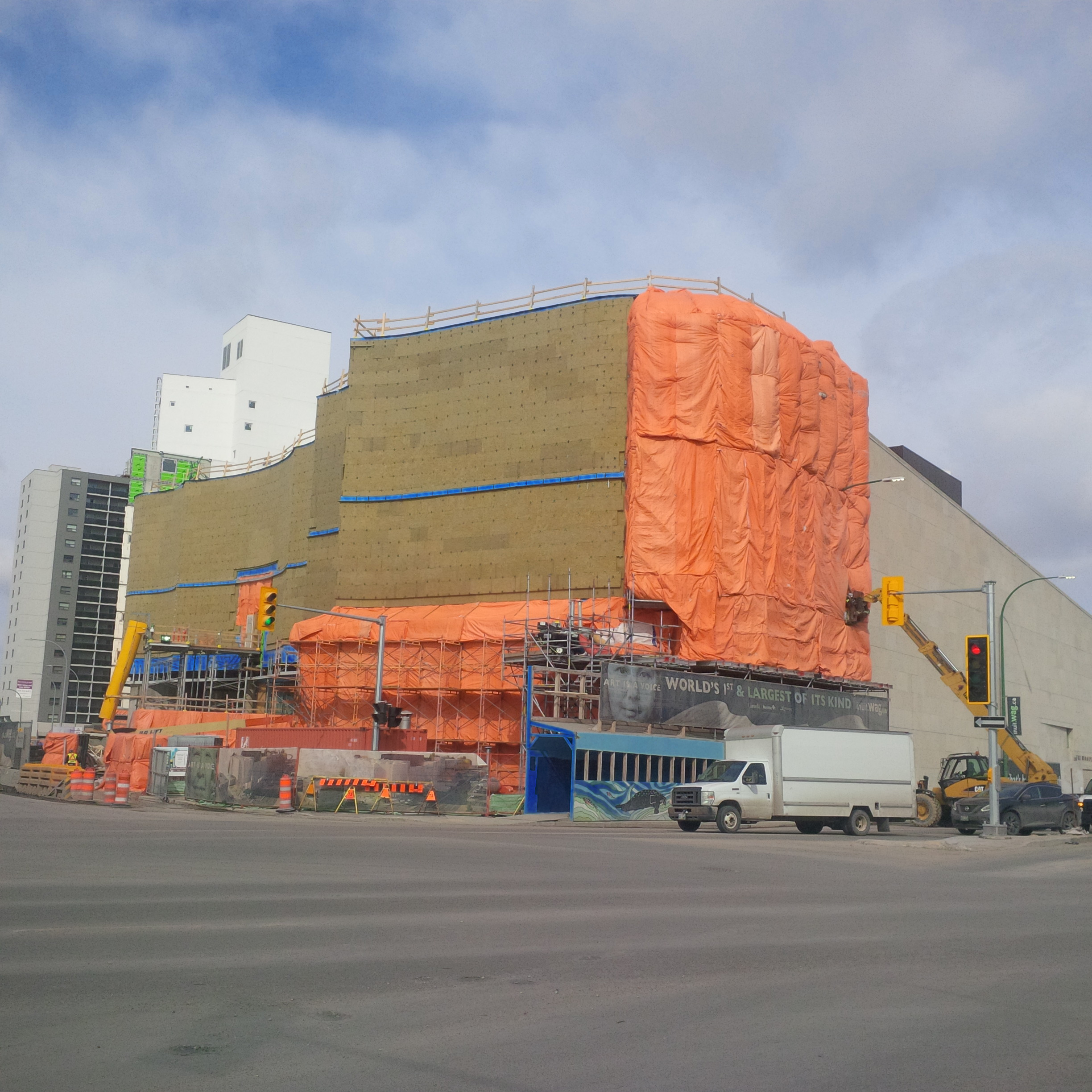
Qaumajuq under construction in April 2020

Qaumajuq is a four-storey 3,700-square-metre (40,000 sq ft) building situated immediately south of the museum's main building at the corner of Memorial Boulevard and St. Mary Avenue. Designed by Michael Maltzan of Michael Maltzan Architecture, the building complements the museum's 1971 main building while drawing inspiration from the landscapes, light, and openness of Northern Canada.

The exterior is clad in glass and off-white stone, with concrete and steel used as structural materials. Twenty-two recessed skylights, positioned approximately 9.1 metres (30 ft) above the floor, bring natural light into the building and cause it to glow "like a lantern" at night.

Curved forms are used throughout the interior to evoke the openness of Northern Canada. A 460-square-metre (5,000 sq ft) atrium contains a three-storey visible storage vault framed by a serpentine steel structure, allowing visitors to view works from the museum's Inuit art collection that are not on display. Adjacent to the atrium are a lecture room, café, and reading room.

The second floor contains a 90-seat theatre, a library, and a learning commons. The principal exhibition galleries occupy the third floor, providing approximately 790 square metres (8,500 sq ft) of exhibition space. The uppermost level contains five indoor and two outdoor art studios, while the roof level is designed to accommodate exhibitions and public performances.

== Permanent collection ==
As of March 2015, the Winnipeg Art Gallery's permanent collection includes over 24,000 works from Canadian and international artists. Approximately 70 percent of the permanent collection was gifted to the museum by private donors. Summer Afternoon, the Prairie by Lionel LeMoine FitzGerald was the first work purchased by the museum for its permanent collection.

The collection is organized into several collection areas, Canadian art, decorative arts, Inuit art, international art, photography, and works on paper. The photography collection was made a specialized area of its permanent collection during the 1980s. Its photography collection includes 1,400 works, most of which originated from Canadian artists in the latter half of the 20th century. The museum's works on paper collection contains approximately 6,000 items in its collection, encompassing historical to contemporary works by international artists, and Canadian artists, whose works make up the majority of the works on prints collection.

=== Canadian art ===
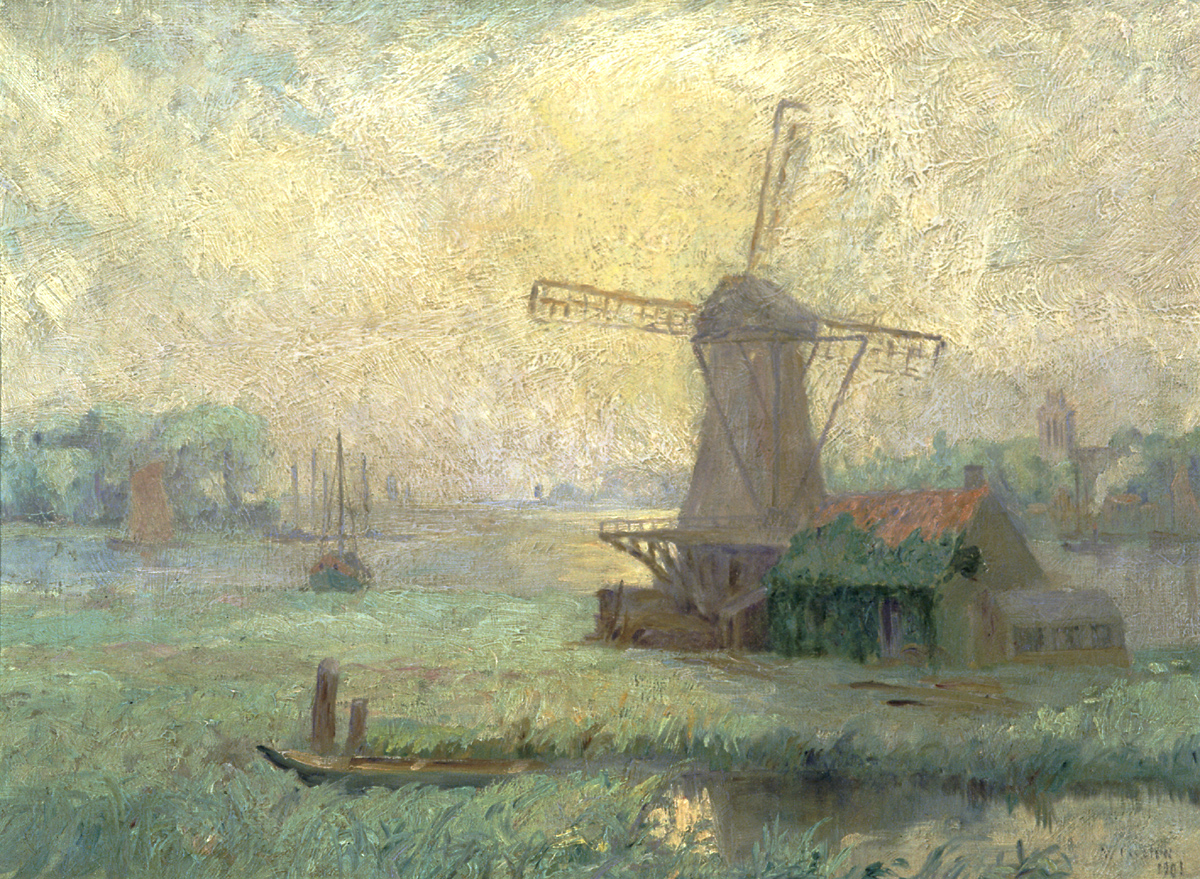
Wind Mill, Holland, by Maurice Cullen, 1901. The painting is held in the museum's collection of Canadian art.

The museum's Canadian collection includes works from Canadian artists dating back to the 1820s to the present day. The museum's permanent collection includes 200 works by Canadian artists from 1820 to 1910. Work by Canadian artists prior to the 20th century in the museum's collection include those created by Maurice Cullen, Mary Riter Hamilton, John A. Hammond, Robert Harris, Otto Reinhold Jacobi, Paul Kane, Cornelius Krieghoff, James Wilson Morrice, Lucius Richard O'Brien, William Raphael, George Agnew Reid, Peter Rindisbacher, Frederick Arthur Verner, and Homer Watson.

The collection also features a sizable collection of Canadian modern art (works produced from 1910 to 1979) including works by artists of the Winnipeg Gallery and School of Art, Painters Eleven, and the Regina Five. The museum's Canadian modern art collection also includes several works from the Group of Seven, including over 1,000 works from Group of Seven member Lionel LeMoine FitzGerald. Other works in the collection by modern Canadian artists include Bertram Brooker, Emily Carr, Charles Comfort, Ivan Eyre, Prudence Heward, William Kurelek, David Milne, Walter J. Phillips, Tony Tascona and William H. Lobchuk and other printmakers of the Grand Western Canadian Screen Shop.

The museum's also has a collection contemporary art from Canadian artists, most of which is made up equally of prints and paintings, although it also includes collages, drawings, installations, sculptures, and videos. The museum's collection of contemporary Canadian art includes works by Eleanor Bond, Aganetha Dyck, Cliff Eyland, Wanda Koop, Janet Werner, and the Royal Art Lodge.

=== Decorative art ===
As of March 2015, the museum's decorative art collection includes more than 4,000 works of ceramic, glass, metal, and textiles from the 17th century to the present. The decorative arts collection began in the 1950s when the museum was bequeathed a collection of decorative works from Melanie Bolton-Hill. The collection includes 1,500 ceramics from British artisans in the 18th and 19th centuries; nearly 1,000 Art Nouveau and Art Deco-styled glass objects from the late 19th century to the early 20th century; and 500 works of silver from British and Canadian silversmiths.

=== International art ===
The museum's international art collection is made up of paintings from American and European artists from the 19th and 20th centuries. The museum's international collection includes the Gort Collection, which features 19 panel paintings, and 5 tapestries from Northern Renaissance artists in the 15th and 16th centuries. The Gort Collection was bequeathed to the museum in 1973, although before that, it was already on long-term loan to the institution since 1954. The museum's international art collection also includes works by Alexander Archipenko, Eugène Boudin, Marc Chagall, Jean-Baptiste-Camille Corot, Raoul Dufy, Henri Fantin-Latour, Dan Flavin, Sol LeWitt, and Henry Moore.

=== Inuit art ===
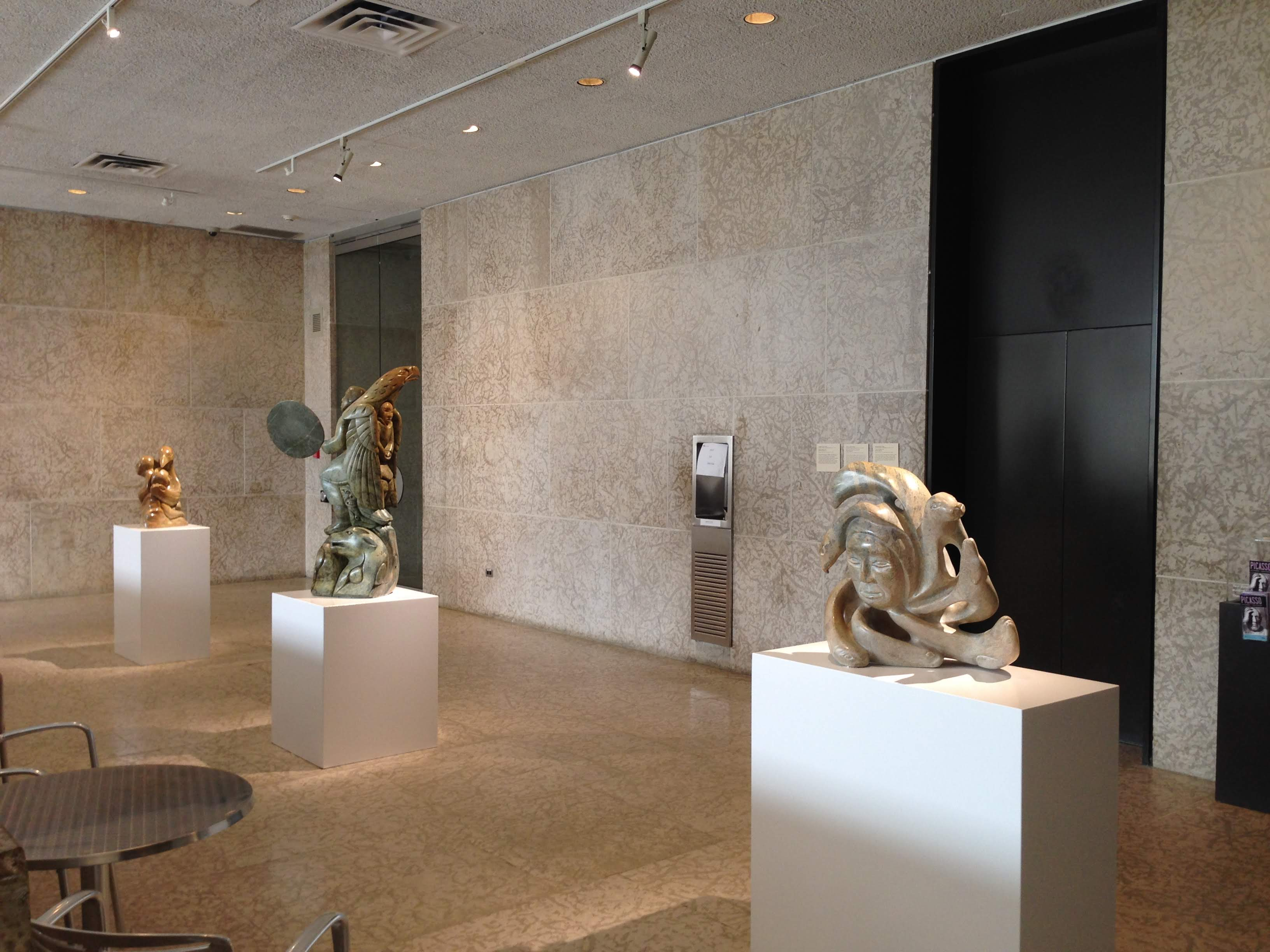
Inuit sculptures on exhibit in the museum's main building

The Winnipeg Art Gallery's permanent collection also includes the world's largest collection of Inuit art, numbering over 13,000 works in March 2019. Inuit carvings make up nearly two-thirds of the museum's Inuit collection, which includes 7,500 antler, bone, ivory, and stone carvings, dozens of hand-sewn wall hangings. Other works in the collection includes 3,000 prints and drawings from Inuit artists.

The first works for the museum's Inuit collection were acquired in the 1950s, although the museum's first substantial acquisition of Inuit works came in 1960, when George Swinton donated 130 sculptures to the museum. The collection was further bolstered in 1971, when the Jerry Twomey Collection, featuring 4,000 Inuit works, was donated to the museum. In 1989, Indian and Northern Affairs Canada (later renamed Indigenous and Northern Affairs Canada) donated 1,400 prints and drawings from Inuit artists to the museum.

Since 1972, the museum has appointed a full-time curator to oversee its collection of Inuit art. Most of the works from the museum's Inuit collection was stored in the basement storage space of its main building, although the museum planned to move these pieces to Qaumajuq's visible storage vault and exhibit. Qaumajuq was opened to the public in 2021.

Qaumajuq's inaugural exhibit was named INUA, meaning "life force" or "spirit" in some Arctic dialects. INUA is also an acronym for "Inuit Nunangat Ungammuaktut Atautikkut" (Inuit Moving Forward Together). The lead curator of the all-Inuit curatorial team designing the exhibit was Heather Igloliorte. Each of the four curators represented an area of the north. Igloliorte comes from Nunatsiavut, Krista Ulujuk Zawadski from Nunavut, Asinnajaq from Nunavik, and Kablusiak is Inuvialuit. A focus in creating the exhibit was to honour ancestors and families and to connect people living today to "that trajectory of who our ancestors are and who we will become ancestors for".

== Provenance and authentication ==
According to the Winnipeg Art Gallery, provenance research forms an ongoing part of the management of its permanent collection. In 2014, the gallery was one of six Canadian museums that participated in a pilot project coordinated by the Canadian Art Museum Directors Organization to research the ownership history of artworks that may have been displaced during the Nazi era. The gallery also makes provenance information about works in its collection available to the public upon request.

In 2018, the gallery helped resolve a nearly century-old art mystery when a painting in its permanent collection was identified as Peggy, a work by British artist Alfred Munnings that had disappeared from public view after its exhibition at the Royal Academy of Arts in London in 1919. The painting depicts the mare of Canadian Brigadier General Robert W. Paterson during the First World War. It was located after the National Army Museum appealed for assistance while reconstructing the 1919 exhibition, which had included 44 paintings by Munnings. A Canadian reader recognized the description of the missing work as a painting held by the Winnipeg Art Gallery. Paterson's children had donated Peggy to the gallery in 1984.

In 2024, the gallery confirmed that Astral Plain Scouts, a painting in its collection attributed to Norval Morrisseau, was a forgery connected to a large Canadian art-fraud investigation. A private collector had donated the work to the gallery in 2000, and it was last exhibited in 2013 before being placed in storage. The gallery had been alerted to concerns about the painting three years before the forgery was confirmed and subsequently shared information with police, researchers, and other museums. After investigators identified the work as fraudulent, it remained in the gallery's vault while the institution considered what to do with it.

== Library and archives ==
The museum also operates a library and archives, maintained by its curatorial department. Known as the Clara Lander Library, its holdings include books, and records that assists in the museum's educational mandate; whereas its archives contain administrative, curatorial, and educational documents relating to the museum. Access to the Clara Lander Library is free of charge, although a written request must be submitted to the museum to access its materials.

== Gallery shop and art rental ==
The Winnipeg Art Gallery has long operated a gallery shop and art rental program. The Associates of the Winnipeg Art Gallery, a volunteer organization founded in 1948 to support the museum through fundraising and public outreach, established and operated the Gallery Shop, created the Art Rental and Sales program, initially in partnership with the Junior League of Winnipeg, and helped establish the Clara Lander Library. The Art Rental and Sales program allowed individuals and businesses to rent original works of art.

When the Winnipeg Art Gallery moved into its purpose-built building in 1971, the Gallery Shop and a separate art rental shop were incorporated into the Main Hall alongside the museum's lobby, conservation laboratory, and auditorium. The Gallery Shop and Art Rental and Sales program continued to appear in the gallery's annual reports into the 2010s. By that decade, the shop featured books, exhibition catalogues, jewellery, original art, and contemporary craft, while also hosting trunk shows, exhibitions, and appearances by artists and makers.

The gallery expanded its retail operations beyond the museum in June 2016 with the opening of WAG@The Forks, a satellite shop in the Johnston Terminal at The Forks. Established in partnership with the Government of Nunavut and the Nunavut Development Corporation, the shop sold Inuit art alongside works by First Nations, Métis, Manitoba, and Canadian artists. The space also hosted artist demonstrations, workshops, and other public programming.

In 2020, the Gallery Shop was renovated and reopened as ShopWAG ahead of the opening of Qaumajuq the following year. The renovated shop sells books, jewellery, home décor, original artwork, and handcrafted works by Manitoba and Canadian artists.

== Selected works ==
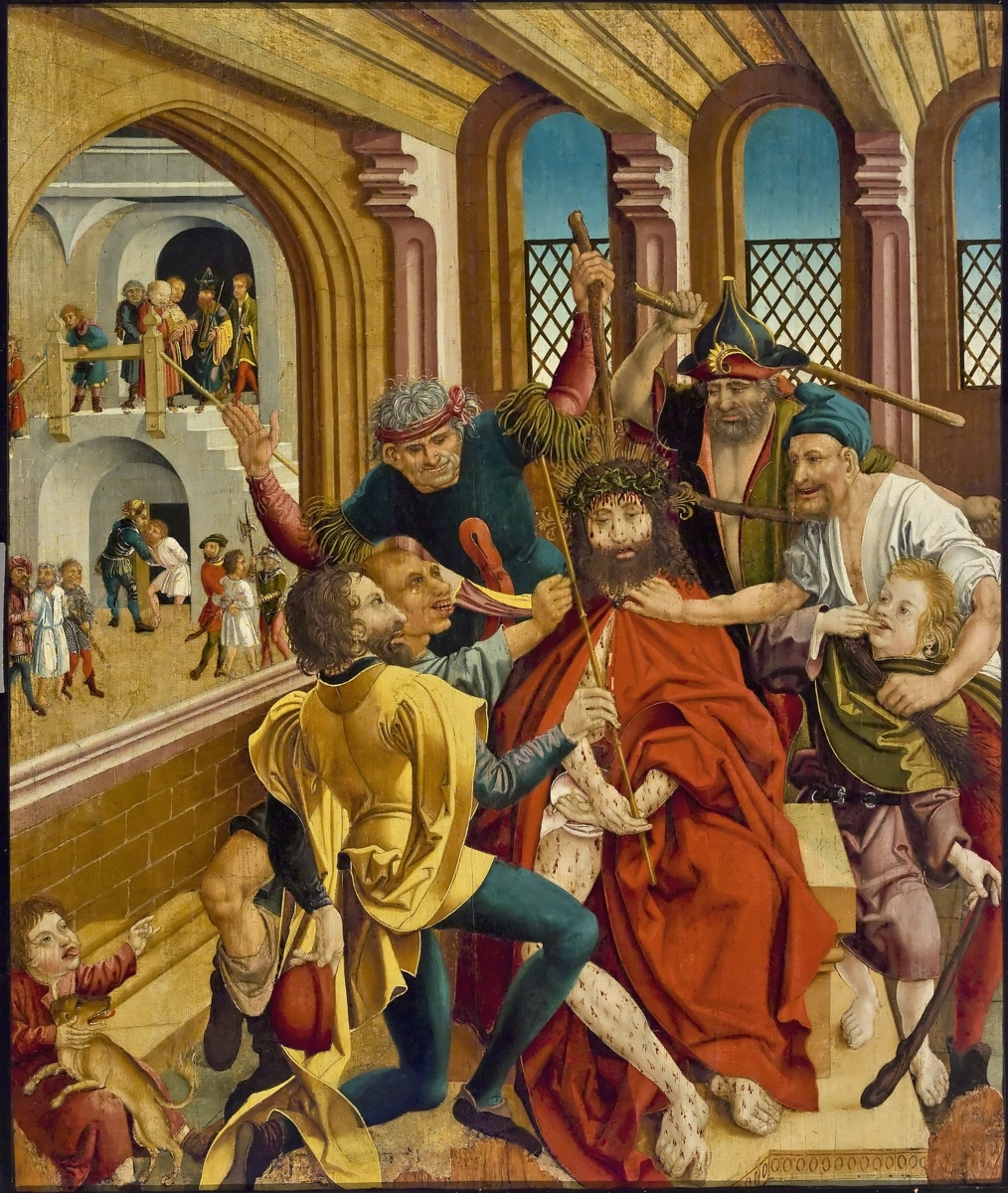
Wolfgang Katzheimer, The Mocking of Christ, c. 1500.

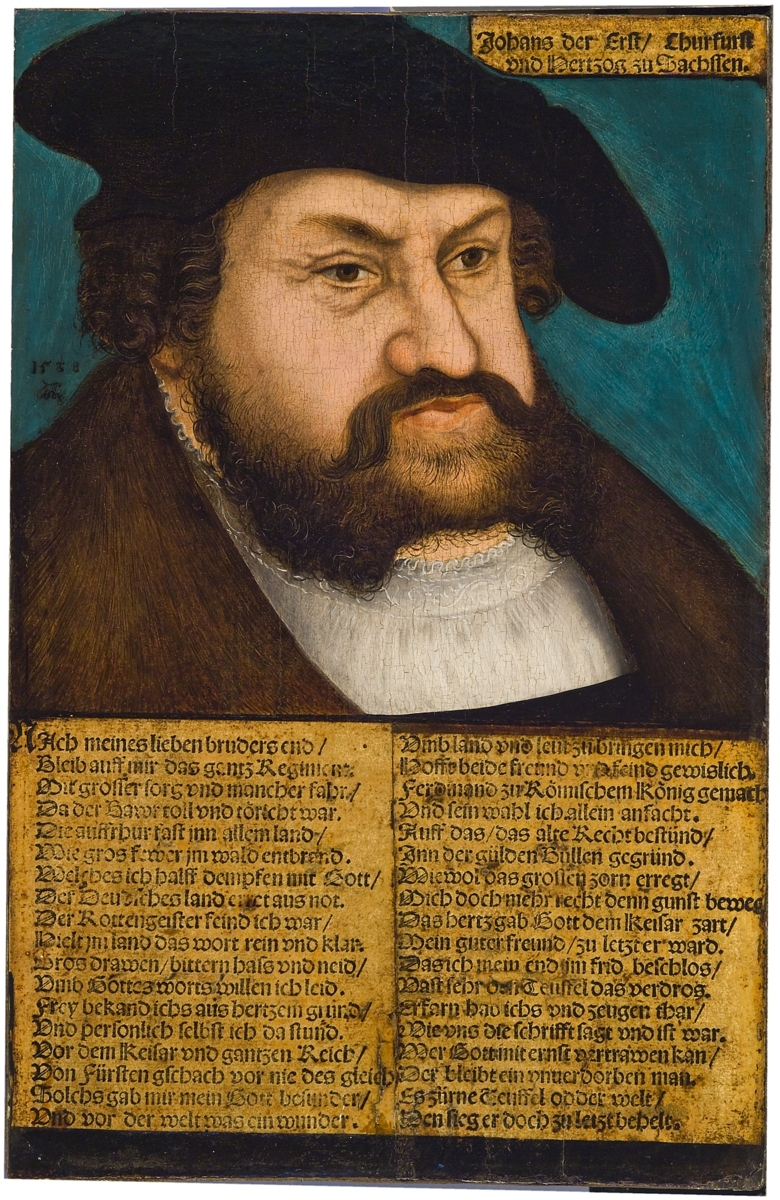
Lucas Cranach the Elder, Portrait of John I of Saxony, 1533.

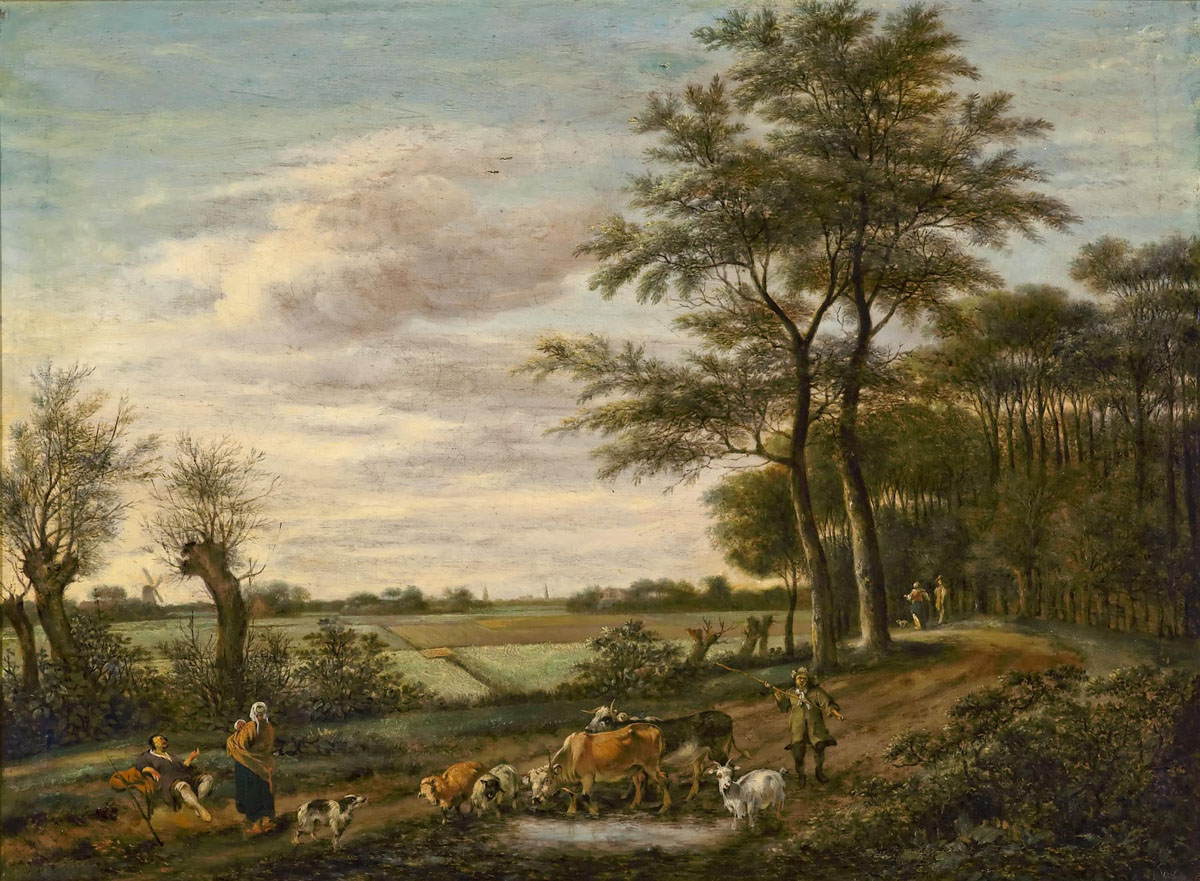
Pieter Jansz van Asch, Pastoral, c. 1640

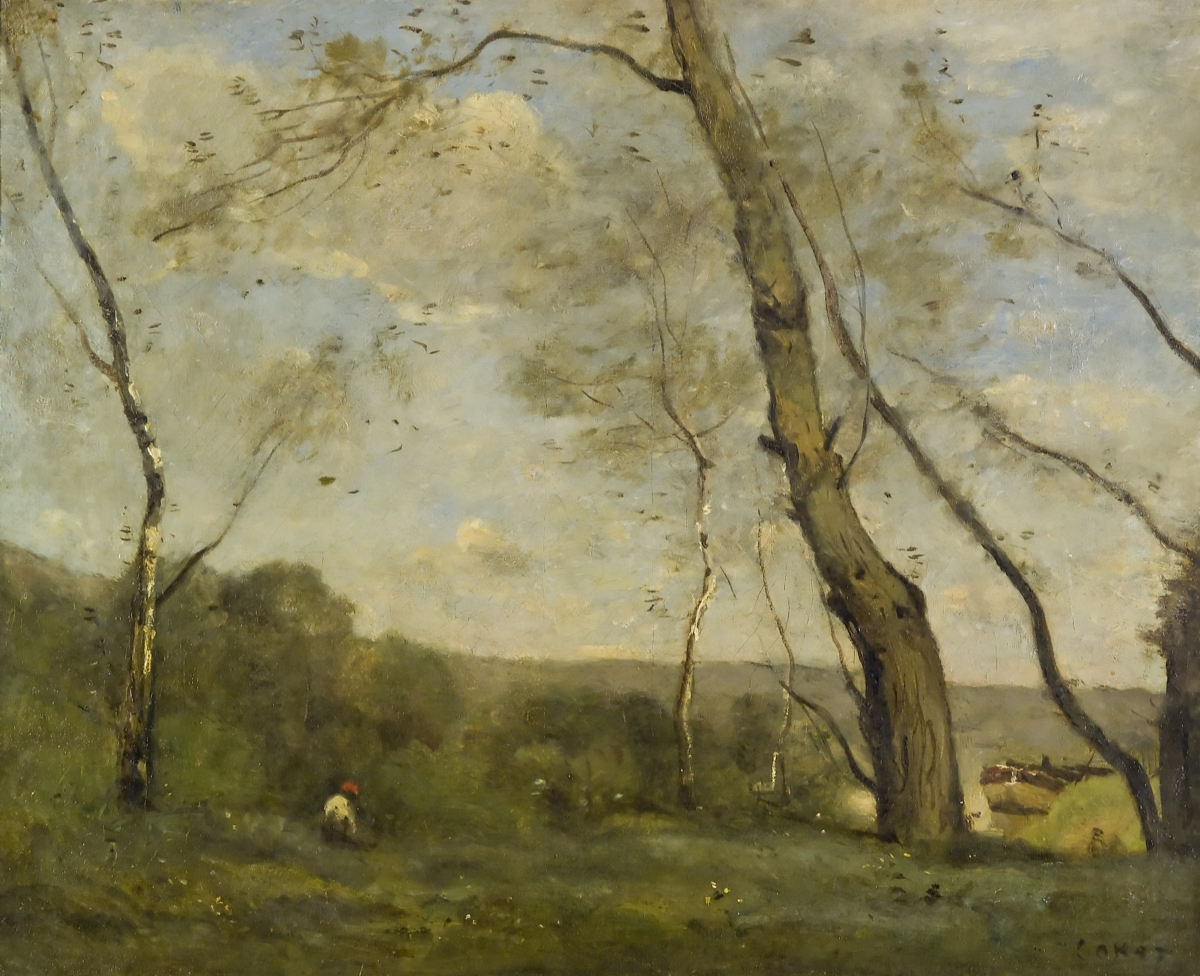
Jean-Baptiste-Camille Corot, Grands arbres dominant la berge d'une rivière, 1855.

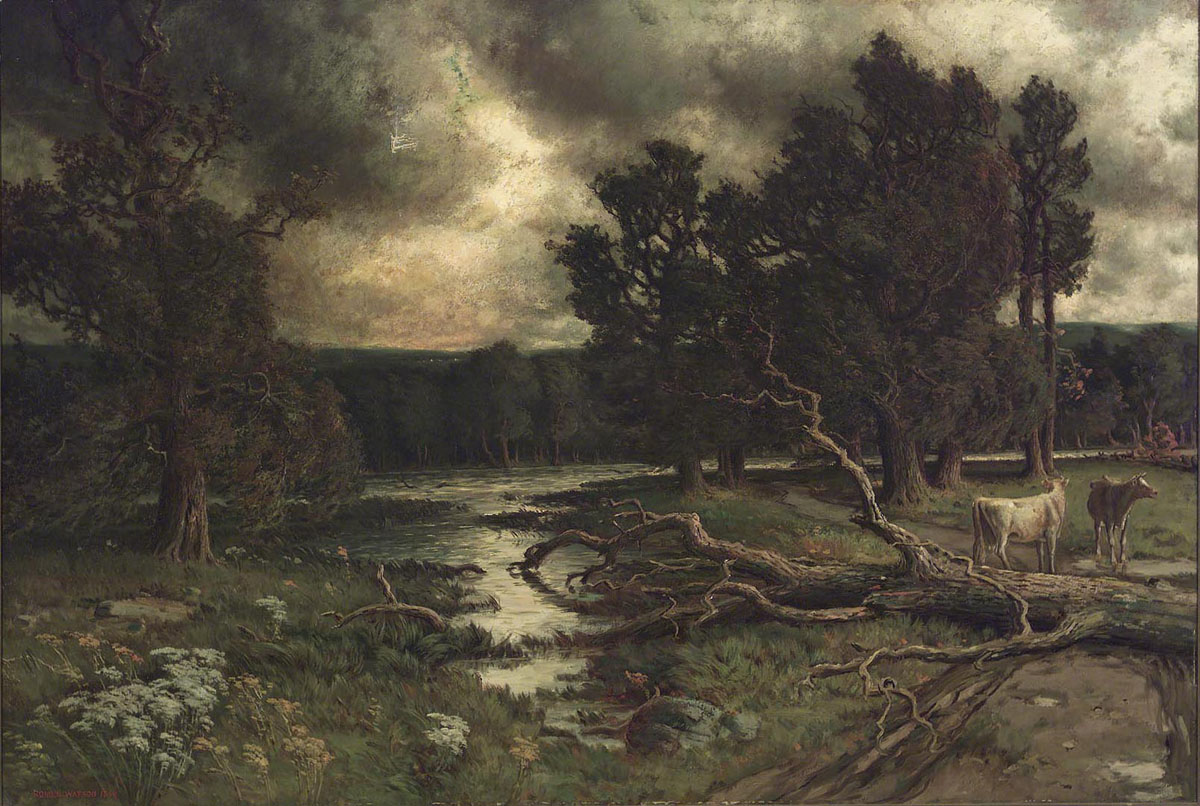
Homer Watson, Near the Close of a Stormy Day, 1884.

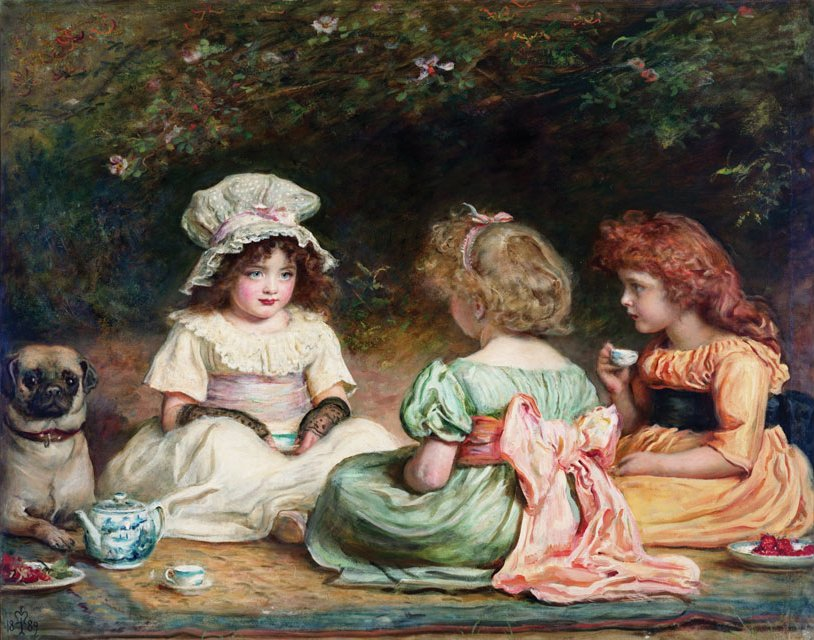
John Everett Millais, Afternoon Tea (The Gossips), 1889.

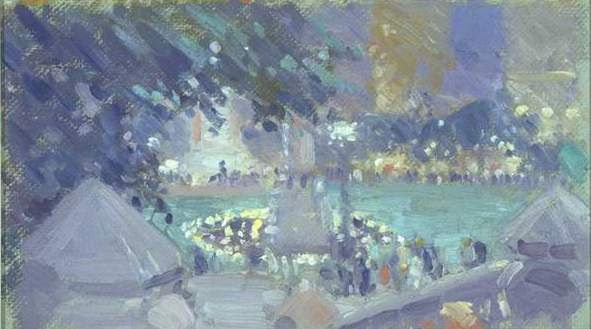
Maurice Cullen, Wharf Beaupré - L. Canada, 1898.

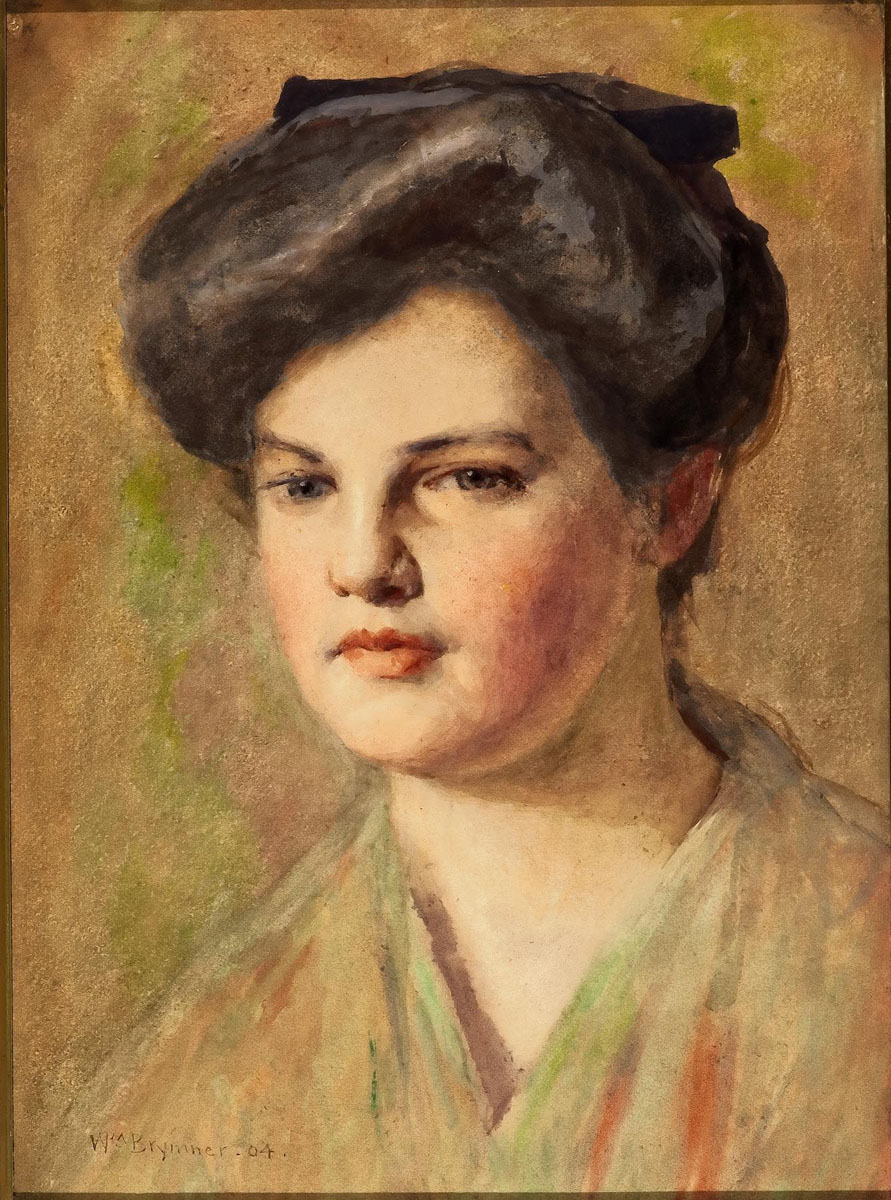
William Brymner, Portrait of a Young Girl, 1904.

== See also ==
- List of art museums
- List of museums in Manitoba
