= List of Canadian artists =

The following is a list of Canadian artists working in visual or plastic media (including 20th-century artists working in video art, performance art, or other types of new media). See other articles for information on Canadian literature, music, cinema and culture. For more specific information on the arts in Canada, see Canadian art.

== Individuals ==
=== A ===
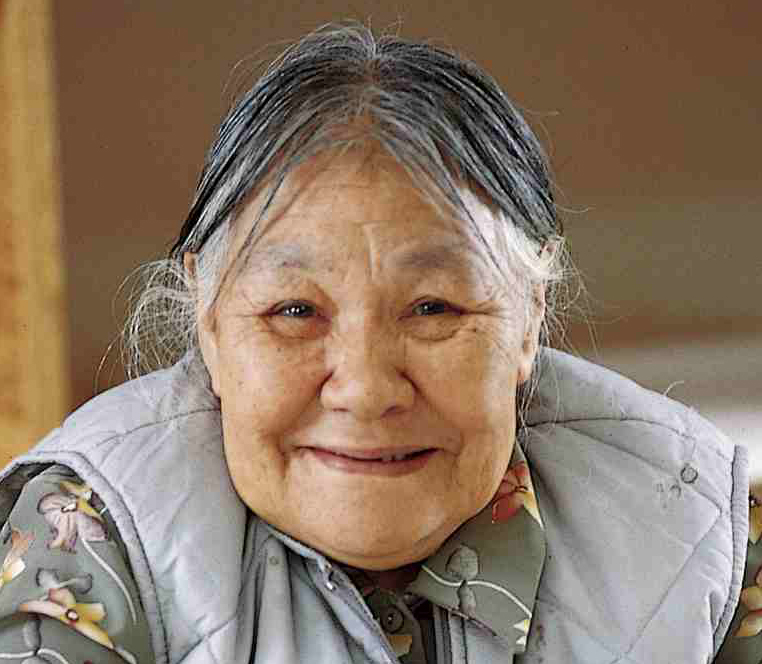
Kenojuak Ashevak

- Andréanne Abbondanza-Bergeron, installation art
- Kirsten Abrahamson (born 1960), ceramist
- Una Stella Abrahamson (1922–1999), artist, writer
- KC Adams (born 1971), multimedia artist
- Kim Adams (born 1951), sculptor
- Marilla Adams (1864–1966), painter
- Michael Adamson (born 1971), painter
- Catherine Addai, Ghanaian-Canadian fashion designer
- Marc Adornato (born 1977), painting, sculpting, performance and new media
- Latcholassie Akesuk (1919–2000), sculptor
- Manasie Akpaliapik (born 1955), sculptor
- Amelia Alcock-White (born 1981), painter
- Eric Aldwinckle (1909–1980), designer
- David T. Alexander (born 1947), painter
- Lady Eveline Marie Alexander (1821–1906), painter
- M.J. Alexander (born 1961), artist
- Vikky Alexander (born 1959), artist
- Wilhelmina Alexander (1871–1961), painter
- John Martin Alfsen (1902–1971), printmaker
- Ralph Allen (1926–2019), artist, painter and printmaker
- Edmund Alleyn (1931–2004), painter
- Jocelyne Alloucherie (born 1947), sculptor
- Helen Andersen (1919–1995), painter
- Lois Andison, installation artist
- Stephen Andrews (born 1956), artist
- Julie Andreyev (born 1962), multidisciplinary artist
- Evelyn Andrus (1909–1972), photographer
- Jaime Angelopoulos, sculptor
- Sara Angelucci (born 1962), photographer, video artist
- Marie-Elmina Anger (1844–1901), painter
- Kay Angliss (1923–2004), printmaker, watercolour and fibre artist
- Elizabeth Angrnaqquaq (1916–2003), textile artist
- Jennifer Angus (born 1961), installation artist
- Irene Kataq Angutitok (1914–1971), sculptor
- Margaret Uyauperq Aniksak (1907–1993), sculptor
- Parastoo Anoushahpour (born 1986), moving image artist
- Danielle April (born 1949), painter, printmaker
- Raymonde April (born 1953), photographer
- Isa Paddy Aqiattusuk (1898–1954), sculptor
- Joi Arcand (born 1982), photographer
- Louis Archambault (1915–2003), sculptor, ceramicist
- Robert Archambeau (1933–2022), ceramist
- Roy Arden (born 1957), sculptor
- Kate Armstrong, artist, writer, curator
- Shelagh Armstrong (born 1961), painter
- Germaine Arnaktauyok (born 1946), printmaker, painter
- Kenojuak Ashevak (1927–2003), artist and printmaker
- Myfanwy Ashmore (born 1970), new media artist
- Shuvinai Ashoona (born 1961), drawing
- Asinnajaq (born 1991), film & video artist
- Barbara Astman (born 1950), photography and new media
- William Edwin Atkinson (1862–1926), painter
- Melissa Auf der Maur (born 1972), photographer
- Ghazaleh Avarzamani (born 1980), artist

=== B ===
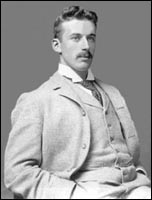
William Brymner

- Walter James Baber (1855–1924), painter
- Frédéric Back (1924–2013), painter, animator
- Lida Baday (born 1957), fashion designer
- Buseje Bailey, video, multimedia artist
- Unity Bainbridge (1916–2017), painter
- Anna P. Baker (1928–1985), painter
- Joan Balzar (1928–2016), painter
- Anna Banana (1940–2024), performance artist
- Marian Penner Bancroft (born 1947), photographer
- Casey Bannerman (born 1987), basketball artist
- Frances Bannerman (1855–1944), painter, poet
- Marian Bantjes (born 1963), graphic designer, artist, illustrator, typographer, writer
- Bruce Barber (born 1950), multimedia installation artist
- J. M. Barnsley (1861–1929), painter
- Annie Gardner Barr (1864–1921), artist
- Ed Bartram (1938–2019), printmaker, painter
- Earl W. Bascom (1906–1995), sculptor, painter, printmaker
- Robert Bateman (born 1930), painter, naturalist
- Patricia Martin Bates (born 1927), printmaker
- Jay Battle (born 1966), sculptor
- Lorna Bauer (born 1980), multi-media artist
- Fanny Wright Bayfield (1813/14–1891), botanical illustrator
- Nicole Bazuin, photographer and filmmaker
- Helen D. Beals (1897–1991), painter
- Anong Beam, Indigenous painter
- Carl Beam (1943–2005), painter, printmaker
- Jackson Beardy (1944–1984), painter
- Kate Beaton (born 1983), comics artist
- J. W. Beatty (1869–1941), painter
- Henri Beau (1863–1949), painter
- Micheline Beauchemin (1929–2009), textile artist
- Claire Beaulieu (born 1955), multi-media artist
- Marie-Hélène Beaulieu (born 1979), glass artist
- Betty Beaumont (born 1946), environmental artist
- Tammy Beauvais, Indigenous fashion designer
- Sarah Beck, sculptor
- Charles Beil (1894–1976), sculptor
- Sylvie Bélanger (1951–2020), installation artist
- Christi Belcourt (born 1966), painter
- Léon Bellefleur (1910–2007), painter
- Rebecca Belmore (born 1960), performance artist, installation artist
- Louis Belzile (1929–2019), painter
- Lorraine Bénic (born 1937), painter, sculptor
- Tom Benner (1950–2022), sculptor, installation artist
- Douglas Bentham (born 1947), sculptor
- William Berczy (1744–1813), painter
- Cecilia Berkovic, mixed-media artist
- Rachel Berman (1946–2014), painter, illustrator
- Judith Berry (born 1961), painter
- George Théodore Berthon (1806–1892), painter
- Derek Michael Besant (born 1950), printmaker, painter
- Edith Hallett Bethune (1890–1970), photographer
- Nia Faith Betty (born 2001), fashion designer
- Scott Beveridge (born 1964), video artist
- Aggie Beynon, metalsmith
- David Bierk (1944–2002), painter
- Olive Biller (1879–1957), painter, illustrator
- B. C. Binning (1909–1976), painter
- Yulia Biriukova (1897–1972), painter
- Mary E. Black (1895–1988), textile artist, writer
- Persimmon Blackbridge (born 1951), multi-disciplinary performance artist
- David Blackwood (1941–2022), printmaker
- Valérie Blass (born 1967), sculptor
- David Blatherwick (born 1960), painter, video artist
- Susanna Blunt (born 1955), painter
- Molly Lamb Bobak (1920–2014), painter, printmaker
- Catherine Bolduc (born 1970), drawing, sculpture, installation, public art
- David Bolduc (1945–2010), painter
- Eleanor Bond (born 1948), multi-media artist, art educator
- Marion Bond (1922–1965), painter
- Theodosia Bond (1915–2009), photography
- Jordi Bonet (1932–1979), sculptor, muralist
- Paul-Émile Borduas (1905–1960), painter
- Sam Borenstein (1908–1969), painter
- Mary Borgstrom (1916–2019), ceramic artist
- Diane Borsato (born 1973), multi-disciplinary artist
- Simone Mary Bouchard (1912–1945), painter, textile artist
- Céline Boucher (born 1945), painter, sculptor
- Diana Boulay (born 1946), sculptor
- Robert Bourdeau (born 1931), photographer
- Marie-Claude Bouthillier (born 1960), artist
- Deanna Bowen (born 1969), multi-disciplinary artist
- Fiona Bowie, multi-disciplinary artist
- John Boxtel (1930–2022), sculpture, woodcarving
- John Boyle (born 1941), painter
- Shary Boyle (born 1972), sculpture, painting, drawing, performance
- Barry Bradfield (born 1981), cartoonist
- Sheree Bradford-Lea, cartoonist
- Alexandra Bradshaw (1871–1938), painter
- Eva Theresa Bradshaw (1871–1938), painter
- Claude Breeze (born 1938), painter
- Roland Brener (1942–2006), sculptor
- Rita Briansky (1925–2025), painter and printmaker
- Sandra Bromley, sculptor
- AA Bronson (born 1946), mixed-media artist
- Reva Brooks (1913–2004), photographer
- Vera Brosgol (born 1984), cartoonist
- Lorna Brown (born 1958), artist, curator, writer
- J. Archibald Browne (1862–1948), painter
- William Brymner (1855–1925), painter
- Karin Bubaš (born 1976), painter, photographer
- David Buchan (1950–1994), performance artist, designer
- Annemarie Buchmann-Gerber (1947–2015), textile artist
- Krista Buecking (born 1982), sculptor, installation artist
- Tishynah Buffalo, Indigenous fashion designer
- Cecil Tremayne Buller (1886–1973), printmaker
- Angela Bulloch (born 1966), installation, audio artist
- Nina Bunjevac (born 1973), cartoonist
- Martin Bureau, multimedia artist
- Della Burford (born 1946), painter, writer
- Kay Burns, performance & interdisciplinary artist
- Cathy Bursey-Sabourin (born 1957), designer
- Dennis Burton (1933–2013), painter
- Ralph Wallace Burton (1905–1983), painter
- Edward Burtynsky (born 1955), photographer
- Cathy Busby (born 1958), print artist
- Jack Bush (1909–1977), painter
- Sheila Butler (born 1938), painter
- Jane Buyers (born 1948), sculptor

=== C ===
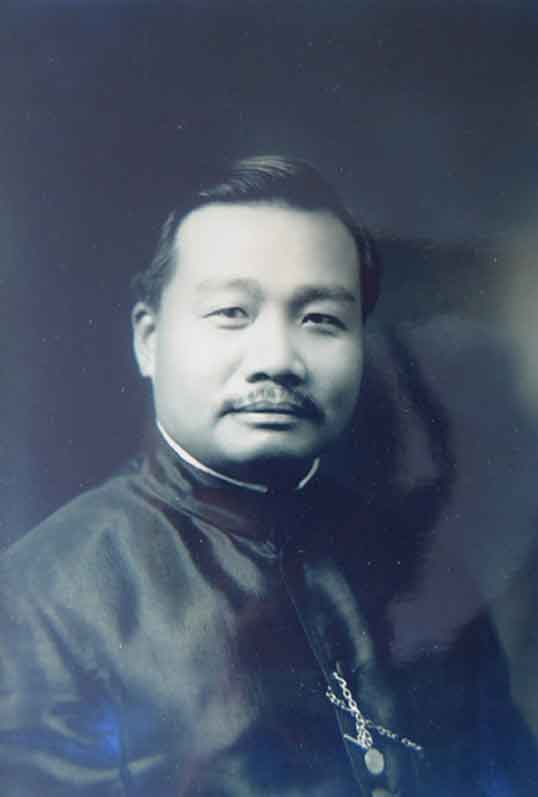
Yucho Chow

- Geneviève Cadieux (born 1955), photographer
- Sveva Caetani (1917–1994), painter
- Ghitta Caiserman-Roth (1923–2005), painter, printmaker
- Dorothy Caldwell (born 1948), fibre artist
- Elaine Cameron-Weir (born 1985), visual artist
- Dale Campbell (born 1954), sculptor
- Valerie Campbell-Harding (1932–2006), textile artist
- Nicole Camphaug, Inuk fashion designer
- Janet Cardiff (born 1957), installation artist
- Lance Cardinal, Cree artist and children's art educator
- James Carl (born 1960), sculptor
- Florence Carlyle (1864–1923), painter
- Franklin Carmichael (1890–1945), painter
- J. R. Carpenter (born 1972), hypermedia artist, writer
- Emily Carr (1871–1945), painter
- Ian Carr-Harris (born 1941), installation artist
- Heather Carroll (born 1956), multi-disciplinary artist
- Barbara Caruso (1937–2009), painter
- Geneviève Castrée (1981–2016), comic artist, illustrator
- Gino Cavicchioli (born 1957), sculptor, artist
- Mabel Cawthra (1871–1943), painter
- Christiane Chabot (born 1950), artist
- Cynthia Chalk (1913–2018), nature photography
- Frederick Challener (1869–1959), muralist, painter, teacher
- Jack Chambers (1931–1978), artist and filmmaker
- Ruth Chambers (born 1960), installation artist
- Horace Champagne (born 1937), pastelist
- Millicent Mary Chaplin (1790–1858), painter
- Robert Chaplin (born 1968), artist, publisher
- Monique Charbonneau (1928–2014), painter
- Lyne Charlebois, photographer, director
- Judy Chartrand (born 1959), mixed media artist
- Benjamin Chee Chee (1944–1977), printmaker, painter
- Nan Lawson Cheney (1897–1985), painter and medical artist
- Svetlana Chmakova (born 1979), comic artist
- Olivia Chow (born 1957), sculptor, politician
- Raymond Chow (born 1941), painter
- Yucho Chow (1876–1949), photographer
- Delores Churchill (born 1929), Haida weaver
- June Clark (born 1941), photographer, sculptor
- Paraskeva Clark (1898–1986), painter
- Ann Clarke (born 1944), abstract painter
- Dana Claxton (born 1959), filmmaker, photographer, performance artist
- Alberta Cleland (1876–1960), painter
- F. S. Coburn (1871–1960), painter, illustrator, photographer
- Wendy Coburn (1963–2015), sculptor
- Daniel Cockburn (born 1976), filmmaker and performance artist
- Lynne Cohen (1944–2014), photographer
- Keith Cole, performance artist
- Martha Cole (born 1946), textile artist, writer
- Susan Collett (born 1961), printmaker, ceramist
- Katherine Collins (born 1947), cartoonist, writer, composer
- Nicole Collins, painter, performance artist, sound and video artist
- Petra Collins (born 1992), photographer, designer
- Nora Collyer (1898–1979), painter
- Stéphanie Colvey (born 1949), photographer
- Alex Colville (1920–2013), painter
- Stephanie Comilang (born 1980), artist and filmmaker
- Edith Grace Coombs (1890–1986), painter
- Emily Coonan (1885–1971), painter
- Christian Corbet (born 1966), painter, sculptor
- Corno (1952–2016), painter
- Sonia Cornwall (1919–2006), painter
- Stanley Cosgrove (1911–2002), painter, draughtsperson and muralist
- Bruno Cote (1940–2010), painter
- Graham Coughtry (1931–1999), painter
- Douglas Coupland (born 1961), sculptural installation
- Michèle Cournoyer (born 1943), animator
- E.B. Cox (1914–2003), sculptor
- Linda Craddock (born 1952), painter
- Kate Craig (1947–2002), video and performance artist
- Josephine Crease (1864–1947), painter
- Sarah Lindley Crease (1826–1922), painter, botanical illustrator
- Susan Reynolds Crease (1855–1947), painter and women's rights activist
- Marlene Creates (born 1952), artist
- William Nicoll Cresswell (1818–1888), painter
- Arthur Crisp (1881–1974), designer, illustrator, muralist
- Roewan Crowe, multi-disciplinary artist, activist, educator
- Jill Culiner (born 1945), photographer
- Maurice Cullen (1866–1934), painter
- Donigan Cumming (born 1947), multimedia artist
- Jane Catherine Cummins (1841–1893), painter
- Greg Curnoe (1936–1992), painter, musician
- Ruth Cuthand (born 1954), painter, printmaker
- George Cuthbertson (1898–1969), marine artist, researcher, author
- Randy Lee Cutler (born 1964), collage & performance artist, writer
- Colleen Cutschall (born 1951), Oglala-Sicangu Lakota multi-media artist
- Gertrude Spurr Cutts (1858–1941), painter
- Nina Czegledy, new media artist

=== D ===
- Karen Dahl (born 1955), ceramist
- Greta Dale (1929–1978), sculptor
- Frederick Dally (1838–1914), photographer
- Kathleen Daly (1898–1994), painter
- Ken Danby (1940–2007), painter
- Madeleine Dansereau (1922–1991), jeweller
- Sylvia Daoust (1902–2004), sculptor
- Ann Darbyshire (1926–2007), print-maker
- Charles Daudelin (1920–2001), sculptor, painter
- Karin Davie (born 1965), painter
- Char Davies (born 1954), multimedia artist
- Sally Davies (born 1956), painter, photographer
- Olea Marion Davis (1899–1977), ceramist, sculptor
- Raven Davis (born 1975), multimedia and mixed media artist
- Betty Davison (1909–2000), printmaker
- Paloma Dawkins, cartoonist, video game designer
- Dennis Day (born 1960), video artist
- Forshaw Day (1837–1901), landscape artist, printmaker
- Katherine Day (1889–1976), painter, printmaker
- Adriana de Barros (born 1976), illustrator, web designer, poet
- Cozette de Charmoy (born 1939), multidisciplinary artist
- Nicholas Raphael de Grandmaison (1892–1978), painter
- Louis de Niverville (1933–2019), painter
- Xiomara De Oliver (born 1967), painter
- Dora de Pedery-Hunt (1913–2008), sculptor
- Eric Deis (born 1979), photographer
- Roseline Delisle (1952–2003), ceramist
- Jen Delos Reyes, artist
- Angela DeMontigny, Indigenous fashion designer
- Shawna Dempsey and Lorri Millan, performance artists
- Simone Dénéchaud (1905–1974), painter
- Kady MacDonald Denton (born 1941), painter
- René Derouin (born 1936), printmaker
- Berthe des Clayes (1877–1968), painter
- Gertrude des Clayes (1879–1949), painter
- Bonnie Devine (born 1952), Ojibway installation artist, performance artist, and sculptor
- Walter Dexter (1931–2015), ceramist
- Sarindar Dhaliwal (born 1953), multimedia artist
- Freda Diesing (1925–2002), Haida carver
- Mary Dignam (1857–1938), painter
- Jess Dobkin (born 1970), performance artist
- Susan Dobson (born 1965), photographer, installation artist
- Katherine Dodds, artist, writer, filmmaker
- Melissa Doherty (born 1967), painter
- Yuri Dojc (born 1946), photographer
- Eva Brook Donly (1867–1941), painter
- Lynn Donoghue (1953–2003), painter
- Audrey Capel Doray (1931–2025), multidisciplinary artist
- Julie Doucet (1867–1941), painter
- Stan Douglas (born 1960), installation artist
- Marie-Denise Douyon (born 1961), painter, illustrator
- Ann MacIntosh Duff (1925–2022), painter
- Walter R. Duff (1879–1967), painter, designer
- Tarralik Duffy (born 1979), Inuk multimedia artist
- Caroline Dukes (1929–2003), painter, installation artist
- Aleksandra Dulic (born 1973), installation & performance artist
- Delree Dumont, painter
- Albert Dumouchel (1916–1971), printmaker, painter, teacher
- Alma Duncan (1917–2004), painter, filmmaker
- Carol Dunlop (1946–1982), photographer, writer
- Kyle Bobby Dunn (born 1986), sound artist, composer, painter
- Chantal duPont (1942–2019), multidisciplinary artist
- Aganetha Dyck (1937–2025), sculptor, installation artist
- Edmond Dyonnet (1859–1954), painter, teacher
- Marcel Dzama (born 1974), artist

=== E ===
- Susan Edgerley (born 1960), glass artist
- Arthur Elliot (1809–1892), watercolourist
- Emily Louise Orr Elliott (1867–1952), oil painter and fashion designer
- Harold Elliott (1890–1968), painter
- Ennutsiak (1896–1967), sculptor
- Arthur John Ensor (1905–1995), painter
- Lucassie Etungat (1951–c. 2016), sculptor
- Evergon (born 1946), photographer and photo-collage
- Paterson Ewen (1925–2002), painter
- Ivan Eyre (1935–2022), painter, sculptor
- Janieta Eyre (born 1971), photographer

=== F ===
- Barker Fairley (1887–1986), painter, writer
- Gathie Falk (1928-2025), painter, ceramic sculptor, installation artist, performance artist
- Lilias Farley (1907–1989), painter
- Geoffrey Farmer (born 1967), installation artist
- Caroline Farncomb (1859–1951), painter
- André Fauteux (born 1946), sculptor
- Marcelle Ferron (1924–2001), painter, glazier
- George Fertig (1915–1983), painter
- Dorian FitzGerald (born 1975), painter
- Deanne Fitzpatrick, rug-hooking artist
- Peter Flinsch (1920–2010), painter, sculptor, television set designer
- Lita Fontaine, Indigenous mixed media artist
- Dulcie Foo Fat (born 1946), painter
- Marc-Aurèle Fortin (1888–1970), painter
- Margaret Frame (1903–1985), painter
- Statira Elizabeth Frame (1870–1935), painter
- Leonard Frank (1870–1944), photographer

=== G ===
- Louise Landry Gadbois (1896–1985), painter
- Robert Ford Gagen (1847–1926), painter
- Charles Gagnon (1934–2003), multidisciplinary artist
- Yechel Gagnon (born 1973), mixed media artist
- Marianna Gartner (born 1963), painter
- Jean Gaudreau (born 1964), artist, painter, and engraver
- Pierre Gauvreau (1922–2011), painter, writer
- Wyn Geleynse (born 1947), film and video
- Robert Genn (1936–2014), painter
- Carlo Gentile (1835–1893), photographer
- Douglas Patrick George (1943–2025), visual artist
- Will Gill (born 1968), sculptor, painter, photographer and video artist
- Violet Gillett (1898–1996), painter
- Joseph Giunta (1911–2001), painter, collage/assemblage artist
- Gerald Gladstone (1929–2005), sculptor, painter
- Henry George Glyde (1906–1998), painter, draftsperson, art educator
- Elaine Goble (born 1956), visual artist
- John Godfrey (1951–2022), painter
- Ted Godwin (1933–2013), painter, member of the Regina Five
- Eric Goldberg (1890–1969), painter
- Dina Goldstein (born 1969), visual artist
- Noam Gonick (born 1973), filmmaker
- Rob Gonsalves (1959–2017), painter
- Betty Goodwin (1923–2008), printmaker, sculptor, painter
- Paul Goranson (1911–2002), painter
- Hortense Gordon (1886–1961), painter
- Richard Gorman (1935–2010), painter, printmaker
- K.M. Graham (1913–2008), painter
- Rodney Graham (1949–2022), photographer, installation artist
- Pierre Granche (1948–1997), sculptor
- John Greer (born 1944), sculptor
- Jude Griebel (born 1978), sculptor
- Edmund Wyly Grier (1862–1957), painter
- Maggie Groat, Indigenous multi-disciplinary artist
- Angela Grossmann (born 1955), painter
- Aline Gubbay (1920–2005), photographer, art historian
- Suzanne Guité (1927–1981), sculptor, painter

=== H ===
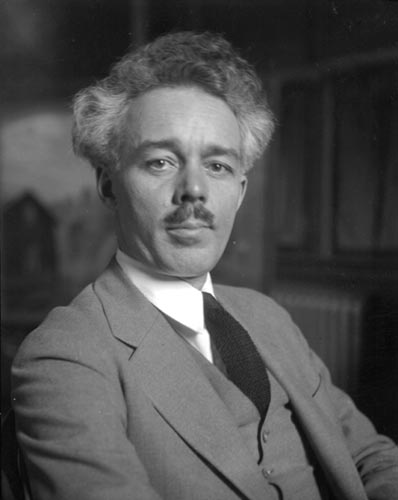
Lawren Harris

- Samra Habib, photographer
- Alexandra Haeseker (born 1945), painter, printmaker, installation artist
- Fred Hagan (1918–2003), lithographer, painter, art instructor
- John Hall (born 1943), painter
- Bess Larkin Housser Harris (1890–1969), painter
- Lawren Harris (1885–1970), painter
- Paul Hartal (born 1936), painter, poet
- John Hartman (born 1950), painter
- Jamelie Hassan (born 1948), multi-disciplinary artist
- Douglas Haynes (1936–2016), painter
- Fred Herzog (1930–2019), photographer
- Colleen Heslin (born 1976), painter
- Carle Hessay (1911–1978), painter
- J. C. Heywood (1941–2022), printmaker
- Barbara Roe Hicklin (1918–2010), painter
- Gilah Yelin Hirsch (born 1944), multi-disciplinary artist
- William G. Hobbs (1927–2012), painter, historian
- Elizabeth Bradford Holbrook (1913–2009), sculptor
- Edwin Holgate (1892–1977), painter
- Elsie Holloway (1882–1971), photographer
- Robert Holmes (1861–1930), naturalist painter
- Thaddeus Holownia (born 1949), photographer
- Margaret Lindsay Holton (born 1955), painter, pinhole photographer, writer
- Elisabeth Margaret Hopkins (1894–1991), painter
- Frances Anne Hopkins (1838–1919), painter
- Robin Hopper (1939–2017), ceramist
- Cleeve Horne (1912–1998), painter, sculptor
- Nesta Bowen Horne (1896-1987), painter
- Robert Houle (born 1947), First Nations artist
- Yvonne McKague Housser (1897–1996), painter, teacher
- Barbara Howard (1926–2002), painter, wood engraver
- Simone Hudon-Beaulac (1905–1984), painter, printmaker
- Lynn Hughes, painter and digital artist
- Barb Hunt, textile artist
- Natalka Husar (born 1951), painter

=== I ===
- Daniel Innes, painter, graphic designer, installation artist and illustrator
- Charlie Inukpuk (born 1941), sculptor
- Johnny Inukpuk (1911–2007), sculptor
- Osuitok Ipeelee (1922–2005), sculptor
- Jay Isaac (born 1975), painter
- Gershon Iskowitz (1921–1988), painter

=== J ===
- A. Y. Jackson (1882–1974), painter
- Sybil Henley Jacobson (1881–1953), British-born Canadian painter
- Louis Jaque (1919–2010), Quebec modernist
- Donald Jarvis (1923–2001), painter
- Charles William Jefferys (1869–1951), painter, illustrator, muralist, author
- Mendelson Joe (1944–2023), painter, musician
- Frank Johnston (1888–1949), painter, member of Group of Seven
- John Young Johnstone (1887–1930), Impressionist painter
- G.B. Jones (born 1965), illustrator, visual artist, experimental filmmaker
- Anique Jordan (born 1987), multi-disciplinary artist
- Leonel Jules (born 1953), painter
- Brian Jungen (born 1970), sculptor, installation artist

=== K ===
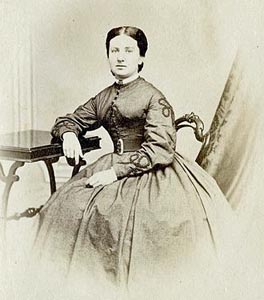
Alicia Killaly

- Dusan Kadlec (1942–2018), painter
- Anne Kahane (1924–2023), sculptor
- Paul Kane (1810–1871), painter
- Yousuf Karsh (1908–2002), photographer
- Herzl Kashetsky (born 1950), painter
- Ali Kazimi (born 1961), filmmaker, media artist
- Shelagh Keeley (born 1954), visual artist
- Augustus Kenderdine (1870–1947), landscape and portrait artist
- Garry Neill Kennedy (1935–2021), conceptual artist and educator
- Marie Khouri, sculptor
- Kiakshuk (1886–1966), sculptor and printmaker
- Alicia Killaly (1836–1908), painter
- Holly King (born 1957), photographer
- Winnifred Kingsford (1880–1947), sculptor
- Ada Florence Kinton (1859–1905), artist
- Ann Kipling (1934–2023), artist
- Roy Kenzie Kiyooka (1926–1994), painting, performance, multi-media
- Harold Klunder (born 1943), abstract painter
- Dorothy Knowles (1927–2023), painter
- Deborah Koenker (born 1949), interdisciplinary artist
- John Koerner (1913–2014), painter
- Germaine Koh (born 1967), conceptual artist
- Valérie Kolakis (born 1966), sculpture, installation
- Wanda Koop (born 1951), painter
- Elaine Kowalsky (1948–2005), printmaker
- Cornelius Krieghoff (1815–1872), painter
- Donna Kriekle (born 1945), artist
- Madeleine Isserkut Kringayak (1928–1984), Inuk sculptor
- Nobuo Kubota (1932–2025), multimedia
- Thomassie Kudluk (1910–1989), Inuk sculptor and drafts person
- Myra Kukiiyaut (1929–2006), Inuk artist
- Maya Kulenovic (born 1975), painter
- Anita Kunz (born 1956), artist, illustrator
- William Kurelek (1927–1977), painter

=== L ===
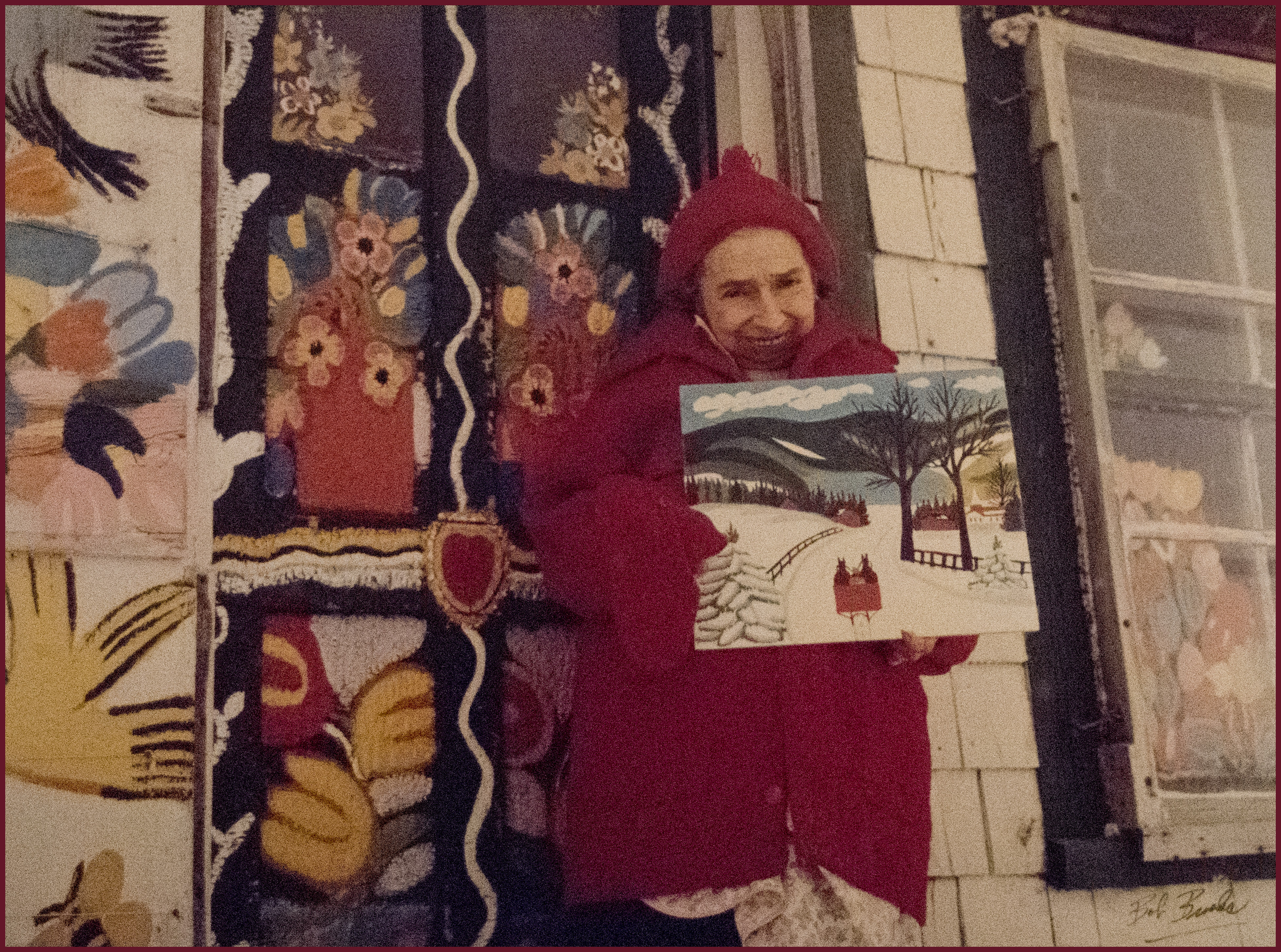
Maud Lewis

- Françoise Labbé (1933–2001), painter
- Sophie Labelle, cartoonist, writer
- Stephen Lack (born 1946), actor, painter
- Martha Ladly, designer, musician
- Laiwan (born 1961), artist
- Suzy Lake (born 1961), installation, performance artist
- Sylvie Laliberté (born 1959), performance artist, video artist, musician
- Michel Lambeth (1923–1977), photographer
- Gisèle Lamoureux (1942–2018), photographer
- Artis Lane (born 1927), painter
- Cal Lane (born 1968), sculptor
- Dawn Langstroth (born 1979), painter, singer, songwriter
- Anne Langton (1804–1893), painter
- J. Fenwick Lansdowne (1937–2008), wildlife artist
- Yvette Lapointe (1912–1994), comics
- Christine Laptuta (born 1951), photographer
- Jules Lasalle (born 1957), sculptor
- Marie-Thérèse Lasselle (1735–1819), painter
- Dinah Lauterman (1899–1945), sculptor, musician
- Michelle LaVallee (born 1977), artist, curator
- Marguerite Vincent Lawinonkié (1783–1865), Huron-Wendat craftivist
- Caroline Leaf (born 1946), filmmaker, animator
- Jo Lechay, painter, dancer, choreographer
- Ozias Leduc (1864–1955), painter
- Edeline Lee, fashion designer
- Sky Lee (born 1952), artist, writer
- Gary Lee-Nova (born 1943), painter, printmaker, sculptor, filmmaker
- Elizabeth Lefort (1914–2005), tapestry artist
- Jennifer Lefort (born 1976), painter
- Joseph Légaré (1795–1855), painter
- Irène Legendre (1904–1992), painter
- Enid Legros-Wise (born 1943), ceramist
- Jean Paul Lemieux (1904–1990), painter
- Michel Lemieux (born 1959), multimedia artist (film, video, performance)
- Serge Lemoyne (1941–1998), painter
- Beatrice Lennie (1905–1987), sculptor
- Rita Letendre (1928–2021), abstract painter
- Laura L. Letinsky (born 1962), photographer
- Marilyn Levine (1935–2005), artist
- Mark Lewis (born 1958), installation and film artist
- Maud Lewis (1903–1970), painter
- Tau Lewis (born 1993), artist
- Robert Henry Lindsay (1868–1938), painter
- Robert Linsley (1952–2017), painter and writer
- Oleg Lipchenko (born 1957), artist and illustrator
- Arthur Lismer (1885–1969), painter
- Glen Loates (born 1945), painter and coin designer
- Mabel Lockerby (1882–1976), painter
- Judith Lodge (born 1941), painter and photographer
- Karen Lofgren (born 1976), painter
- Joy Zemel Long (1922–2018), painter
- Marion Long (1882–1970), painter
- Victor Albert Long (1866–1938), portrait painter
- Mary Longman (born 1964), artist
- Frances Loring (1887–1968), sculptor
- Michèle Lorrain (born 1960), painter, installation artist
- Irene Loughlin (born 1967), artist
- Frederick Loveroff (1894–1959), painter
- Rafael Lozano-Hemmer (born 1967), installation artist
- Helen Lucas (born 1967), painter, writer
- Attila Richard Lukacs (born 1962), painter
- Alexandra Luke (1901–1967), painter
- James Lumbers (born 1929), painter
- Linda Lundström (born 1951), fashion designer
- Almuth Lütkenhaus (1930–1996), sculptor
- Irene Luxbacher (born 1970), artist, writer
- Laura Muntz Lyall (1860–1930), painter

=== M ===
- Toshiko MacAdam (born 1940), fibre artist
- J.E.H. MacDonald (1873–1932), painter, member of the Group of Seven
- Jock Macdonald (1897–1960), member of Painters Eleven
- Thoreau MacDonald (1901–1989), illustrator, graphic and book designer, artist
- John MacGregor (1942–2019), painter, printmaker, sculptor
- Landon Mackenzie (born 1954), painter
- Sarah Jean Munro Maclean (1873–1952), painter
- Myfanwy Macleod (born 1961), artist
- Pegi Nicol MacLeod (1904–1949), painter
- Margaret Campbell Macpherson (1860–1931), painter
- Lani Maestro (born 1957), installation artist
- Arnaud Maggs (1926–2012), photographer
- Liz Magor (born 1948), visual artist
- Jeannie Mah (born 1952), ceramic artist
- Christine Major (born 1966), painter
- Lorraine Malach (1933–2003), ceramist
- Rafał Malczewski (1892–1965), landscape and portrait painter
- Jen Mann (born 1987), portrait artist
- Erin Manning (born 1969), artist, dancer, philosopher
- Kavavaow Mannomee (born 1958), printmaker
- Enook Manomie (1941–2006), carver
- Jovette Marchessault (1938–2012), artist, writer
- Charles Marega (1871–1939), sculptor
- Deborah Margo (born 1961), multimedia artist
- Robert Markle (1936–1990), painter, sculptor
- Tanya Mars (born 1948), performance & video artist
- Agnes Martin (1912–2004), painter
- Annie Martin, artist
- Arthur N. Martin (1889–1961), painter
- Bernice Fenwick Martin (1902–1999), painter, printmaker
- Camille Martin (born 1956), artist, poet
- Paryse Martin (born 1959), artist
- Ron Martin (born 1943), abstract painter
- Thomas Mower Martin (1838–1934), landscape painter
- Âhasiw Maskêgon-Iskwêw (1958–2006), media artist
- Mabel May (1877–1971), painter
- Elza Mayhew (1916–2004), sculptor
- Hannah Maynard (1834–1918), photographer
- Richard Maynard (1832–1907), photographer
- Sanaz Mazinani (born 1978), artist
- Jo-Anne McArthur (born 1976), photographer
- Kelly McCallum (born 1979), artist
- Doris McCarthy (1910–2010), painter, printmaker
- Ryan McCourt (born 1975), sculptor, designer
- Jillian McDonald, artist
- Clark McDougall (1921–1980), painter
- Susan McEachern (born 1951), artist
- Jean McEwen (1923–1999), abstract painter
- Elizabeth McGillivray Knowles (1866–1928), painter
- Florence Helena McGillivray (1864–1938), painter
- Barbara McGivern (1945–2019), painter
- Elizabeth McIntosh (born 1967), painter
- Rita McKeough (born 1951), installation and performance artist
- Mary R. McKie (active 1840–1862), painter
- Ruth Gowdy McKinley (1931–1981), ceramic artist
- Sheila McKinnon, photographer
- Isabel McLaughlin (1903–2002), painter, patron, philanthropist
- Helen McLean (1927–2017), painter, author
- Dayna McLeod (born 1972), artist
- Fannie Knowling McNeil (1860–1928), painter, suffragist
- Helen McNicoll (1879–1915), painter
- Ray Mead (1921–1998), painter
- Lucy Meeko (1929–2004), Inuk sculptor, printmaker, craft artist
- Divya Mehra (born 1981), multidisciplinary artist
- Sandra Meigs (born 1953), painter
- Ivar Mendez, photographer and sculptor
- Barbara Meneley, artist
- John Meredith (1933–2000), abstract painter
- Gwendolyn Mews (1893–1973), painter
- Tricia Middleton (born 1972), artist
- Arnold Mikelson (1922–1984), wood sculptor
- Lorri Millan (see Shawna Dempsey and Lorri Millan)
- Laura Millard (born 1961), mixed media artist, educator
- Kenneth G. Mills (1923–2004), painter
- Lorna Mills, new media artist
- Carol Milne (born 1962), sculptor
- David Milne (1882–1953), painter
- Lisa Milroy (born 1959), painter
- Olia Mishchenko (born 1980), artist
- Allyson Mitchell (born 1967), multidisciplinary artist
- Janet Mitchell (1912–1998), painter
- Ellen Moffat (born 1954), mixed media artist
- Esmaa Mohamoud (born 1992), sculptor, installation artist
- Leo Mol (1915–2009), sculptor
- Guido Molinari (1933–2004), painter
- Melinda Mollineaux (born 1964), visual artist
- Kent Monkman (born 1965), painter
- E. Louise De Montigny-Giguère (1878–1969), sculptor
- Geraldine Moodie (1854–1945), photographer
- Julie Moos (born 1966), photographer, writer
- Shani Mootoo (born 1957), painter
- Ron Moppett (born 1945), painter
- James Wilson Morrice (1865–1924), painter
- Edmund Montague Morris (1871–1913), painter
- Kathleen Morris (1893–1986), painter
- Michael Morris (1942–2022), visual artist, educator, curator
- Norval Morrisseau (1932–2007), painter
- Alexandra Morrison, photographer
- Rita Mount (1885–1967), painter
- Clara Mountcastle (1837–1908), painter, author
- Jean-Paul Mousseau (1927–1991), painter, ceramist, muralist
- Kellypalik Mungitok (1940–?), printmaker
- Kathleen Munn (1887–1974), painter
- Will Munro (1975–2010), artist
- Paula Murray (born 1958), ceramist
- Robert Murray (born 1936), sculptor
- Nadia Myre (born 1974), artist

=== N ===
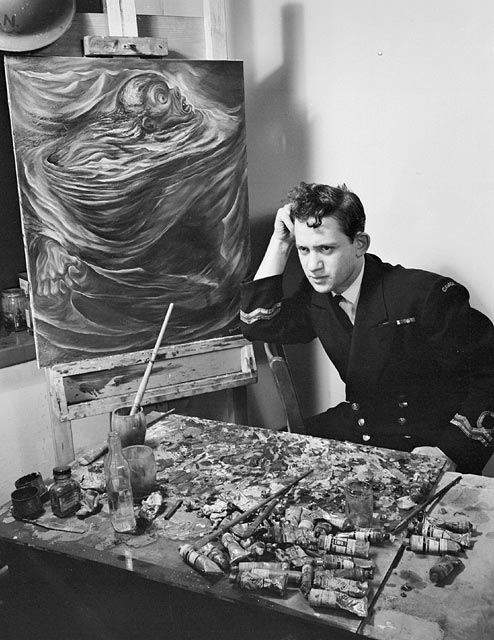
Jack Nichols

- Nakedpastor, cartoonist, painter
- Melaw Nakehk’o, filmmaker
- Agnes Nanogak (1925–2001), Inuk artist
- Mina Napartuk (1913–2001), Inuk textile artist, fashion designer
- Imona Natsiapik (born 1966), Inuk artist
- Ellen Neel (1916–1966), artist
- Tracey Neuls, artist
- Alison Houston Lockerbie Newton (1890–1967), painter
- Lilias Torrance Newton (1896–1980), painter
- Marion Nicoll (1909–1985), painter
- Jack Nichols (1921–2009), painter
- Grace Nickel (born 1956), ceramist
- Ekow Nimako (born 1979), Lego sculptor
- Shelley Niro (born 1954), painter
- Adamie Niviaxie (1925–?), sculptor
- Louise Noguchi (born 1958), multidisciplinary visual artist
- Arnold Nogy, painter
- Alice Nolin (1896–1967), sculptor
- Marie-Paule Nolin (1908–1987), fashion designer
- Farah Nosh, photojournalist
- Guity Novin (born 1944), painter
- Elizabeth Styring Nutt (1870–1946), painter

=== O ===
- Alanis Obomsawin (born 1932), Indigenous filmmaker
- John O'Brien (1831–1891), painter
- Lucius Richard O'Brien (1832–1899), painter, illustrator
- Daphne Odjig (1919–2016), painter
- Ethel Ogden (1869–1902), painter, educator
- Will Ogilvie (1901–1989), painter, war artist
- Katie Ohe (born 1937), sculptor
- Lucille Oille (1912–1997), sculptor, illustrator
- Maude Rachel Okittuq (born 1944), sculptor
- Bobbie Oliver (born 1943), abstract painter
- Kim Ondaatje (born 1928), painter, filmmaker
- Midi Onodera (born 1961), artist
- Jessie Oonark (1906–1985), Inuk artist
- Sheokjuk Oqutaq (1920–1982), sculptor
- Sheila Shaen Orr (born 1964), artist
- Nina May Owens (1869–1959), painter

=== P ===
- Charles Pachter (born 1942), artist, filmmaker, social commentator
- P. K. Page (1916–2010), painter, poet
- George Paginton (1901–1988), painter
- Josie Pamiutu Papialuk (1918–1996), printmaker and sculptor
- Aaron Paquette (born 1974), painter and writer
- Mimi Parent (1924–2005), painter
- Edie Parker (born 1956), artist
- Roula Partheniou (born 1977), artist
- Andrew James Paterson (born 1962), interdisciplinary artist
- Barbara Paterson (born 1935), artist
- Myfanwy Pavelic (1916–2017), painter
- Jan Peacock (born 1955), multidisciplinary artist
- Paul Peel (1860–1892), painter
- Sophie Pemberton (1869–1959), painter
- Freda Pemberton-Smith (1902–1991), painter
- Dany Pen (born 1986), artist, educator
- William Perehudoff (1918–2013), painter
- Rajni Perera (born 1985), painter, sculptor
- Rae Perlin (1910–2006), painter
- Vessna Perunovich (born 1960), painter, sculptor
- Sheouak Petaulassie (1918 or 1923–1961), printmaker
- Nancy Petry (1931–2024), artist
- Christiane Pflug (1936–1972), painter who also did drawings
- Ciara Phillips (born 1976), artist
- Paulette Phillips (born 1956), artist
- Rina Piccolo, cartoonist
- Ed Pien (born 1958), installation artist
- Marjorie Pigott (1904–1990), painter
- Bev Pike, painter, writer
- Robert Pilot (1898–1967), painter
- Leopold Plotek (born 1948), painter
- Susan Point (born 1952), artist
- Narcisse Poirier (1883–1984), painter
- Edward Poitras (born in 1953), sculptor, installation artist
- Jane Ash Poitras (born 1951), painter
- Annie Pootoogook (1969–2016), Inuk artist
- Eegyvudluk Pootoogook (1931–2000), printmaker, sculptor
- Kananginak Pootoogook (1935–2010), sculptor, printmaker
- Napachie Pootoogook (1938–2002), graphic artist
- Sharni Pootoogook (1922–2003), printmaker
- Alicia Popoff (1950–2015), painter
- Barbara Pratt (born 1963), painter
- Christopher Pratt (1935–2022), painter
- Mary Pratt (1935–2018), painter
- Ned Pratt (born 1964), photographer
- Mark Prent (1947–2020), sculptor, performance artist
- Innukjuakju Pudlat (1913–1972), printmaker
- Lucy Pullen (born 1971), artist

=== Q ===
- Ruth Qaulluaryuk (born 1932), Inuk textile artist
- Mary Qayuaryuk (1908–1982), printmaker
- Lucy Qinnuayuak (1915–1982), graphic artist and printmaker
- Nathalie Quagliotto (born 1984), artist

=== R ===
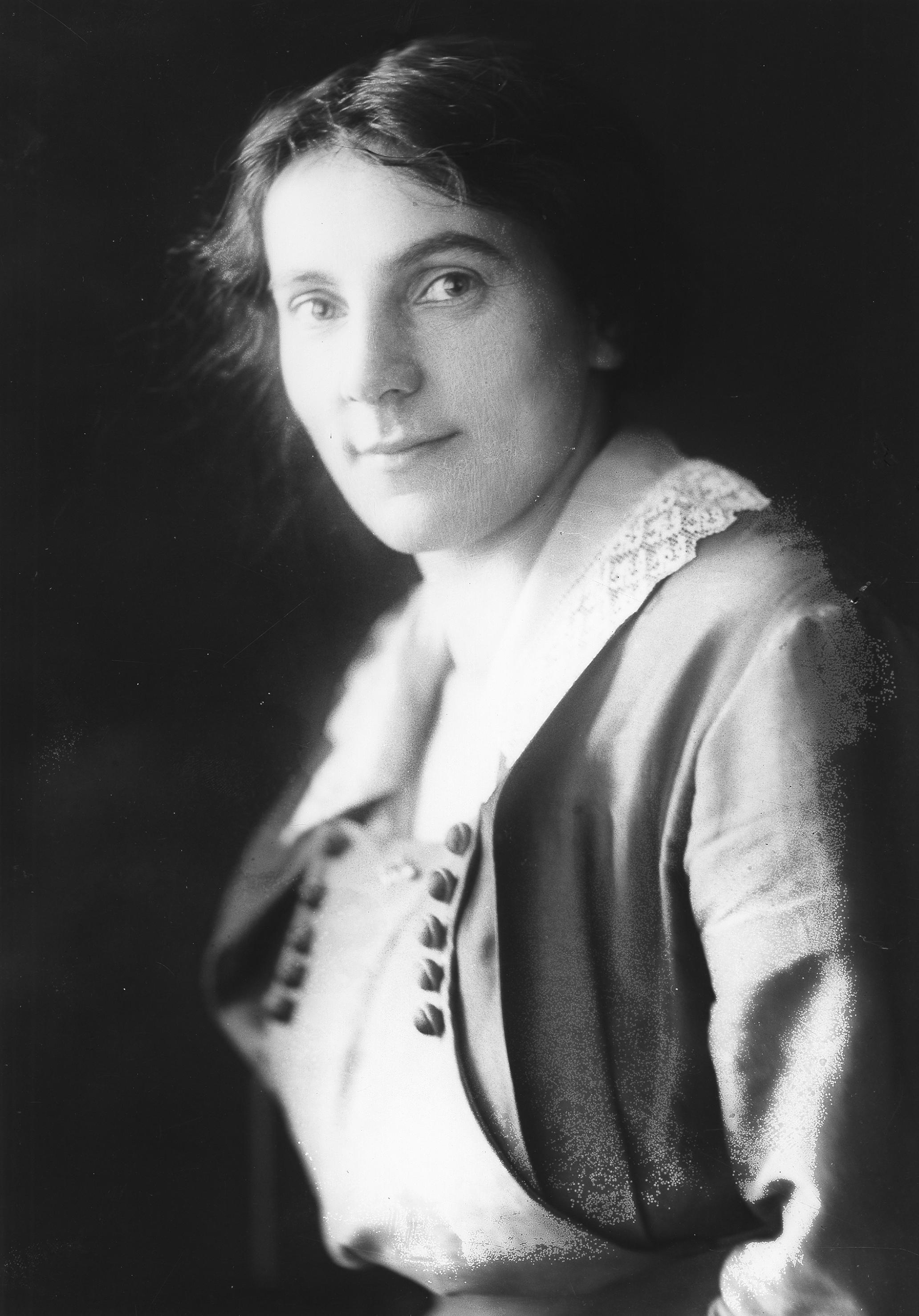
Gladys Reeves

- George Raab (born 1948), printmaker
- Rosemary Radcliffe (born 1949), painter, actress
- Judy Radul, multimedia artist
- Anirnik Ragee (born 1935), printmaker, sculptor
- Nina Raginsky (born 1941), photographer
- William Raphael (1833–1914), painter
- Gordon Rayner (1935–2010), abstract expressionist painter
- Walter Redinger (1940–2014), sculptor
- Gladys Reeves (1890–1974), photographer
- Don Reichert (1932–2013), painter, multimedia artist
- Bill Reid (1920–1998), sculptor
- George Agnew Reid (1860–1947), painter, influential educator, administrator
- Leslie Reid (born 1947), painter, printmaker
- Mary Hiester Reid (1854–1921), painter
- Reinhard Reitzenstein (born 1949), environmental sculptor
- Sheilah Wilson ReStack (born 1975), video artist
- Kina Reusch (1940–1988), artist
- Catherine Richards (born 1952), artist
- Sue Richards (1958–2014), artist
- Kelly Richardson (born 1972), video artist, photographer
- Lynn Richardson, artist
- Jean-Paul Riopelle (1923–2002), painter
- Jim Robb (born 1933), Yukon watercolour painter
- Louise Robert (born 1941), painter
- Goodridge Roberts (1904–1974), painter
- Sarah Robertson (1891–1948), painter
- Albert H. Robinson (1881–1956), landscape painter
- David Robinson (born 1964), figurative sculptor
- Mélanie Rocan (born 1980), painter
- Christine Roche (born 1939), illustrator, cartoonist
- Danièle Rochon (born 1946), painter
- Dorothea Rockburne (born 1932), painter
- Brent Roe (born 1956), painter
- David Rokeby (born 1960), new media artist
- William Ronald (1926–1998), painter
- Ethel Rosenfield (1910–2000), sculptor
- Elizabeth Eaton Rosenthal (born 1941), artist
- Hilda Katherine Ross (1902-unknown), ceramic artist, painter
- Susan Ross (1915–2006), painter
- Evelyn Roth (born 1936), interdisciplinary artist
- Alix Cléo Roubaud (1952–1983), photographer, writer
- Mariette Rousseau-Vermette (1926–2006), tapestry artist
- Marina Roy, painter
- Endel Ruberg (1917–1989), artist, educator
- Jeffrey Rubinoff (1945–2017), sculptor, founder of the Jeffrey Rubinoff Sculpture Park on Hornby Island
- John Wentworth Russell (1879–1959), painter
- Lorna Russell (1933–2023), painter
- Erica Rutherford (1923–2008), painter, filmmaker, writer
- Su Rynard (born 1961), video artist, film director
- Meyer Ryshpan (1898–1985), painter

=== S ===
- Pitaloosie Saila (1949–2021), artist
- Buffy Sainte-Marie (born 1941), painter, singer/song writer
- Nicotye Samayualie (born 1983), graphic artist
- Taslim Samji, artist
- Eliyakota Samualie (1939–1987), graphic artist, sculptor
- Benita Sanders (born 1935), printmaker, painter, pastelist
- Nancy Saunders (born 1986), Inuk multidisciplinary artist
- Anne Savage (1896–1971), painter
- Henry Saxe (born 1937), sculptor, painter, draughtsman
- Carl Schaefer (1903–1995), painter, war artist
- Tony Scherman (1950–2023), painter
- Charlotte Schreiber (1834–1922), painter
- Jacques Schyrgens (1923–2014), painter, illustrator
- John Scott (1950–2022), painter
- Marian Dale Scott (1906–1993), painter
- Mary Scott (born 1948), painter
- Ethel Seath (1879–1963), painter, printmaker
- Regina Seiden (1897–1991), painter
- Sandra Semchuk (born 1948), photographer
- Catherine Senitt (born 1945), painter
- Bojana Sentaler, fashion designer
- Aqjangajuk Shaa (1937–2019), stone carver
- Jack Shadbolt (1909–1998), painter
- Susan Shantz (born 1957), sculptor
- Steven Shearer (born 1968), painter, draughtsman
- Margaret Shelton (1915–1984), artist
- Helen Parsons Shepherd (1923–2008), painter
- Peter Clapham Sheppard (1879–1964), painter
- Erin Shirreff (born 1975), artist
- Henrietta Shore (1880–1963), painter
- Coral Short (born 1973), performance artist
- Terence Michael Shortt (1910–1986), artist, writer
- Edward Scrope Shrapnel (1845–1920), painter
- Ron Shuebrook (born 1943), abstract painter, administrator
- Joe Shuster (1914–1992), cartoonist
- Adele Sigguk (born 1961), artist
- Floria Sigismondi (born 1965), photographer, filmmaker
- Krystle Silverfox, Selkirk First Nation interdisciplinary artist
- Dave Sim (born 1956), comic book artist
- Elizabeth Simcoe (1762–1850), painter
- Lorraine Simms (born 1956), painter
- Ellen Rosalie Simon (1916–2011), stained-glass artist, illustrator, printmaker
- James Simpkins (1910–2004), cartoonist, illustrator, film strips
- Dionne Simpson (born 1972), textile artist
- Leah Singer, photographer, multi-media artist
- Clara Sipprell (1885–1975), photographer
- Cathy Sisler, artist
- Charlie Sivuarapik (1911–1968), sculptor, illustrator, and storyteller
- Ruby Slipperjack (born 1952), Ojibwe painter, writer
- Paul Sloggett (born 1950), abstract painter
- Damien Smith (born 1969), visual artist
- Edith Smith (1867–1954), painter
- Gord Smith (1937–2023), sculptor
- Gordon A. Smith (1919–2020), painter, printmaker, sculptor
- Jean Smith (born 1959), musician, painter, author
- Jori Smith (1907–2005), painter
- Michael Snow (1928–2023), painter, filmmaker, musician
- Nicolas Sollogoub (1925–2014), sculptor, glassmaker
- Daniel Solomon (born 1945), abstract painter
- Frances-Anne Solomon (born 1966), filmmaker
- David G. Sorensen (1937–2011), painter, sculptor
- Doris Huestis Speirs (1894–1989), painter, poet, ornithologist
- David Spriggs (born 1978), sculptor, installation artist
- Gerald Squires (1937–2015), painter, printmaker, sculptor
- Marie Elyse St. George (born 1929), artist, poet
- Helen Stadelbauer (1910–2006), painter
- Arlene Stamp (born 1938), conceptual artist and designer
- Tank Standing Buffalo, illustrator and animator
- Owen Staples (1866–1949), painter, etcher, political cartoonist
- Lisa Steele (born 1947), video artist
- Barbara Steinman (born 1950), video and installation artist
- Godfrey Stephens (born 1939), painter, sculptor, boat builder
- Jana Sterbak (born 1955), sculptor
- Noreen Stevens (born 1952), cartoonist
- Penelope Stewart, artist
- Ginny Stikeman (born 1941), filmmaker
- Reva Stone (born 1944), digital artist
- Ron Stonier (1933–2001), abstract painter
- Leesa Streifler (born 1957), painter
- Martha Sturdy (born 1942), artist, designer
- Rudolf Stussi (born 1947), painter
- Jack Sures (1934–2018), ceramist
- Marc Aurèle de Foy Suzor-Coté (1869–1937), painter, sculptor
- Gio Swaby (born 1941), textile artist
- Magda Szabo (1934–2024), painter
- Gabor Szilasi (born 1928), photographer

=== T ===
- Tanya Tagaq (born 1975), artist, musician
- Ernestine Tahedl (born 1940), painter
- Sylvia Tait (born 1932), painter
- Ho Tam (born 1962), book artist, photographer
- Jillian Tamaki (born 1980), illustrator, comic artist
- Mariko Tamaki (born 1975), artist, writer
- Otis Tamasauskas (born 1947), printmaker, painter
- Takao Tanabe (born 1926), painter
- Janice Tanton (born 1961), artist
- Monica Tap (born 1962), painter
- Ewa Tarsia (born 1959), painter, printmaker
- Mary Tassugat (1918–2016), Inuk artist
- Tanya Taylor, fashion designer
- Angotigolu Teevee (1910–1967), printmaker
- Jamasie Teevee (1910–1985), printmaker
- Ningeokuluk Teevee (born 1963), illustrator
- Mashel Teitelbaum (1921–1985), painter
- Nalenik Temela (1939–2003), sculptor
- Louis Temporale (1909–1994), sculptor
- Althea Thauberger (born 1970), photographer
- David Thauberger (born 1948), painter
- Genevieve Thauvette (born 1985), photographer
- Jeannie Thib (1955–2013), sculptor
- Jeff Thomas (born 1956), photo-based storyteller
- Denyse Thomasos (1964–2012), painter
- Tom Thomson (1877–1917), painter
- Diana Thorneycroft (born 1956), photographer
- Jan Thornhill (born 1955), illustrator, writer
- Mildred Valley Thornton (1890–1967), painter
- Irene Avaalaaqiaq Tiktaalaaq (born 1941), artist
- George Campbell Tinning (1910–1996), painter, graphic designer, muralist, illustrator
- Joanne Tod (born 1953), artist
- Gentile Tondino (1923–2001), painter
- Anna Torma (born 1952), fibre artist
- Serge Tousignant (born 1942), multidisciplinary artist, photographer
- Gayla Trail (born 1973), photographer
- Jackie Traverse (born 1969), painter
- Julie Tremble, animator, experimental videographer
- Angus Trudeau (1905–1984), painter, builder of ship models
- Akesuk Tudlik (1890–1966), printmaker and carver
- Sydney Strickland Tully (1860–1911), artist
- Camille Turner (born 1960), artist
- Natalie Turner, artist
- Lucy Tasseor Tutsweetok (1934–2012), sculptor
- Marion Tuu’luq (1910–2002), Inuk textile artist

=== U ===
- Kartz Ucci (1961–2013), artist
- Ina D.D. Uhthoff (1889–1971), painter
- Malorie Urbanovitch (born 1988), fashion designer

=== V ===
- Armand Vaillancourt (born 1929), performance art, sculptor, painter
- Florence Vale (1909–2003), painter
- Claire Van Vliet (born 1933), artist
- Liz Vandal (fl. 1988), fashion designer
- Margaret Elizabeth Vanderhaeghe (1950–2012), artist
- John Vanderpant (1884–1939), photographer, gallery owner, author
- Frederick Varley (1881–1969), painter
- Bill Vazan (born 1933), land art, sculptor, photographer, painter
- Quentin VerCetty, sculptor
- Claude Vermette (1930–2006), painter, ceramist
- Frederick Arthur Verner (1836–1928), painter
- Roy Henry Vickers (born 1946), painter, printmaker, carver
- Laura Vickerson (born 1959), installation artist
- Arthur Villeneuve (1910–1990), painter
- Rita Vinieris, fashion designer
- Lea Vivot (born 1948), sculptor
- Ola Volo, muralist
- Julie Voyce (born 1957), multi-media artist, printmaker

=== W ===
- Marion Wagschal (born 1943), painter
- Carol Wainio (born 1955), painter
- Ruth Salter Wainwright (1902–1984), painter
- Horatio Walker (1858–1938), painter
- Laurie Walker (1962–2011), artist
- Jeff Wall (born 1946), photographer
- Katherine Wallis (1861–1957), sculptor
- Esther Warkov (born 1941), painter
- Lowrie Warrener (1900–1983), painter
- Margaret Watkins (1884–1969), photographer
- Edith Watson (1861–1943), photographer
- Homer Watson (1855–1936), painter
- Barbara Weaver-Bosson, painter
- Gordon Webber (1909–1965), multi-media
- Anna Weber (1814–1888), fraktur artist, needleworker
- Laura Wee Láy Láq (born 1952), Sto:lo ceramic artist
- Susanna Haliburton Weldon (1871–1899), artist
- Esther Wertheimer (1926–2016), sculptor, educator
- W. P. Weston (1879–1967), painter, teacher
- Phil R. White (born 1963), sculptor
- Diane Whitehouse (born 1940), painter
- Colette Whiten (born 1945), sculptor
- Tim Whiten (born 1941), sculptor, performance & installation artist
- Irene Whittome (born 1942), multimedia artist
- Peter and Catharine Whyte (1905–1966, 1906–1979), painters
- Joyce Wieland (1930–1998), multimedia artist
- Robert Wiens (born 1953), painter, sculptor
- Shirley Wiitasalo (born 1949), painter
- Peter Wilkins (born 1968), multimedia artist
- Tania Willard (born 1977), Indigenous artist
- Jennifer Willet (born 1975), artist, curator
- Yvonne Williams (1901–1997), stained glass artist
- Curtis Williamson (1867–1944), painter
- Margaux Williamson (born 1976), artist
- Jeff Willmore (born 1954), painter, performance artist
- Robert Willms (born 1969), sculptor
- Joan Willsher-Martel (1925–2017), painter
- Shannon Wilson, fashion designer
- York Wilson (1907–1984), painter, muralist
- Rita Winkler (born 1987), artist
- Winsom (born 1946), multimedia artist
- Chloe Wise (born 1990), artist
- Catherine Mary Wisnicki (1919–2014), artist
- Colleen Wolstenholme (born 1963), sculptor
- Anna Wong (1930–2013), printmaker
- Elizabeth Wyn Wood (1903–1966), sculptor
- Susan Wood (1954–2018), artist
- Leonard Woods (1919–2014), sculptor
- Hilda Woolnough (1934–2007), printmaker, painter, draughtsman
- Kamila Wozniakowska (born 1956), painter
- Andrew Wright (born 1971), multimedia artist
- Janice Wright Cheney (born 1961), artist
- Mary E. Wrinch (1877–1969), painter, printmaker
- Adrienne Wu (born 1990), fashion designer
- Florence Wyle (1881–1968), sculptor
- Dana Wyse (born 1965), installation artist

=== X ===
- Gu Xiong (born 1953), multidisciplinary artist

=== Y ===
- Xiaojing Yan (born 1978), sculptor, installation artist
- Walter Yarwood (1917–1996), painter
- M. A. Yewdale (1908–2000), artist
- Jin-me Yoon (born 1960), multimedia artist
- Cecil Youngfox (1942–1987), painter
- Jinny Yu (born 1976), painter, installation artist

=== Z ===
- Jarko Zavi (1907–1987), ceramist
- Joy Zemel Long (1922–2018), painter
- Robert Zend (1929–1985), typewriter, collage, multimedia, and digital artist; concrete poet
- Lorena Ziraldo (born 1960), painter
- Edward "Ted" Fenwick Zuber (1932–2018), painter, photographer
- Tim Zuck (1947–2022), painter
- Marguerite Porter Zwicker (1904–1993), painter

== Groups ==
- Les Automatistes
- Beaver Hall Group
- Canadian Group of Painters
- ChromaZone/Chromatique Collective
- Eastern Group of Painters
- General Idea
- Group of Seven
- The Non-Figurative Artists' Association of Montreal
- Painters Eleven
- Professional Native Indian Artists Inc. (informally known as "Indian Group of Seven")
- Regina Five
- The Royal Art Lodge

== See also ==
- Canadian art
- List of Canadian painters
- List of Canadian women artists
