= Stonier =

Stonier is a surname. Notable people with the surname include:

- G. W. Stonier (1903–1985), English critic, novelist and radio playwright and a literary editor of the New Statesman
- Matthew Stonier (born 2001), English athlete
- Michael Stonier (born 1969), South African cricketer
- Monica Stonier (born 1976), American politician of the Democratic Party
- Nigel Stonier (born 1956), English rock, roots and pop producer, songwriter and multi-instrumentalist
- Ron Stonier (1933–2001), Canadian painter
- Tom Stonier (1927–1999), German biologist and educator
