= Lynn Richardson =

Canadian artist

Lynn Richardson (born in Winnipeg, Manitoba, Canada) is a Canadian artist and sculptor based in Winnipeg.

== Career ==
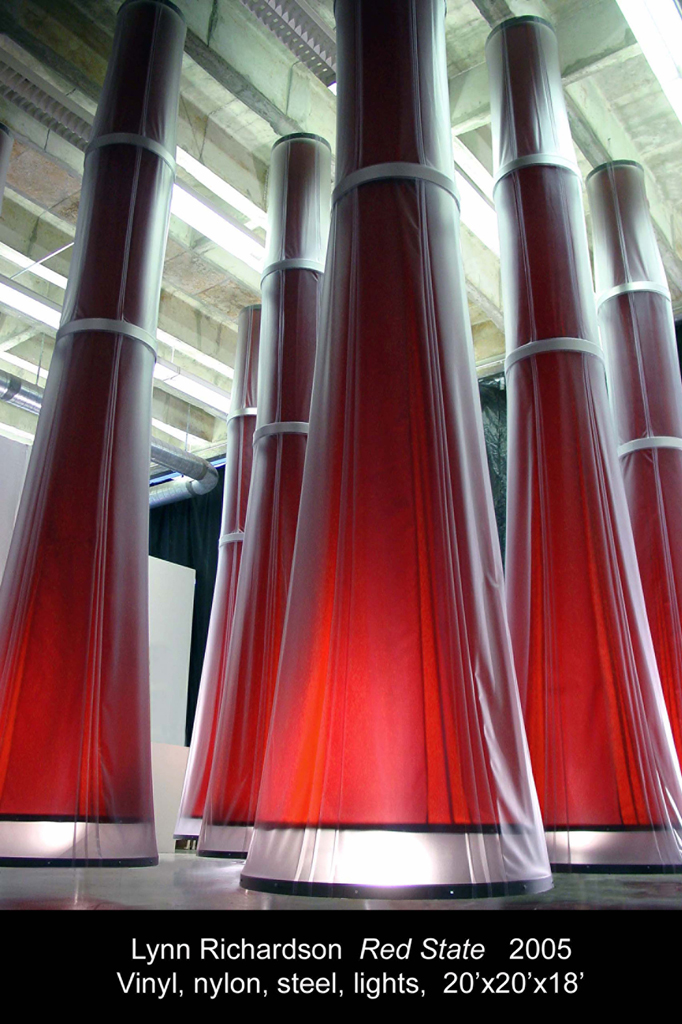
Red State

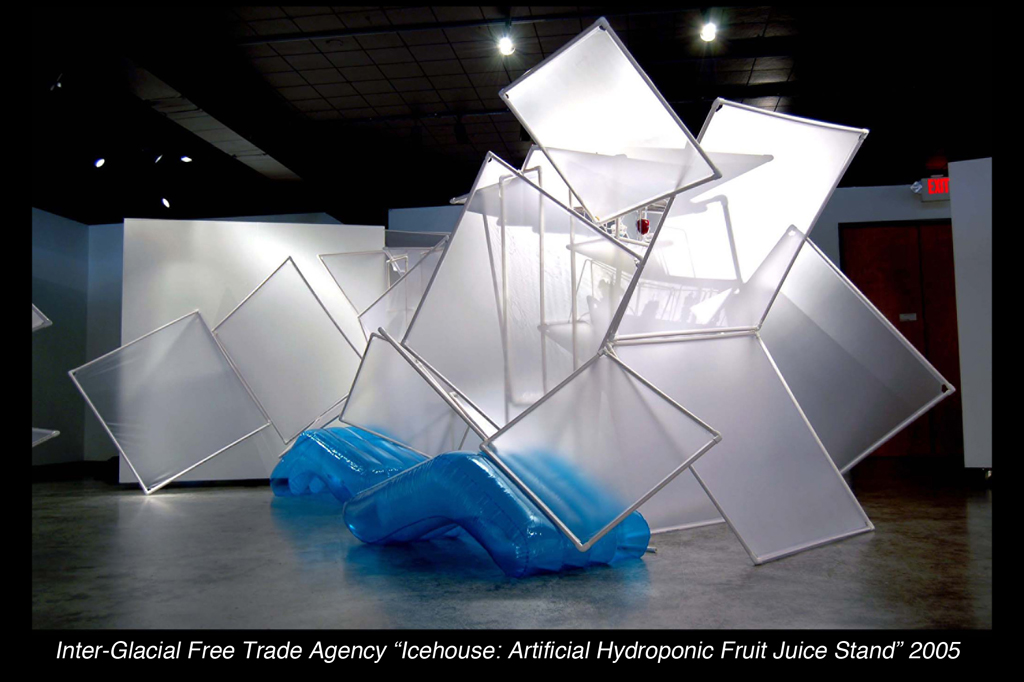
Inter-glacial

In 1998, Richardson received an Honours BFA from the University of Manitoba. In 2005 she completed an MFA in Sculpture at the University of Texas at Austin and also received the Joan Mitchell Foundation MFA Grant in New York.

Richardson has presented her sculpture in numerous exhibitions throughout Canada, the United States and Taiwan. Her large-scale installation Red State was featured in the Supernovas group show at the Winnipeg Art Gallery and at the Michael Gibson Gallery in London, Ontario. Her solo exhibitions include a presentation of Inter-glacial Free Trade Agency.ca at Regina's Dunlop Art Gallery in 2007 and a series of new works at Harcourt House in Edmonton in 2008.

Richardson has received art awards including grants from the Winnipeg Arts Council, Manitoba Arts Council and the Canada Council for the Arts. She has taught sculpture at the University of Manitoba School of Art and courses at the University of Texas. In 2007, she was artist-in-residence at the Bemis Center for Contemporary Art in Omaha, Nebraska.

== Reception ==
Critic Peter Goddard described Richardson's Inter-Glacial Free Trade Agency.ca as giving the message "Any bleak future can look terrific if it just has the right design." In Goddard's view, Richardson is creating a "brave new northland" (of Canada), where a "wonderfully deadpan installation" gentrifies the oil rigs in the tundra; where protective suits "come in zippy matching colours" and even the reindeer are glammed-up.

Art critic Amy Karlinsky, writing in BorderCrossings, opined that Richardson's "minimal and collapsible" Red State "hinted at her capacity to generate metaphor": its "monumentality" was "all sham and seductive illusion – a tidy reference to both art and politics". And Karlinsky had earlier enjoyed "Richardson's fabulous and funny kinetic sculptures of 2002", which in her view "invited viewer participation and provided wry commentary on Canadian icons and symbolism". But Karlinsky found Inter-Glacial Free Trade Agency.ca "more fraught" by contrast, and agreed with the exhibition curator that Richardson's environmental concerns were integral to her works and had "catalyzed" her into production. How, she wondered, did you suggest something as vast as the Arctic? "A simulated and disjointed landscape confronts the viewer. It is a depopulated, dystopic scenario" with strange artistic details. "Much is eerie, evocative and otherworldly."
