= Adele Sigguk =

Inuk artist

- Born: 1961 (age 64–65); Nunavut

Adele Sigguk (born 1961) is an Inuk artist from Kugaaruk, Nunavut.

Her work is included in the collections of the Musée national des beaux-arts du Québec and the Museum of Anthropology at UBC.
