= Simone Dénéchaud =

Canadian painter and educator (1905–1974)

- Born: 1905; Montreal, Canada
- Died: 1974 (aged 68–69); Montreal, Canada
- Education: École des beaux-arts de Montréal
- Occupations: Painter and educator

Simone Dénéchaud (1905 – 1974) was a Canadian painter and educator who lived in Quebec.

She was born in Montreal and studied at the École des beaux-arts de Montréal; on her graduation in 1928, she received the gold medal for painting and first prize for decorative composition. She travelled in Europe and, on her return to Canada, taught drawing at the École des beaux-arts from 1929 to 1942 and also taught with the Commission des écoles catholiques de Montreal. She took part in group shows at the Scott Gallery in Montreal and with the Art Association of Montreal and had a solo show at the École des beaux-arts in 1941.

She died in Montreal in 1974.

Her work is included in the collections of the Musée national des beaux-arts du Québec and the Musee du Seminaire du Quebec. Rue Simone-Dénéchaud in Montreal was named in her honour.
