= Catherine Bolduc =

Canadian artist

- Born: 1970 (age 55–56); Quebec, Canada
- Website: catherinebolduc.com

Catherine Bolduc (born 1970 in Quebec, Canada) is a contemporary visual artist.

== Biography ==
Catherine Bolduc acquired a B.A. in Art History from the Université de Montréal in 1993. She has a B.A. in Fine Arts from the Université du Québec à Montréal, which she completed in 1997, and in 2005 Bolduc got a M.F.A. in Fine Arts from the Université du Québec à Montréal as well. In 2007–2008, Bolduc did a residency at Künstlerhaus Bethanien in Berlin,

In 2017, she was nominee for the Prix du Recit, awarded by Radio Canada. Her work is included in the collection of the Musée des beaux-arts de Montréal, the Musée national des beaux-arts du Québec and the City of Montreal public art collection.

== Themes and motifs ==
Bolduc takes a feminist stance in her practice. Catherine Bolduc's art pieces are an invitation to experience fantasy but also where magic reveals its dark side, her aesthetic intention is to oscillate between the evocation of human vulnerability in front of the discrepancy of reality with desires and the reconciliation by a celebration of the poetic power of the banal.

== Grants and awards ==
She won the Powerhouse Prize from La Centrale Galerie Powerhouse (2013).

== Notable solo shows ==
In 2015, she created La femme dans la lune/Her Head in the Clouds in The Rooms Provincial Art Gallery Division in Saint John's, Newfoundland and Labrador. In 2019, Parallel life was displayed at Galerie D-Este in Montreal and was one of the first times Bolduc focused her drawings in an exhibition, the first being La femme dans la lune. The most recent was Late Cosmetics, at the Val-David Exhibition Center in Quebec.

== Public art ==
In 2014, she created Domestic Angels in the City of Montreal (Bureau d'art public, Cty of Montreal). In 2016, she had two public art commissions in Quebec, Fais de beaux rêves and La Ronde des Choux.

== Critic reviews ==
Critics generally praise Bolduc's exuberant artistic methods. In her work for The Parallel Life, she is praised for sticking to her signature as her watercolours and acrylic drawings reflects the extravagance of her previous installations, Bolduc uses the same approach to infuse imagination and illusion into generic objects. Bolduc contrasts the rigid appearance of the drawings with a series of colourful explosions. In My air châteaux, Bolduc is praised for her liberating use of bright colours as she uses them to disguise reality.

For her work in La femme dans la lune, Bolduc disrupts the problematic narrative of peaceful colonization and empty Canadian landscapes by creating art that is filled with uncertainty, darkness, and erasure. Bolduc makes a powerful statement against terra nullius to remind viewers of the problematic histories that are filled with possession, erasure, and exploitation.
