= Christine Major =

Canadian painter (born 1966)

- Born: 1966 (age 58–59); Quebec City, Quebec, Canada
- Education: University of Ottawa
- Alma mater: Université du Québec à Montréal
- Known for: Painter

Christine Major (born 1966) is a Canadian painter.

== Life and work ==
Christine Major was born in Quebec City, Quebec, in 1966. Major earned her Bachelor of Fine Arts from the University of Ottawa and her Master of Fine Arts from the Université du Québec à Montréal. She lives and works in Montreal and teaches at the Université du Québec à Montréal. Women are generally the subject of Major's paintings, with domestic violence being a common theme.

== Collections ==
- Cuisine Rouge, 2010, Université du Québec à Montréal
- Collection Musée national des beaux-arts du Québec

== Exhibitions ==
- "Her Story Today", 2015–16, Montreal Museum of Fine Arts.
- "The Disorderless of Things", 2015, Galerie de l'UQAM, University of Quebec
