= Sheila Shaen Orr =

Canadian artist (born 1964)

- Born: 1964; Prince Albert, Saskatchewan, Canada
- Education: First Nations University of Canada, University of Regina

Sheila Orr (born 1964) is a Canadian artist of Cree, Scots, and Inuit heritage.

Born in Prince Albert, Saskatchewan, Orr grew up in Chisasibi, Quebec but returned to Saskatchewan to attend the Saskatchewan Indian Federated College (known now as the First Nations University of Canada) at the age of 16, where she received a degree in Fine Arts. She attended the University of Regina where she completed the Arts Education program with a major in visual arts.

== Career ==
Orr's artistic works mix traditional media such as porcupine quills and beadwork with acrylics and canvas. An exhibit of her work, titled In-fringe-ment, opened at the Little Gallery in Prince Albert, Saskatchewan in 1999. The exhibition featured mixed media ranging from "household cupboards and moose antlers to traditional oil paintings to explore the theme of infringement on First Nations life by white society." Her work Hand-Drum was featured on the cover of a book titled First Nations: Race, Class, and Gender Relations by Vic Satzewich, published in 2000.

She teaches traditional arts at the First Nations University of Canada where she has also held the position of head of the Department of Fine Arts. Additionally, she serves on the board of directors of the Saskatchewan Arts Board.

== Sources ==
- Orr, Sheila, and Lee-Ann Martin. 2000. Sheila Orr. Regina, Sask: MacKenzie Art Gallery.
- Patrick Douad and Bruce Dawson, Editors, 2002 Plain Speaking, Essays on Aboriginal People and the Prairie. Regina: Canadian Plains Resource Centre.
- "Sheila Shaen Orr" Creeculture.ca. copy archived March 12, 2016
