= Lorraine Bénic =

Canadian artist

Lorraine Bénic (born July 27, 1937) is a Canadian painter, sculptor and printmaker.

== Career ==
Bénic was born in Montreal. She studied at the Ecole des Beaux-Arts (1958–1962) and engraving in Paris (1963–1965). Following her studies, she taught engraving in Fontainebleau, Paris, Nice, and Saint-Paul-de-Vence (1965–19 1). She has received scholarships from the Quebec Ministry of Cultural Affairs and was also awarded an etching prize from Loto-Quebec in 1987.

Her work is included in the collections of the Musée national des beaux-arts du Québec and the Musée d'Art Moderne de Paris
