= Kellypalik Mungitok =

Inuk printmaker (born 1940)

Kellypalik Mungitok (also known as Mungitok Kellypalik, Mungituk, Mangitak, Mangitak Qillipalik, or Mungitok Killipalik) (1940–?) was an Inuk printmaker from Cape Dorset.

== Early life ==
As a child, Mungitok learned to hunt from his father, Oshutsiaq Pudlat, a lay minister. His paternal grandmother was a shaman. Around 1958, he and his parents moved to Cape Dorset.

== Career ==
He was known for his prints, but also worked in sculpture. One of his best-known prints, Man Carried to the Moon, depicts birds carrying a smiling man into the air.

Mungitok was married.

== Collections ==
- National Museum of the American Indian,
- University of Michigan Museum of Art
- National Gallery of Canada the Canadian Museum of History
- Museum London
- University of Victoria Art Collections
- Brooklyn Museum
