= Vessna Perunovich =

Canadian visual artist

- Born: 1960 (age 65–66); Zaječar, Serbia, FPR Yugoslavia

Vessna Perunovich is a Canadian / Serbian visual artist based in Toronto, Ontario and Belgrade, Serbia.

She was born in 1960 in Zaječar, Serbia, FPR Yugoslavia. Her father was originally from Montenegro and her mother was from Serbia, born in North Macedonia. She earned her B.F.A in 1984 at the Academy of Fine Arts at the University of Belgrade, Yugoslavia. She earned her M.F.A. also from the Academy of Fine Arts at the University of Belgrade in 1987. She immigrated with her family (husband and daughter) to Toronto in 1988.

In 2004, she was invited to the University of Guelph in Ontario to guest lecture. In 2004 she was invited to participate at the thematic Artist Residency Informal Architectures Symposium in Banff, Alberta to create work and to do an artist presentation. She was a sessional teacher at the Ontario College of Art and Design in Toronto from 2005 until 2011. Her most recent artist presentation was at the Museum of Contemporary Art Belgrade coinciding with her solo survey exhibition at the Gallery-Legacy Milica Zorić and Rodoljub Čolaković in 2023. Other artist presentations include Ontario College of Art and Design in Toronto and the other one in Havana, Cuba for the "International Artists' Presentation".

Perunovich works in a variety of media including sculpture, painting, drawing, video installation, performance and artist books, mediums which are usually combined in the exhibition format into an interdisciplinary installation. She utilizes her materials aiming for the economy of means in an attempt to express the most with the least amount of materials. She uses unconventional materials in her sculptural and installation work, such as pantyhose, nylon, rubber bands, zip-ties etc. "The use of pantyhose for Perunovich is emblematic of society's efforts to contain and restrict our freedom, symbolizing the behavioral codes imposed upon us which prevent us from realizing our dreams and aspirations. "Vessna's multi-media explorations are inspired and derived from her personal experiences, yet they have an effect on all of our experiences; from our collective memories, anxieties, questions and desires. She utilizes her materials and converts them into imaginative depictions of the body, while exploring the conflicting boundaries of pleasure and pain. Perunovich filled pantyhose with everyday objects to stretch the material to test its physical limits.

== Solo exhibitions ==
- 2015: Border Stitching (Oboro, Montreal, Quebec)
- 2004: Whole - House In Exile (Hamilton Artists Inc., Hamilton, Ontario)
- 2003: (W)hole (Lonsdale Gallery, Toronto, Ontario)

== Group exhibitions ==
- 2008: Re: Location (Ace Art Gallery, Winnipeg, Manitoba)
- 2008: Transitory Places (Occurrence, Montreal, Quebec)
- 2007: The Structure Of Survival (Galerie du Nouvel Ontario, Sudbury, Ontario)
- 2006: Parallel World (Vu, Quebec City, Quebec)
- 2000: Collective Unconscious Project 2 (Harbourfront Centre, Toronto, Ontario)
