= Theodosia Bond =

Canadian art collector (1915–2009)

Theodosia Mary Dawes Bond (1915 – October 27, 2009) was a Canadian art collector and amateur photographer living in Quebec. She was also known as Theodosia Dawes Bond Thornton.

The daughter of Rachel Mary Dawes and F. Lorne Campbell Bond, vice-president of Canadian National Railway for eastern Canada, she was born in Montreal, Quebec, and studied at the New York Institute of Photography. She was a member of the Montreal Camera Club and an associate of the Royal Photographic Society. Bond was mainly interested in photographing plant life and landscapes.

She married Robert Buchanan Thornton. The couple collected art, being particularly interested in the Group of Seven.

Bond died in Montreal at the age of 93.
