= Jennifer Willet =

Canadian artist, researcher and curator

- Born: 1975 (age 50–51); Calgary, Canada

Academic background
- Education: BFA, 1997, University of Calgary; MFA, 1999, University of Guelph PhD, interdisciplinary Humanities, 2009, Concordia University
- Thesis: (RE)embodying biotechnology: towards the democratization of biotechnology through embodied art practices. (2009)
- Website: incubatorartlab.com

Jennifer S. Willet (born 1975) is a Canadian artist, researcher, and curator. She is a professor in the School of Creative Arts at the University of Windsor and a Canada Research Chair in Art, Science and Ecology. Since 2009, Willet has served as the founder and director of the Incubator Art Lab.

== Early life and education ==
Willet was born in 1975. Growing up in Calgary, she received a 1991–92 Rutherford Scholarship while attending Lord Beaverbrook High School. Following high school, Willet completed her Bachelor of Fine Arts degree at the University of Calgary in 1997. During her undergraduate studies, she drew anatomical studies of human cadavers at the Cumming School of Medicine. She then completed her Master of Fine Arts degree at the University of Guelph and her PhD from Concordia University in interdisciplinary Humanities. While conducting her PhD research, she worked with an artist collective called BIOTEKNICA and completed a residency at SymbioticA in Australia. Willet also taught Studio Arts at Concordia and at the Art and Genomics Centre at the Leiden University.

== Career ==
In 2009, Willet established the first biological art laboratory in Canada called INCUBATOR: Hybrid Laboratory at the Intersection of Art, Science, and Ecology at the University of Windsor. As the director of this laboratory, she also founded the BioARTCAMP to build a portable biology laboratory that served as a field research station housing a functional biological sciences lab and a variety of art/science projects. The pieces created at BioARTCAMP were then displayed at Artcite Gallery in the NATURAL SCIENCE exhibit. In 2017, Willet was elected a Member of the Royal Society of Canada's (RSC) College of New Scholars, Artists, and Scientists for being "an innovator in the field of bioart, merging artistic and biotechnical research." She was also named a Tier 2 Canada Research Chair in Art, Science and Ecology.

Willet used the funding from her Canada Research Chair appointment to create the Incubator Art Lab in downtown Windsor. During the COVID-19 pandemic, she contributed to a virtual exhibition by the RSC in response to the challenges of the pandemic. Her exhibition was images of her going through daily life in a bedazzled hazmat suit to "explore the shared experiences of fear and isolation under orders to stay at home." Willet also received a Partnership Engage Grant from the Social Sciences and Humanities Research Council to conduct online workshops and creative presentations.
