= Rita Vinieris =

Canadian fashion designer

- Spouse: Tony Giancola
- Children: 2
- Awards: 2007 Best Ad Campaign 2006 Best Ad Campaign; 2002 New Designer of the Year...
- Website: https://www.ritavinieris.com/

Rita Vinieris (born 1964) is a Canadian fashion designer known for her luxury Bridal Collections, such as RIVINI and Alyne. Vinieris also debuted her first Evening Wear Collection in February 2013.

== Early life and education ==
Rita Vinieris was born and raised in Canada, the daughter of immigrants from Greece. She attended the University of Toronto where she studied Economics but did not graduate. She later studied fashion at the International Academy of Design.

== Career ==
Vinieris worked at a boutique as a designer for six years. She then freelanced as a designer for Izod Lacoste Mens Canada for a year, designed furs for the Japanese market, freelanced and designed evening gowns for private clients, and later was the Design Coordinator for Fairweathers for two years.

In 1995, after helping several friends choose wedding dresses, Vinieris began to design the collection of wedding dresses under the name "Rivini."

A separate dress line was later added under the brand Aylene. In 2013, Vinieris expanded her fashion line to include evening wear, and showed her debut collection at the Baryshnikov Arts Center.

By 2014, the Rivini line was being sold in bridal boutiques in the United States.

In 2015, a show of Vinieris' fashions was held on the roof garden of Carnegie Hall.

Vinieris has been honored with many industry awards, including the 2002 New Designer of the Year, 2006 Best Ad Campaign of the Year, and 2007 Best Ad campaign of the Year.
