= Eva Theresa Bradshaw =

Canadian painter (1871–1938)

- Born: 1871; London, Ontario, Canada
- Died: 1938 (aged 66–67)
- Known for: Painting
- Movement: Impressionism

Eva Theresa Bradshaw (1871–1938) was a Canadian painter known for her floral paintings.

== Biography ==
Bradshaw was born in 1871 in London, Ontario.

She studied art in Canada under John and James Griffiths, and with her mentor Florence Carlyle. She also studied in the United States; in Boston, Philadelphia, and New York. In New York she studied under Robert Henri.

Bradshaw exhibited regularly with the Royal Canadian Academy of Arts from 1902 through 1907. Her paintings were exhibited in the Canadian art section at the 1923 British Empire Exhibition at Wembley, England.

She was a member of the Western Art League for over three decades, serving as treasurer for many years.

Bradshaw died in 1938.

== Legacy ==
In 1941, the London Art Gallery held a retrospective of Bradshaw's work. More than a dozen of her paintings are part of the Museum London collection.

== Gallery ==
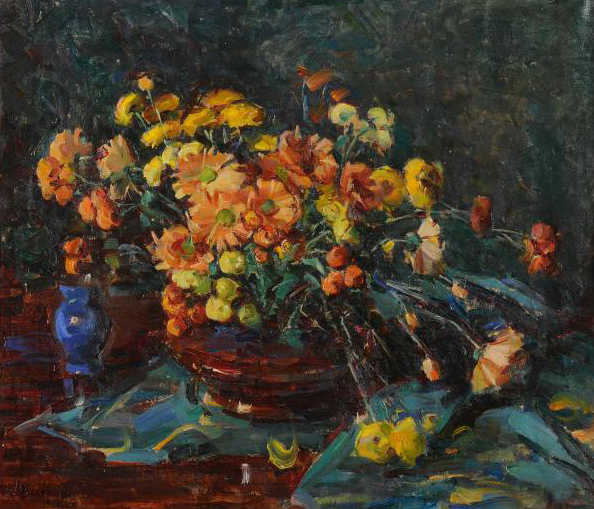
Bowl of Flowers

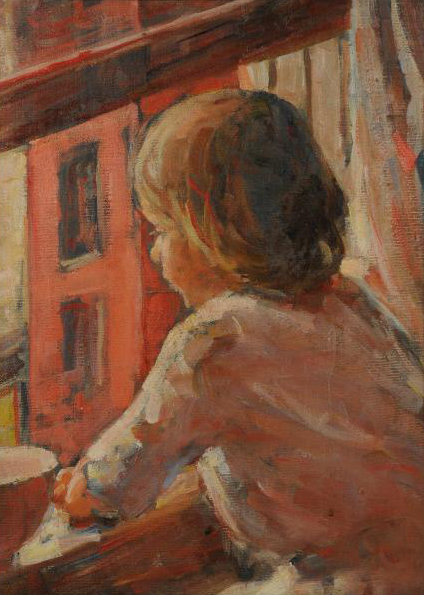
Girl at Window

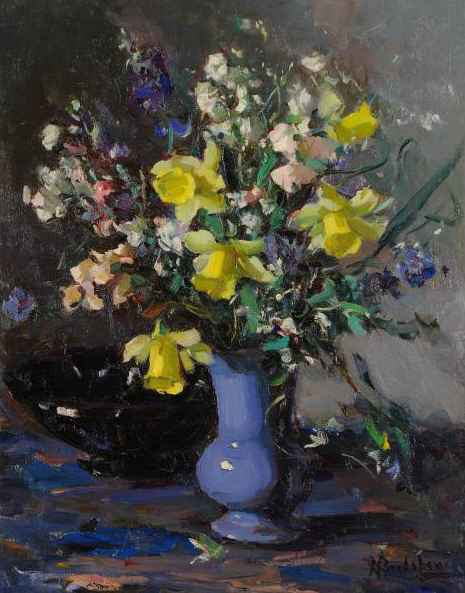
Spring Bouquet
