= Robert Linsley =

Canadian artist, writer and professor

Robert Linsley (1952 – February 2, 2017) was a Canadian artist, writer and professor known for his abstract paintings. He died in Kitchener, Ontario where he had moved in 2002 to teach at the University of Waterloo.

== Early life and education ==
Linsley was born in 1952 in Winnipeg, Manitoba. He received a BFA degree in 1982 and a MFA degree in 1988 from the University of British Columbia.

== Career ==
His book Beyond Resemblance Abstract Art in the Age of Global Conceptualism was published in 2017 by Reaktion Books. Linsley's work is included in the collections of the Vancouver Art Gallery, the Edmonton Art Gallery and the Morris and Helen Belkin Art Gallery at the University of British Columbia.

Linsley died in a bicycle accident in Kitchener-Waterloo, Ontario in 2017.
