= Susan Shantz =

Canadian sculptor

- Born: 1957 (age 68–69); Ontario, Canada

Susan Shantz (born 1957) is a Canadian sculptor. Her work is often described as spiritual and feminist. She currently resides in Saskatoon, Saskatchewan.

Shantz has worked with a variety of sculptural media, including twigs, ash, found objects, tomato paste, and 3D printed thermoplastic prints. Photographs of her selected works are available at the CCCA Canadian Art Database.

Themes in her work include dormancy, consumption, patterns of nature and translation.

== Early life and education ==
Shantz has an undergraduate degree in English from Goshen College, a Master of Arts degree in Religion and Culture from Wilfrid Laurier University, and a Master of Arts degree in Sculpture and Interdisciplinary Studies from York University.

== Career ==
Shantz taught at both York University and Wilfrid Laurier University in Ontario and held a number of solo exhibits. She moved to Saskatoon in 1990 to work at the University of Saskatchewan, where she continued to exhibit. In 1996 she took part in an outdoor sculpture project at the Southern Alberta Art Gallery.

Shantz is a Professor in Sculpture and Extended Media at the University of Saskatchewan and she was the Department Head of Art and Art History from 2007 to 2013.

Shantz has received grants from the Canada Council, the Saskatchewan Arts Board, the British Columbia Arts Council and the Ontario Arts Council.

She has also written on the topics of spirituality in art and quilt-making.

== Artistic innovation ==
Shantz's commitment to pushing the boundaries of artistic expression is evident in her innovative techniques and exploration of diverse mediums. She consistently challenged conventional norms, inspiring future generations of artists to think outside traditional artistic constraints.

== Educational contribution ==
In addition to her artistic achievements, Shantz made notable contributions to the field of art education. She shared her expertise and passion with aspiring artists. Many of her students have gone on to make significant contributions to the art world themselves.

== Exhibition and recognition ==
Shantz's legacy is further solidified by her extensive exhibition history and the recognition she received during her career. Her works have been showcased in prominent galleries and museums, contributing to the broader discourse on contemporary art. Awards and honors bestowed upon Shantz underscore the impact of her artistic contributions and the esteem in which she is held by peers and critics alike.

=== Artworks ===
Polytypes

Remediation

Third Space

Hibernaculum (1994)

Satiate (1998)

Untitled (Canapoy Room, 2006–2007)
