= Alicia Popoff =

Canadian painter (1950–2015)

Alicia Dawn Popoff (1950 – March 9, 2015) was a Canadian abstract painter who worked primarily in acrylic and sometimes mixed media. She also worked in sculpture, sometimes collaborating with her husband and fellow artist and sculptor Leslie Potter. Popoff's work has been exhibited across Canada in numerous exhibitions and commercial galleries and can be seen in public and corporate collections.

== Early life, education and work ==
Alicia Popoff was born in 1950 in Saskatoon, Saskatchewan. She studied art at the University of Saskatchewan, Saskatoon, receiving her Bachelor of Fine Arts in 1979 and her Master of Fine Arts in 1984. She originally planned to study political science and sociology, but quickly fell in love with art and the process of being an artist. She later worked at the University of Saskatchewan as a lecturer in the Department of Art and Art History as well as teaching children's and adult art classes.

== Practice ==
Popoff's work is influenced by the prairie landscape and the works of surrealist artists Paul Klee and Joan Miró, among others. She has likened her work to a meditation of the world around her "…from the tiniest particle unseen, to the impressive and infinite sky. My work is constructed from sounds such as the birds and the wind, tastes and smells like the crisp winter air".

Popoff died on March 9, 2015, at her home in Saskatoon. She was diagnosed with multiple myeloma five years before.

== Solo exhibitions ==
- 2008 Ken Segal Gallery, Winnipeg, Prairie Meditation
- 2006 Art Gallery of Regina, Essence and Flow
- 2006 Art Placement, Saskatoon, Time Within
- 2005 Ken Segal Gallery, Winnipeg, Spark
- 2000 Upstairs Gallery, Winnipeg, Lost In The Garden, Part 2
- 1999–2000 Mendel Art Gallery, Saskatchewan tour, Lost In The Garden
- 1998 Mendel Art Gallery, Saskatoon, Lost In The Garden
- 1997 Upstairs Gallery, Winnipeg, Voyages
- 1995 Galerie Rochon, Toronto, Spirit Garden Revisited
- 1994 Gallery 1C03, University of Winnipeg, Spirit Garden
- 1994 Upstairs Gallery, Winnipeg, Spirit Garden
- 1994 Artworks, Saskatoon, Travelling To Birdland
- 1993 Galerie Rochon, Toronto, New Urban Village, Part 2
- 1992 Artworks, Saskatoon, Monsters In My Teacup
- 1991 AKA Gallery, Saskatoon, Modern Myths: Lovers & Transitions
- 1991 Thomas Gallery, Winnipeg, We Were All Martians Once
- 1990 Dufferin Gallery, Saskatoon, In Fugal Time: Vultures On The Rock
- 1989 Thomas Gallery, Winnipeg, Bird Creatures and Other Travelling Objects
- 1987 Mendel Art Gallery, Saskatoon, Passages: Theme With Variations
