= Lois Andison =

Canadian installation artist

Lois Andison is an installation artist whose mixed materials installations explore intersections of technology, geography and the body. She currently teaches sculpture and digital media at the University of Waterloo.

== Biography ==
Andison was born in Smith Falls, Ontario and now resides in Toronto, Ontario. Previous to her artistic career, Andison worked as a professional illustrator and graphic designer. She received her Bachelor of Fine Arts from York University in 1990. Since graduation she has worked as a professional artist, with her first solo exhibition hosted by Gallery Seventy-Six in Toronto, Ontario. Her works have also been exhibited outside the formal gallery system. In 2019, her work tree of life was exhibited at BMO Project Room in Toronto.

== Collections ==
Andison's work is included in the collection of the National Gallery of Canada.
