= Josie Pamiutu Papialuk =

Canadian Inuk artist (1918-1996)

- Born: 1918; Issuksiuvit Lake area of Quebec
- Died: 1996 (aged 77–78)

Josie Pamiutu Papialuk (surname variously spelled as Papialook and Paperk) (1918–1996) was an Inuk artist who lived in Puvirnituq, Quebec.

== Early life ==
He was born in the Issuksiuvit Lake area of Quebec.

== Career ==
He worked in printmaking (including in the Povungnituk print shop), and sculpted as well.

His work is held in a variety of museums, including the National Gallery of Canada, the British Museum, the University of Michigan Museum of Art, the Canadian Museum of History, the Musée national des beaux-arts du Québec, the Montreal Museum of Fine Arts, and the McMaster Museum of Art.
