= Rita Winkler (artist) =

Canadian artist

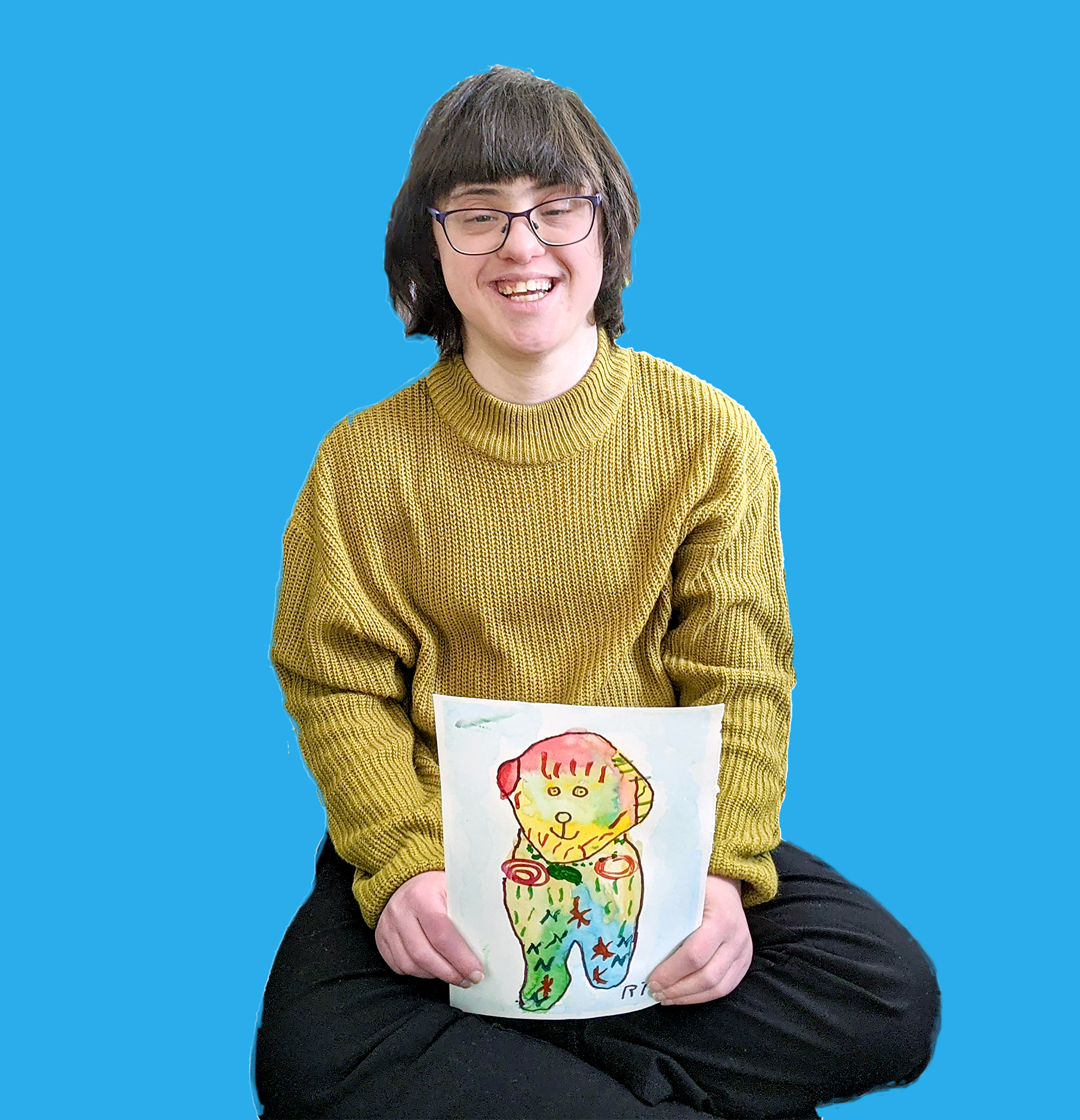
- Born: Rita Winkler; 1987 (age 38–39); Calgary, Alberta, Canada
- Education: Drewry Secondary School
- Known for: Watercolor paintings
- Notable work: My Art, My World
- Website: ritawinkler.art

Rita Winkler (born 1987) is a Canadian artist who is known for her paintings and artbook, My Art, My World.

== Biography ==
Winkler was born in 1987 with Down syndrome in Calgary, Alberta. She attended Drewry Secondary School where she learnt sign language. Later, she went to DANI, an organization which helps people with disabilities, where she participated in their stage productions and wrote their newsletters. At DANI, she discovered her passion for art.

After the death of her father due to cancer in 2002, her family moved to Toronto, Ontario in 2003. There, Winkler began a life that included folk dancing, yoga, signing, and painting.

During the pandemic, she took classes at L'Arche London and learnt watercolor painting.

In 2021, a publishing company approached her family, and with the help of her mother, Helen Winkler, and her uncle, Mark Winkler, from New York, they co-authored an educational picture book entitled, My Art, My World. The book shows how she views her life through paintings and teaches inclusion. The book received positive reviews, including a star in Kirkus Reviews.

Winkler is also a member of the Ontario Folk Dance Association.

== Bibliography ==
- Winkler, Rita; Winkler, Helen; Winkler, Mark (2021). My Art, My World
- Winkler, Mark; Winkler, Rita (2025). Color Outside the Lines: An Animal Coloring Book for Ages 4-9, Celebrating Imagination, Creativity, and the Joy of Seeing the World in Your Own Way. (Illustrations by Rita Winkler). Rainbow Pages Press. ISBN 9798218856489.
