= Statira Elizabeth Frame =

Canadian painter

- Born: Statira Elizabeth Wells; September 15, 1858; Granby, Canada East
- Died: November 29, 1935 (aged 77); Vancouver, Canada
- Known for: Painter
- Movement: Modernism
- Spouse: William Frame

Statira Elizabeth Frame (15 September 1858 – 29 November 1935) was a Canadian painter, known for her innovative use of colour.

== Biography ==
Statira Elizabeth Wells was born in 1858 in Granby, Canada East. She moved to Vancouver after her marriage to William Frame, a bookkeeper for the Hastings Saw Mill Store in Vancouver.

Frame attended some art classes at Vancouver Night School. In 1909, she began to exhibit her work with the Studio Club. Frame was an acquaintance of Emily Carr and was introduce to Post-impressionistic concepts by Carr in 1912.

In 1918, Frame submitted some canvases to the American Ashcan School's Robert Henri for review. She received encouraging feedback from Henri, particularly regarding her use of colour. Shortly thereafter Frame traveled to California for several months to study with the American Impressionist Armin Hansen.

In the 1920s, Frame exhibited her work at the British Columbia Society of Fine Arts and the Vancouver Sketch Club. Frame became a prominent figure in the Vancouver art scene, particularly at the newly formed Palette and Chisel Club. She continued to exhibit in the Vancouver area in the 1930s.

Frame died in 1935 in Vancouver.

A posthumous exhibition of her work was held at Vancouver Art Gallery in April 1936. Some of her work is held at the BC Archives.
