= Thomassie Kudluk =

Thomassie Kudluk (1910 – 1989) was an Inuk artist from Kangiqsuk (now Kangirsuk), Nunavik, in northern Quebec, Canada. Known for his evocative sculptures and drawings, Kudluk documented the cultural and social transition of Inuit from traditional nomadic life to a settled way of living under increasing southern influence.

== Personal life ==
Thomassie Kudluk was born in 1910 on the Ungava Peninsula in northern Quebec. He died in 1989.

== Career ==
Kudluk used both visual art and narrative to portray Inuit life, especially the shifts brought about by colonization and modernization. His work includes more than 1,200 illustrations as well as numerous sculptures, which reflect his lived experience as a hunter and community member. His grandson has described him as humorous, creative, and deeply observant of the changing world around him.

== Techniques and themes ==
Kudluk worked primarily in sculpture and drawing, using materials such as serpentine and soapstone. His sculptures often depicted traditional Inuit life—igloos, hunting tools, and oral legends—alongside modern imagery such as weather stations, firearms, and prefabricated houses. Some of his sculptures included inscriptions in Inuktitut, adding folkloric and narrative layers.

Kudluk's work is notable for its first-hand Inuit perspective, offering a counterpoint to the interpretations of southern researchers, missionaries, and traders.

== Major exhibitions ==
Kudluk's work has been featured in numerous exhibitions across Canada and internationally, including:

- Arctic Forms - Inuit Sculpture, at Arctic Inuit Art Gallery, date unspecified
- Building on Strengths: New Inuit Art from the Collection, at Winnipeg Art Gallery, 2006
- Demons and Spirits and Those Who Wrestled with Them, at The Arctic Circle, 1979
- Inuit Art in the 1970s, at Department of Indian Affairs and Northern Development, and the Agnes Etherington Art Centre, 1979
- The Eccentric Art of Thomassie Kudluk from Payne Bay, at The Innuit Gallery of Eskimo Art, 1981
- In the Shadow of the Sun: Contemporary Indian and Inuit Art in Canada, Canadian Museum of Civilization, 1993

== Public collections ==
Thomassie Kudluk's work is held in several public museum collections, including:

- Art Gallery of Ontario, Toronto
- Avataq Cultural Institute, Montreal
- Canadian Museum of History (formerly Canadian Museum of Civilization), Gatineau
- National Gallery of Canada, Ottawa
- Winnipeg Art Gallery, Winnipeg

== Museums collections ==
His works are part of several prestigious collections, including the Marion Scott Gallery, the Inuit Art Foundation, the Art Gallery of Ontario, the Avataq Cultural Institute, and the Canadian Museum of Civilization.
