= Christine Laptuta =

Canadian artist (born 1951)

Christine Laptuta (born 1951) is a Canadian artist who lives and works in Victoria, B.C. Canada

Her work is included in the collections of the National Gallery of Canada, the Museum of Fine Arts Houston and the Portland Art Museum.
