= Elisabeth Margaret Hopkins =

Canadian artist and author (1894-1991)

Elizabeth Hopkins
- Born: Elizabeth Margaret Hopkins; April 22, 1894; Fort Gilkicker, England
- Died: April 1991; Saltspring Island, British Columbia
- Known for: Watercolour painting, illustration

Elisabeth Margaret Hopkins (April 22, 1894 – April 1991), born in Fort Gilkicker, Hampshire, England, was a painter and writer in British Columbia.

== Career ==
Elisabeth Hopkins, a cousin of Gerard Manley Hopkins and the granddaughter of the painter Frances Ann Hopkins. began painting during her childhood. Trained as a nurse at Middlesex Hospital in 1916, she saw service in the World War II and in Canada, to which she moved in 1954, at a nursing home in Victoria, British Columbia, then at Victoria Veterans' Hospital. Afterwards, she ran an Anglican bookshop. She retired to Galiano Island where she joined the Galiano Painters Guild and afterwards moved to Saltspring Island.

In the 1970s and 1980s, her watercolour paintings created from her imaginary world were exhibited at the Bau Xi Galleries in Vancouver and Toronto. She illustrated and wrote a children's book, The Painted Cougar, published by Talon Books in 1977, which tells the story of Leon, a cougar in love with another cougar named Lurline. In 1982, an exhibition titled The magical world of Elisabeth Hopkins was curated by Joan Stebbins for the Southern Alberta Art Gallery in Lethbridge. She was the subject of a film made by Colin Browne for the National Film Board of Canada in 1984 titled Hoppy: A Portrait of Elisabeth Hopkins (Hoppy was her nickname to local residents in BC). The Elisabeth Margaret Hopkins fonds is in the University of British Columbia Library Rare Books and Special Collections.
