= Kartz Ucci =

American contemporary artist

- Born: 1961
- Died: 2013 (aged 51–52)
- Education: York University
- Known for: Contemporary artist

Kartz Ucci (1961 – 2013) was a multidisciplinary contemporary artist and educator working with sculpture, installation, text, and expanded media.

== Early life and education ==
Kartz Ucci earned a BFA and an MFA, as well as an MA in Interdisciplinary Studies from York University in Toronto. After teaching at York University, McMaster University and Ryerson University (now Toronto Metropolitan University) in Canada, she joined the University of Oregon faculty in 2004 and was tenured in 2010.

== Critical reception ==
Greg Kook-Anderson said Ucci was "a digital artist who worked in text, neon, vinyl and film...In her work, Ucci would translate sound into color. She was deeply interested in the ideas of synesthesia -- the sensory disorder in which perception in one sense evokes an involuntary response in another."

The Toronto National Post review said of Ucci's 203 installation, "Sad But True centres on a vinyl LP recording of 368 songs that have the word 'sad' in their titles, which she has layered into one stream of sound. Each song begins at the same time, so the sound that fills the gallery... is a lot of nerve-crunching noise." The review also said, "This is hardly an exhibition you want to hang around in. It's a stressful and impersonal space, even with the hint of playful commentary on the inexhaustible supply of sad songs. It's a lot better to think about this show than to experience it."

Jeff Jahn wrote that she was "one of Oregon's biggest proponents of new media pioneers". Edward P. Clapp said, "Ucci is an installation artist working with relationships of theory, material, and concept within an expanded field of visual exploitation." E. Lamb said Ucci's "Twenty Love Poems and a Song of Despair" as a "project based video and sound installation, a non-sales form, becoming increasingly significant in contemporary art practice".

== Exhibitions ==
- Sad But True, Red Head Gallery, Toronto, 2003.
- Twenty Love Poems and a Song of Despair, Tilt Export, Helzer Gallery, Portland, 2009.
- An Opera of One, in "The Long Now", University of Oregon, 2012.
- 256 Shades of Grey, High Desert Test Sites 2013, Joshua Tree, California, 2013.

== See also ==
- Conceptual art
- Sound installation
