= Magda Szabo =

Canadian miniaturist

Magda Szabo (July 8, 1934 – August 17, 2024) was a Canadian miniaturist.

== Early life ==
Magda Szabo was born in Budapest, Hungary. She started painting early, using oil as her medium, on large canvas.

== Career ==
Her miniature painting career started in the late eighties. She selected watercolor for this genre for technical reasons. Much of her work from that period consisted of creations, which were hardly bigger than a large postage stamp. To paint such tiny pictures, she used a magnifying glass and a brush, which consisted of three hairs. Her later works were larger, around 5" by 3.5" or smaller in size, but still classifiable as miniatures.

Magda Szabo used a special varnish to coat the surfaces of her paintings. This varnish protects the colors from fading and provides a unique illumination effect.

She had been a member of a number of Miniature Art Societies, such as the Hilliard Society of Miniaturists, The Miniature Art Society of Florida US and Canadian Society of Painters, Sculptors and Gravers in Ottawa, Canada. She had permanent exhibitions in a number of galleries in Maui, Hawaii. Her miniatures had been sold in countries, such as England, US, Canada and others. Her output comprises over one thousand miniatures of many different themes.

== Awards ==
Magda Szabo received several prizes in international and national juried competitions for her work, amongst others:

- First prize: 1997, Seaside Art Gallery, Nags Head, North Carolina (international)
- Second prize: 2000, Florida Miniature Art Society, (international)
- Four Awards of Excellence: Chambersburg, Pennsylvania, (international)
