= Danièle Rochon =

- Born: April 8, 1946 (age 79); Ottawa, Ontario
- Known for: Painter, Graphic artist
- Awards: Royal Canadian Academy of Arts

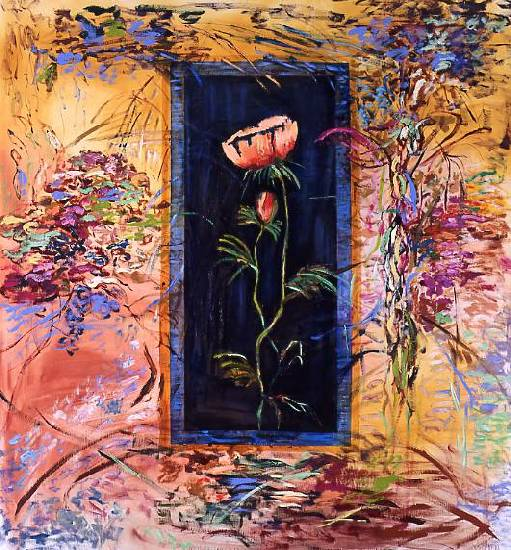
Rochon, La rosée bleue, 2002, oil on canvas

Danièle Rochon RCA (born April 8, 1946) is a Quebec painter. In 1992, she was elected a member of the Royal Canadian Academy of Arts.

== Biography ==
Rochon was born in Ottawa, Ontario. After achieving a baccalaureate of arts degree from Laval University in Quebec City, she continued her studies in Political Science at Laval and Montreal Universities in Quebec. She then started to work in creative advertising and in translation for several years.

In 1975, Rochon took courses at the Montreal Museum of Fine Arts school and at the Saidye Bronfman's college of art. She also studied engraving for two years at the Graff studio in Montreal. She subsequently spent seven years continuing her artistic research selecting pastels and oil as her principal mediums of expression.

From 1982, she began to exhibit her work in Canada and in the United States, particularly in New York and San Francisco.

In 1987, Danièle Rochon undertook the making of numerous lithographies at the studios of Pierre Chave and Bjorn Hansen in Vence in the south of France. She made a series of lithographies for the art book "La Nuit" of Claire Dé, a limited edition, published by Art Global.

In 1990, she created a vast painting of 23 m x 6 m on a vaulted ceiling, entitled "Hymne à la vie" in Quebec City. The same year, she settled in Provence in the south of France where she painted a triptych for the Roman church of Viens in the Luberon. During this period she exhibited her work in Europe, particularly in Paris, Barcelona and Copenhagen. Rochon continues to paint in both her studios in Montreal and in Provence.

In 1992, Rochon participated in an operatic project of Mardi Ellen Hill in New York, "Vaugirard", for which she created the decor and costumes.

Since then, Rochon has shown her work in more than forty exhibitions in various countries.

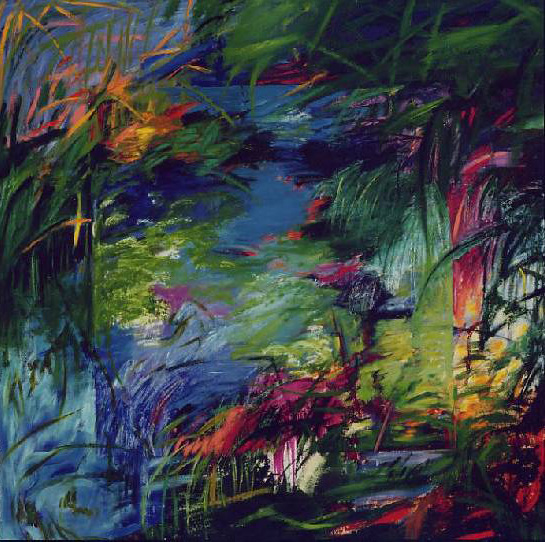
Rochon, Arcadia, 1991, oil on canvas

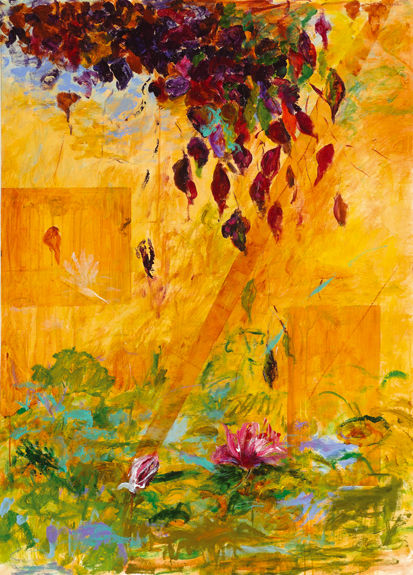
Rochon, Thrusting Out, 2008, acrylic on canvas

== See also ==
- Royal Canadian Academy of Arts
