= Imona Natsiapik =

Inuk artist

- Born: 1966 (age 59–60); Clyde River, Nunavut

Imona Natsiapik (born 1966 in Clyde River, Nunavut) is an Inuk artist.

Natsiapik was one of 50 artists to participate in the Inuit Art Foundation's inaugural Arts Alive event in 2004. Her work is included in the collections of the National Gallery of Canada and the McMichael Canadian Art Collection.
