= Mary R. McKie =

Canadian artist

- Known for: Watercolor, Drawing

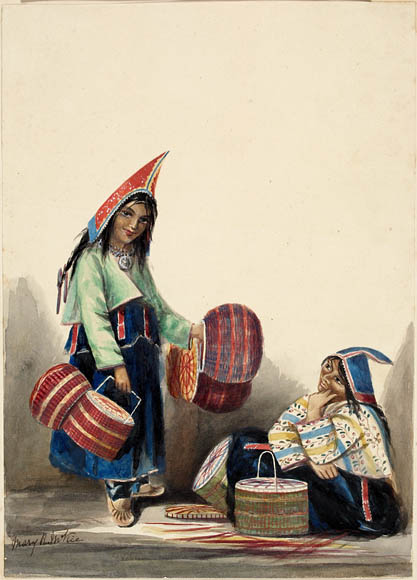
Mary McKie: Mi'Kmaq women selling baskets in Halifax

Mary R. McKie was a Canadian artist known for her watercolor paintings. Based in Halifax, Nova Scotia, McKie was active as an artist from 1840 to 1862.

Her work is included in the collections of the Musée national des beaux-arts du Québec and the National Library and Archives of Canada.
