= Margaret Uyauperq Aniksak =

Inuk artist

- Born: 1907; Northwest Territories, Canada
- Died: 1993 (aged 85–86); Nunavut, Canada
- Known for: stone sculptures

Margaret Uyauperq Aniksak (1907–1993) was an Inuk sculptor who lived in Arviat, Nunavut.

Her work is included in the collections of the National Gallery of Canada and the Winnipeg Art Gallery.
