= E. Louise De Montigny-Giguère =

Canadian civil servant, sculptor, and painter

Elizabeth Louise De Montigny-Giguère (April 28, 1878 – 1969) was a civil servant, sculptor and painter in Quebec.

She was born Elizabeth Louise De Montigny in La Prairie and studied drawing and painting with Les Sœurs du Bon-Pasteur in Montreal. From 1914 to 1917, Montigny-Giguère studied with William Brymner. From 1919 to 1922, she studied sculpture with Alfred Laliberté at the Conseil des arts et manufactures de Montréal. From 1924 to 1925, she studied at the École des beaux-arts de Montréal. She exhibited at the salon of the Art Association of Montreal (later the Montreal Museum of Fine Arts) from 1921 to 1934 and the Royal Canadian Academy of Arts from 1920 to 1935.

Her sculptures included religious works and portraits of politicians; her paintings mostly had floral themes.
