= Kina Reusch =

Canadian artist

- Kina Reusch in 1976
- Born: December 13, 1940; Montreal, Quebec, Canada
- Died: 1988
- Known for: weaving and textile art; monumental sculpture
- Notable work: Torii

Kina Reusch (1940–1988) was a Canadian artist based in Montreal, Quebec.

== Early life and education ==
Reusch was born in Montreal on December 13, 1940, to parents who were both artists. She is primarily a self-taught artist, however she took classes at the Central Technical School in Toronto, at the Montreal Museum of Fine Arts School of Art, and at the Ontario College of Art.

== Work ==
Reusch's career as an artist and sculptor began in earnest in 1972. She is mainly known for her weavings and tapestries; she also produced large scale sculptures and paintings.

Her work has been included in several exhibitions. She received grants and awards for her work from the Quebec's Ministère des Affaires culturelles and the Canada Council of the Arts.

Her work Torii was part of the Corridart exhibition during the 1976 Montreal Olympics, which was unexpectedly taken down after six days by the City of Montreal. In 1977 Reusch was hired as the director of Montreal's Galerie Powerhouse, a presentation centre dedicated to art made by women.

A video on her work, titled Kina Reusch:The New Penelope was produced by the Canadian Broadcasting Corporation.

== Collections ==
Her work is included in the collections of the National Gallery of Canada and the Musée national des beaux-arts du Québec. Her personal papers are held in the library of Concordia University, Montreal. The Art Bank of the Canada Council holds her work in their collection, as does the Collection Prêt d'oeuvres d'art du Musée du Québec.
