= Sarah Jean Munro Maclean =

Canadian painter

- Born: Sarah Jean Munro; 1873; Pictou, Nova Scotia Canada
- Died: February 21, 1952 (aged 78–79); Montreal, Canada
- Known for: Painter
- Spouse: Lachlan A. MacLean

Sarah Jean Munro Maclean (1873 – 1952), was a Canadian painter known for her landscapes and portraits.

== Biography ==
Sarah Jean Munro was born in Pictou, Nova Scotia, in 1873.

She first studied art in Boston, Massachusetts, then in England at Heatherley School of Fine Art in London and the Liverpool School of Art where she received her teaching diploma.

After graduation Maclean returned to Canada. She married Rev. Lachlan A. MacLean and settled in Montreal. There she joined the Women's Art Association of Canada and the Art Association of Montreal.

In 1921, the National Gallery of Canada purchased Maclean's old painting Old Court Yard, St. Vincent, Montreal for their collection.

Maclean organized sketching and studio classes for the Art Association of Montreal. Her paintings were included in several the Association's Annual Spring Exhibitions from 1920 through 1936. She also exhibited at the Royal Canadian Academy of Arts Annual Exhibition in 1931.

While Maclean participated in the art scene in Montreal, she was also active in parish life, working with the Canadian Presbyterian and United Church women's groups, and serving as chairperson of the Girl’s Work Board of the Religious Education Association.

She died in Montreal on February 21, 1952.
