= Valérie Kolakis =

Canadian artist

Valerie Kolakis (born 1966) is a Canadian sculptor and installation artist. Her work is included in the collections of the Musée d'art contemporain de Montréal and the Musée national des beaux-arts du Québec.
