= Cecil Youngfox =

Cecil Youngfox (1942–1987) was an Ojibwa artist.

== Life ==
He was born in Blind River, Ontario in 1942 to Ojibway and Metis parents. He devoted all his life to the study of all indigenous people of Canada and tried to break stereotypes and to spread their culture worldwide. All his creative work is a mixture of his Metis heritage and Christian upbringing. By the time of his early death in 1987 he succeeded a lot in popularising of indigenous culture and was recognised as one of the leading artists of Canada.

He was a named member of the Aboriginal Order of Canada for his work to encourage First Nations youth.

== His selected works ==
- Lovers in the Spring.
- Joyous Motherhood. Art Print.
- Returning Home. Art Print.
- Winter Walk. Art Print.
- Winter Dancers. Silk Oblong Scarf, 1978.
- A Canoe Thanksgiving
- The Drum Singer
- The Drum Dancer
