= Taslim Samji =

Canadian artist

Taslim Samji is a Canadian interdisciplinary artist, writer and curator based in Burnaby, British Columbia.

== Life and education ==
Born in Tanzania, Taslim Samji immigrated to Canada at a young age and now lives and works in Burnaby, Canada. She was educated at the University of British Columbia (Bachelor of Arts, Asian Studies), British Columbia Institute of Technology (marketing diploma) and Emily Carr University of Art and Design (Fine Arts Certificate program).

Taslim has stated that her early life was shaped by the traditional cultural expectations of her South Asian family. She has cited the pressures of the immigrant experience and familial protective instincts as early influences on her creative development.

== Exhibitions ==
As an artist, Samji has participated in exhibitions, including Change – Contemporary Ismaili Muslim Art, held at the Surrey Art Gallery in 2014 and Kaleidoscope Fest in 2016.

As a curator, she is known for bridging cultural barriers among Ismaili Muslims and highlighting the work of women artists. Samji curated Discovery: A Slice of Diversity at the Deer Lake Gallery (Burnaby Arts Council) in 2014, featuring the work of Canadian Ismaili Muslim artists with origins in East Africa. In November–December 2015, she curated Odyssey: Past Meets Present at the Roundhouse Community Arts and Recreation Centre in the Yaletown neighbourhood of Vancouver, in which 15 artists with geographically diverse backgrounds were invited to contribute artworks exploring how their past experiences influence their current work. The exhibition "Commonality" which was held at the Newton Cultural Centre in January 2016, illustrated the common ground among nine female Ismaili Muslim artists from East Africa, India and Pakistan.

== Publications ==
- Kampala to Canada - The work presents the narratives of twelve Ugandan Asian Canadians, utilizing art to explore the history and social impact of their immigration. / Published on April 20, 2023 / ISBN 978-1738899814
- Undervalued: Brown Girls’ Guide to Finding Your Worth - A memoir that explores themes of identity, self-worth, and generational healing. The book focuses on the experiences of women of color, specifically regarding cultural conditioning and the expectations within immigrant families. / Published on July 13, 2025 / ISBN 978-1738899821

== Writing reference ==
Samji, Taslim (January 2016). "Women in Art". Spotlight on the Visual Arts: 11.

== Awards ==
Women of the Decade in Arts and Leadership - 2017 - presented by the Women Economic Forum
