= Gwendolyn Mews =

Canadian-born artist

- Born: Gwendolyn Dufill Mews; 1893; St. John's, Newfoundland, Canada
- Died: 1973 (aged 79–80); Boulder, Colorado
- Known for: Painting
- Spouse: A. Gayle Waldrop (m. 1925)

Gwendolyn Dufill Mews (1893 – 1973) was a Canadian-born artist who later settled in the United States.

== Life ==
The daughter of Arthur Mews (or Meux), deputy colonial secretary, and Mabel Woods, she was born in St. John's, Newfoundland. She studied at Mount Allison Ladies' College and went on to teach at the college from 1920 to 1922. During this time, she exhibited with the Art Association of Montreal. She later studied with Charles Webster Hawthorne in Provincetown, Massachusetts and with Kimon Nicolaïdes at the Art Students League in New York City. From 1922 to 1925, she was assistant professor of fine arts at the University of Oklahoma at Norman. During this period, she studied with artists Jozef Bakos and Frank Applegate from Santa Fe, New Mexico.

In 1925, she married A. Gayle Waldrop, an assistant professor of journalism at the University of Colorado. The couple settled in Boulder, Colorado. She was hired as an art instructor by the University of Colorado.

Mews was a charter member of the Boulder Artists Guild and later served as its president. In 1931, with other members of the University of Colorado fine arts faculty, she joined The Prospectors, a regional art collective. Mews worked in oil, watercolor, ink and lithography. She produced landscapes based on Colorado scenery and also portraits. She received silver medals from the Kansas City Art Institute in 1923 and 1929.

She died at home in Boulder.

== Legacy ==
Her paintings appeared in exhibitions held at the Denver Art Museum, the University of Oklahoma and the University of Kansas. Her work was included in an exhibition held at the University of Denver art gallery in 2016.
