= Caroline Dukes =

Canadian artist (1929–2003)

- Born: May 19, 1929; Ujpest, Hungary
- Died: June 8, 2003 (aged 74); Winnipeg, Manitoba, Canada
- Education: Studio of sculptor, Zsigmond Kisfaludi Strobl and the Academy of Fine Arts in Budapest (Hungarian University of Fine Arts) (1951). She resumed her studies at the School of Art, University of Manitoba (graduated 1972)
- Notable work: Remember . . . Relate . . . Retell
- Spouse: Alfred Dukes
- Elected: Member, the Royal Canadian Academy of Arts (1994)

Caroline Dukes RCA (May 19, 1929 – June 8, 2003) was a painter and installation artist, born in Hungary but moved to Winnipeg, Manitoba in 1967. Today, she is considered a Manitoba artist.

== Career ==
Dukes was born in Ujpest, Hungary and apprenticed with sculptor, Zsigmond Kisfaludi Strobl in 1948 while taking night classes at the Free University. In 1952, she enrolled at the Academy of Fine Arts in Budapest (Hungarian University of Fine Arts). In 1958, after a defeat of the Hungarian uprising against communism (1956), her family immigrated to Toronto. She moved to Winnipeg in 1967 and resumed her studies at the School of Art, University of Manitoba in 1968, studying with Ivan Eyre, and graduating in 1972.

Dukes' paintings were influenced by her experiences as a holocaust survivor and as a witness to communist cruelty in Hungary. Her paintings were organized in series: Nudes (early 1970s); Interiors; Landscapes; At the Focus of Forces (1989); Buildings (1991) (shown at Budapest's Vasarely Múzeum (1993)); and Cities (1998). She created her most moving work Remember...Relate...Retell (multimedia work that included drawings, photographs, text, ready-made objects, video, audio, and constructions) in 1992, undergoing hypnosis to be able to recall memories of her own childhood and connections to her father, whose death when she was four and then recent death of her mother were catalysts in the making of the work. The exhibition was shown at the Robert McLaughlin Gallery, Oshawa, Ontario; MacKenzie Art Gallery, Regina, Saskatchewan; and at Plug In Inc. Gallery, Winnipeg, Manitoba.

Dukes showed her work in exhibitions across Canada and abroad, including group shows in Jerusalem, Munich and Barcelona. Her work is represented in major collections world-wide including the Budapest Museum of Fine Art, Montreal Museum of Fine Arts, Canada Council Art Bank, Manitoba Arts Council Art Bank, The Bronfman Collection and the Princess Anne Collection. In 1994, she was elected to the Royal Canadian Academy of Arts.

In 1995, she became a founding member of SITE Gallery, Winnipeg’s first artist-run commercial cooperative exhibition space (1995–2005) and in April 2003, two months before her death of cancer, she completed an autobiographical work called Circus. She died in Winnipeg on June 8, 2003.

== Legacy ==
In 2003, the Manitoba Artists for Women Art established the Caroline Dukes Legacy Fund which is administered by the Winnipeg Foundation. She was honoured posthumously with a 2008 solo retrospective titled Caroline Dukes: concealed memories at the Winnipeg Art Gallery with a catalogue by Elizabeth Legge. In 2016, the University of Manitoba School of Art had a Dukes show titled Caroline Dukes: Being There.

== Bibliography ==
- Legge, Elizabeth (2008). Caroline Dukes: concealed memories. Winnipeg: Winnipeg Art Gallery.
