= Françoise Labbé =

Françoise Labbé CQ (1933–2001) was an artist and arts administrator born in Baie-Saint-Paul, Québec.

She earned a diploma from the École des beaux-arts de Québec in 1955, and studied printmaking with S.W. Hayter in Paris.

Labbé founded the Musée d'art contemporain de Baie-Saint-Paul (formerly Centre d'exposition de Baie-Saint-Paul) in 1979, and acted as General Director until her death in 2001.

== Honours ==
- 1993 – Médaille de l'assemblée nationale for her contribution to the development of the arts in Baie-Saint-Paul
- 1997 – Knight of the National Order of Quebec
