= Jay Battle =

Canadian-British sculptor

Jason Battle (also known as Jay Battle), ARBS (born 1966) is a sculptor known for his work at Salisbury Cathedral.

Battle was the head stone-carver for the west front of Salisbury Cathedral. He now lives and works in Salisbury.

Included in his figurative work are the series of new statues he sculpted for the West Front of Salisbury Cathedral which were created between 1998 and 2008. These figures are the largest set of statues from one sculptor to be added to the cathedral's West Front since James Redfern in the 19th century.

His abstract sculpture, Pendant Line, has been shown inside Salisbury Cathedral in the exhibition, 'Liminality', in 2010.

He is represented by Adam Gallery and is an associate of the Royal British Society of Sculptors.

== Public works ==
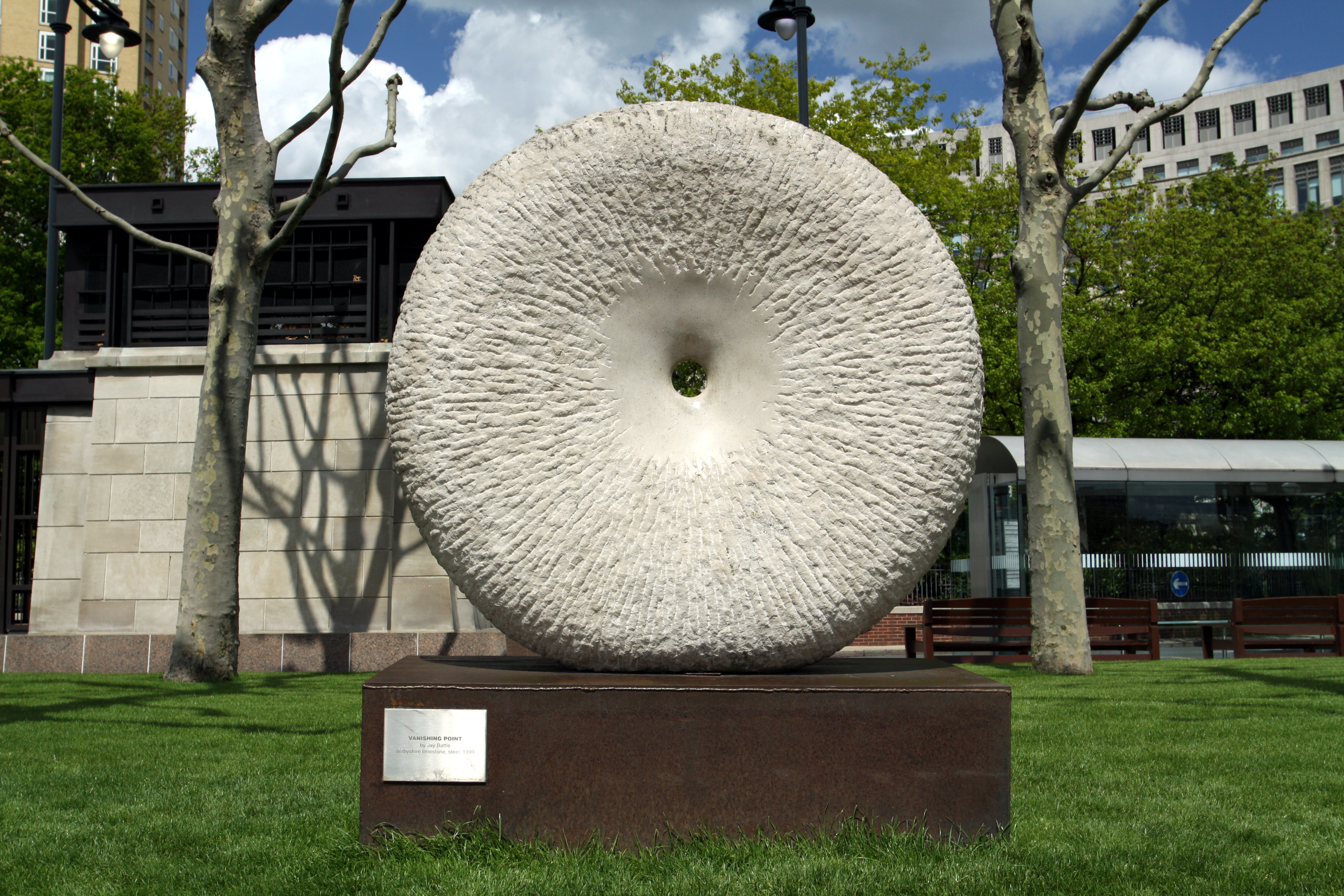
'Vanishing Point'- Canary Wharf, London, United Kingdom

- Vanishing Point, Canary Wharf, London
- 'Standing Divide' – University of Winchester
