= Eliyakota Samualie =

- Born: May 9, 1939; Kinngait, Northwest Territories, Canada
- Died: November 1987 (aged 48)

Eliyakota Samualie (May 9, 1939 – November 1987) was a Canadian Inuk graphic artist and sculptor.

== Early life and education ==
Samualie was born near Cape Dorset. Her father died when she was young, and she was raised by her maternal grandparents.

== Career ==
Samualie began drawing in the 1960s. The imagery in her work frequently included bird forms.

Her work is held in several museums worldwide, including the National Gallery of Canada, the Cape Breton University Art Gallery Collection, the University of Delaware, the Canadian Museum of Civilization, the Art Gallery of Toronto, the Winnipeg Art Gallery, and the University of Michigan Museum of Art.

== Personal life ==
Samualie never married, but raised one adopted child.
