= Marie Khouri =

Canadian sculptor

Marie Khouri is a Canadian sculptor and public artist based in Vancouver. She is known for her large scale sculptures incorporating calligraphic and abstract forms. Her work includes public installations in Canada and internationally.

== Early life and education ==
Khouri was born in Cairo, Egypt, and spent her early life in the Middle East and Europe before settling in Vancouver, Canada. She studied the arts and sculpture in Paris at the École du Louvre.

Before her career as an artist, she worked as a language interpreter and in finance.

== Career ==
Khouri's career in sculpting began after she moved to Vancouver. Her work developed across both sculpture and design, including jewellery and functional objects.

She has over 25 public installations located in Canada and internationally. These works are commonly commissioned by developers for civic spaces, transportation projects, and architectural settings.

== Public art and major works ==
Notable works include:

- I Love (Baheb) – A sculptural installation exhibited at the Vancouver Art Gallery.
- Le Banc – A sculptural bench created for the Vancouver Biennale.
- Histoire d’O – A sculpture installed as part of the Canada Line public art program.

== Artistic style and themes ==
Some of Khouri’s work draws from calligraphy and makes references to language. These sculptural works use flowing shapes that are influenced by Arabic handwriting.

Other works are designed to function as large seating areas and gathering spaces, emphasizing public use.

== Exhibitions ==
Khouri’s work has been presented in exhibitions and in public art galleries in Canada. Her installation I Love was showcased at the Vancouver Art Gallery between 2022 and 2023. It has also been exhibited internationally, including in France and Egypt.

== Awards and honors ==
- BC Achievement Award of Distinction in Applied Art and Design (2023)
- Ordre national du Mérite (Chevalier), France
- Western Living Designer of the Year (Industrial and Fashion categories, 2012)

== Public collections ==
Khouri’s art work can be found in public and institutional collections, including municipal public art programs and transportation authorities in Canada.
