= Mary Tassugat =

Canadian Inuk artist (1918–2016)

- Born: 1918; Clyde River, Northwest Territories, Canada
- Died: 2016 (aged 97–98); Clyde River, Nunavut, Canada

Mary Tassugat was a Canadian Inuk artist whose work was collected in the Musée national des beaux-arts du Québec and National Gallery of Canada before she died in Clyde River, Nunavut.

Works made by Mary Tassugat include drawings and sculptures. Some examples of what she made are drawings of Inuit clothing and a sculpture portraying a polar bear on its hind legs made out of green soapstone.

Tassugat's most expensive sculpture to be sold was her Clyde River Polar Bear. It was sold for $645 USD in 2014 at Walker's Fine Art & Estate Auctioneers.

In 2002 Tassugat was awarded Queen Elizabeth II's Golden Jubilee Medal. Tassugat was also interviewed about changes to the Clyde River area as part of a report on climate change.
