= Lorena Ziraldo =

Italian-born Canadian artist

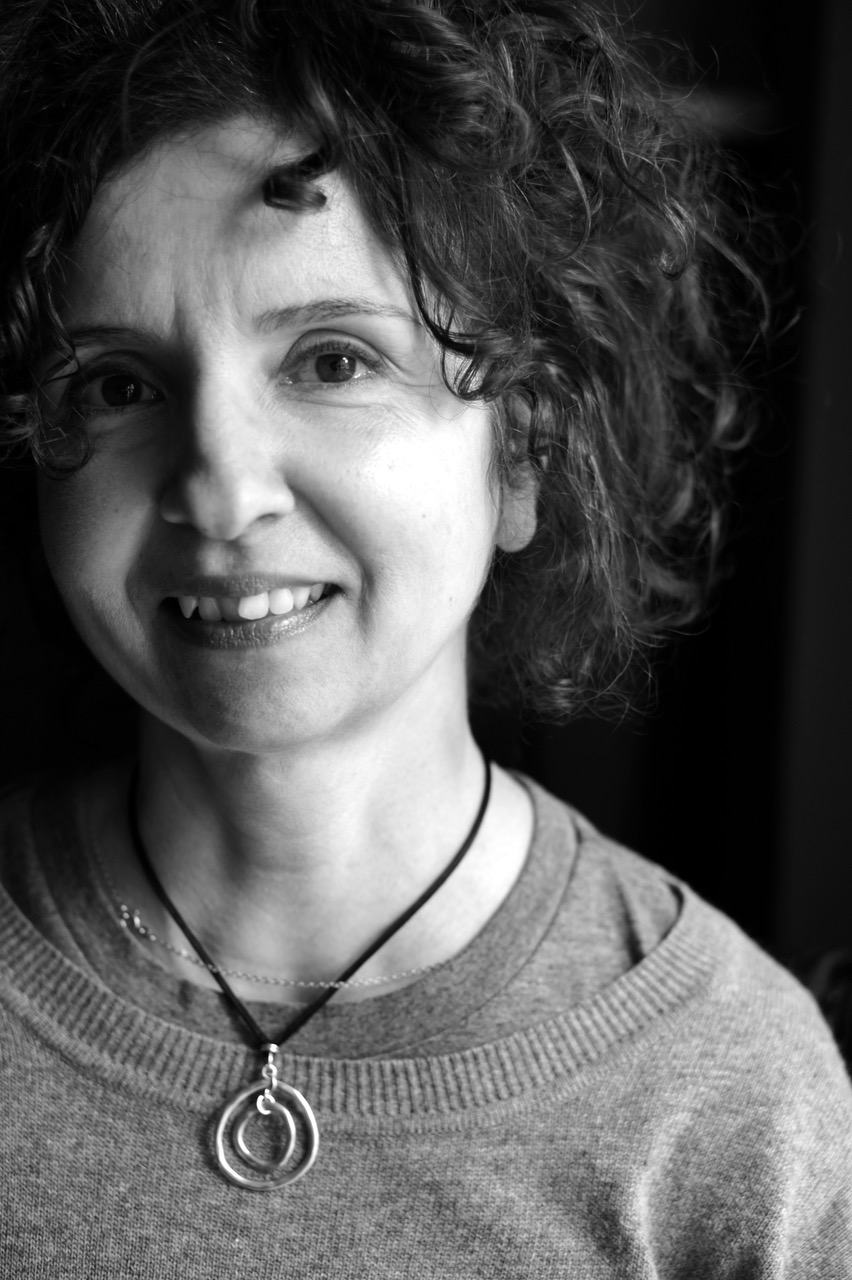
- Ziraldo in 2013
- Born: Udine, Italy
- Occupation: Painter
- Years active: 1980–present

Lorena Ziraldo (born in Italy) is a Canadian artist based in Ottawa, Ontario. She works mainly in oil and employs bold colors in a loose, gestural style.

== Education ==
She studied Art History at the University of Toronto and Fine Arts under Gerald Ferguson at NSCAD University, obtaining her BFA in 2000.

== Work ==
Her paintings have been exhibited in Canada and the USA. Ziraldo's 2014 solo exhibition "National Portrait Gallery" at Wallack Galleries called for the creation of a portrait gallery in the nation's capital.

== Awards ==
- Walker Industries Art Competition, 2019, 2nd Prize
- Figureworks Award Show, 2011, 1st Prize

== Exhibition catalogues ==
- "Intervals", 2025, James Rottman Fine Art, Toronto
- "Beauty In The Time Of ...", 2022, Orange Art Gallery, Ottawa
- "Seventeen Years, 17 Paintings", 2018, Secord Gallery, Halifax
- "Couleur, beauté et quadrillage", 2017, Galerie d’art Blanche, Montreal
- "National Portrait Gallery", 2014, Wallack Galleries, Ottawa
- "Snapshot", 2013, Secord Gallery, Halifax
