= Louise Robert =

Canadian painter (born 1941)

- Born: December 13, 1941 (age 84); Montreal, Quebec, Canada
- Known for: Painter

Louise Robert (born 1941) is a Canadian painter who uses writing in her work.

== Life and work ==
Louise Robert was born in Montreal, Quebec. She is a pharmacist by training and a self-taught artist who paints by delving into the paint of her canvas. Robert incorporates writing into many of her works, a process she continues to explore. Critics say her work shows the influence of surrealistic automatic writing.

Robert had her first solo exhibition in Montreal in 1969. She has been widely exhibited in Canada and internationally since the 1970s. In 1983–1984, her work was shown in a solo show at the Centre Culturel Canadien, Paris and at the Centre Culturel Canadien, Bruxelles. In 2020, her exhibition titled Louise Robert: Painting and Poetry was held at the Musée d'art de Joliette. Her work is included in many group shows and private and public collections, including those of the National Gallery of Canada, the Montreal Museum of Fine Arts, the Musée d'art contemporain de Montréal, the Musée national des beaux-arts du Québec, the Musée d'art contemporain de Baie-Saint-Paul and the Musée d'art de Joliette.

She lives and works in Montreal.

== Notable collections ==
- Nº 78-45, 1981, Musée national des beaux-arts du Québec
