= Ekow Nimako =

Ghanaian Canadian Lego sculptor

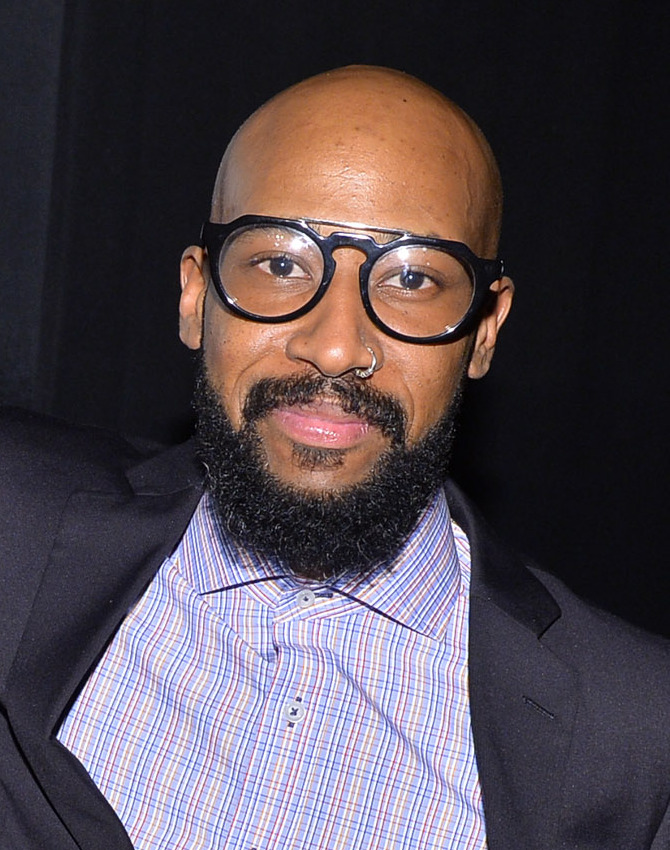
- Ekow Nimako in 2014
- Born: 1979 (age 46–47); Côte-des-Neiges, Canada
- Website: ekownimako.com

Ekow Nimako (born 1979 in Côte-des-Neiges) is a Ghanaian Canadian artist known for creating sculptures out of Lego. His Lego sculptures focus mainly on African culture, history, and futurism. Nimako uses primarily black Lego pieces.

== Career ==
Nimako studied art at York University in Toronto, Canada. In 2014, he received a Canadian grant to showcase his art during the country's Black History Month. His work has since been exhibited internationally. Countries that have exhibited his work include Germany, South Korea, and the UK.

One of his early favorite pieces is a statue titled Flower Girl. The piece was designed to highlight the lost innocence of African girls taken to the West due to the slave trade. Several of Nimako's works are part of a series, such as his Mythos and Amorphia series, which feature mythical creatures and masks, respectively. In 2022, he created a commissioned piece titled The Great Turtle Race.
