= Ron Stonier =

Canadian artist (1933-2001)

- Born: Ronald Milton Stonier; 1933; Victoria, British Columbia
- Died: 2001 (aged 67–68); North Vancouver, British Columbia
- Education: Vancouver School of Art with Jack Shadbolt and Gordon A. Smith (graduated 1957)
- Partner(s): Suzanne Cole (née Hamel) (1968–1987); Sheila Cano (1989–2001)
- Awards: Leon and Thea Koerner Foundation scholarship (1958)

Ron Stonier (1933–2001) was an abstract painter in Vancouver.

== Career ==
Ron Stonier was born in Victoria, British Columbia. He studied at the Provincial Normal School in Victoria, the University of British Columbia and the University of Washington, Seattle, then attended the Vancouver School of Art (VSA), graduating in 1957. Before graduation, he already had a job teaching at the West Vancouver Sketch Club (now the North Shore Artists Guild) and night classes at VSA. After graduation, he spent a year travelling on a Leon and Thea Koerner Foundation scholarship, then worked in the design department of the Canadian Broadcasting Company in Vancouver. From 1962 till 1978, he taught at the VSA full time. During these years, he helped found the Tempus Gallery in Vancouver to show work by faculty and students. He was part of Intermedia as well as helping to found Bau-Xi Gallery in 1965 in Vancouver. From 1978, he concentrated on his painting.

He painted abstractly, creating visceral Tachist works, and, in the 1960s, works that pointed towards post-painterly abstraction. That led to paintings, through the 1970s, with harder edges and a series of colour bands and targets, works that make the most sense when considered in a larger, national context. His oeuvre, which only came to light in 2010, is considered "monumental".

== Exhibitions ==
In the 1960s and 1970s, he often showed his work in group shows in the Vancouver Art Gallery. His last show there in the seventies was titled Current Pursuits, explorations and expressions by nine contemporary B.C. Artists in 1976. In 1995, he was in a show at the Burnaby Art Gallery about the community of artists in British Columbia. In 2010, his posthumous show Ouroborus: A Survey of Paintings by Ron Stonier 1963-1989, a 25-year retrospective, was held at the newly opened Trench Gallery, Vancouver to critical acclaim. In 2012, the Vancouver Art Gallery held a show titled Lights Out! Canadian Painting from the 1960s and included his Holy Man painting. In 2019, Ron Stonier: A Concept of Time was exhibited at the West Vancouver Art Museum.
