= Alison Houston Lockerbie Newton =

Canadian painter

- Born: Alison Houston Lockerbie; 1890; Leith, Scotland
- Died: 1967 (aged 76–77); Toronto, Ontario, Canada
- Known for: Painter, Printmaker
- Spouse: Stanley Newton (m. 1916)

Alison Houston Lockerbie Newton (1890–1967) was a Canadian painter known for her watercolours and woodblock prints.

== Biography ==
Newton was born in Leith, Scotland in 1890. From 1900 to 1905 she studied at Trinity Academy in Edinburgh. Newton emigrated with her family to Manitoba, Canada, in 1910. Her first artistic employment was illustrating for the T. Eaton Company.

In 1916, Newton married Stanley Newton. After her marriage she returned to university, studying at the Winnipeg School of Art. Her teachers included Alexander J. Musgrove, LeMoine FitzGerald, Frank Johnston, and Walter J. Phillips.

From 1930 through 1948 Newton exhibited with the Art Association of Montreal, and in 1941 she exhibited at the Royal Canadian Academy of Arts.

She was a member of a number of art associations including the Manitoba Society of Artists, the Federation of Canadian Artists, the Winnipeg Sketch Club, the Canadian Arts Council, and the Arts Council of Manitoba.

Newton died in 1967 in Toronto, Ontario.

Newton was included in the 2013 exhibition Herstory: Art by Women in The University of Winnipeg Collection at Gallery 1C03 at the University of Winnipeg.
