= Clarence Tillenius =

Canadian artist (1913–2012)

- Born: August 31, 1913; Sandridge, Manitoba, Canada
- Died: January 22, 2012 (aged 98); Winnipeg, Manitoba, Canada
- Known for: diorama maker, painter, sculptor

Clarence Tillenius, CM OM LL. D. (August 31, 1913 – January 22, 2012) was a Canadian artist, environmentalist, and advocate for the protection of wildlife and wilderness.

Tillenius's paintings are found in private and corporate collections across North America and in Japan, Sweden and Squamish British Columbia.

== Biography ==
=== Early years ===
Tillenius was born August 31, 1913, in Sandridge, Manitoba, to parents of Swedish and Norwegian ancestry. He grew up with six siblings on a farm in the Manitoba Interlake region, located 100 km north of Winnipeg.

His parents recognized his artistic skills when he created a portrait of the family dog at the young age of four and he sketched, painted or drew every day until his death. Tillenius attended Clematis School in 1919 and kept in correspondence with his teacher Marion Archibald (Irwin) until her death.

Tillenius attended high school in Teulon, Manitoba, but never attended university due to the Great Depression. Tillenius educated himself by acquiring and reading books and had over 5,000 books in his library at the time of his death.

=== Personal life and Career ===
Tillenius sold his first cover to the Country Guide in 1934. To support himself Tillenius worked on farms, mines, lumber camps, railroad crews, forest fire crews and construction crews in Manitoba and Ontario. This time spent working and living out of doors led to his passion for wilderness and wildlife in Canada.

He barely escaped death in a railway line reconstruction accident at Hudson, Ontario in 1936, losing his right arm at the shoulder after falling under a CNR rock car while operating a steam shovel. During recovery at the hospital in Sioux Lookout, a nurse and doctor encouraged him to learn to paint using his left hand. This encouraged Tillenius to persevere and to redevelop his painting skills using his left hand.

He received the tutelage of a fine artist and great friend, Alexander J. Musgrove, who established the first drawing school in Manitoba.

The Country Guide published the first magazine cover done with Tillenius' left hand in 1940, and he continued to work as an illustrator and cover designer for the magazine for 30 years. Tillenius also provided illustrations and covers for The Beaver for over 40 years, as well as many other magazines and newspapers.

Tillenius met weekly with artist and sculptor Leo Mol, cartoonist Peter Kuch and several other artists for life drawing sessions of a live model in the late 1930s and early 1940s.

Tillenius was contracted in the 1950s to create a total of 18 lifesize dioramas of buffalo, wildlife and wilderness for museums in Canada including the Canadian Museum of Nature in Ottawa, the Alberta Provincial Museum in Edmonton, the Provincial Museum in Victoria, the Manitoba Museum in Winnipeg and the Baker Lake Inuit Heritage Centre. His 51-foot diorama in the Manitoba Museum depicting a Red River buffalo hunt was completed in time for the opening of the museum in Winnipeg by her Majesty Queen Elizabeth II.

Tillenius taught wildlife drawing classes at the Okanagan Summer School of the Arts near Penticton, British Columbia, for ten years until 1978. He has also taught many other artists including bronze sculptor Peter Sawatzky, cowboy artist John Moyers and cowgirl artist Terri Moyers.

In 2005, Tillenius painted two of sixty cement polar bears, each 8 feet (2.4 m) tall and weighing 10,000 pounds (4,500 kg), created as a fundraising project for Cancer Care Manitoba. "Knights of the Polar Circle" features 15 smaller polar bears painted on it in a number of story themes. Tillenius' work "Pondering Grizzly" was the only grizzly bear in the collection and now stands guard in front of Winnipeg City Hall on Main Street. Peter Sawatzky assisted Tillenius by creating a hump on the bear's back and permanent claws characteristic of grizzly bears.

=== Expeditions ===
During 1943 to 1945, Tillenius visited and became friends with famed painter Carl Rungius in his Banff studio and in New York City. He also met painter of birds Alan Brooks in Vernon, British Columbia, and traveled with the editor of the Country Guide on a 2000-mile trip through the Rockies and British Columbia and back and forth across the plains of Saskatchewan and Alberta.

From 1948 to 1953, Tillenius observed a number of wolf-hunting expeditions in Kenora, Winnipeg and Sioux Lookout. Some of his wolf series was completed at this time.

Tillenius travelled across Canada in 1954 to create a series of 200 large oil paintings of Canada's wildlife and wilderness landscapes entitled "Monarchs of the Canadian Wilds", commissioned by the Monarch Life Assurance Company. These paintings are now grouped together in a collection at the Pavilion Gallery Museum at Assiniboine Park in Winnipeg. Hundreds of thousands of reproductions of these paintings and their accompanying texts have been distributed across Canada and around the world.

Tillenius says that

"It is my hope that people who saw them would be moved to preserve some of that matchless wilderness we are now so blessed with but which will disappear unless people who care unite to safeguard it....I want to create a body of paintings that will remain when the wilderness that inspired them has disappeared under asphalt highways, hydro lines and the survey trails of oil exploration companies."

The paintings depict many of Canada's principal large animals; grizzlies, black and polar bears, timber wolves, mountain lions, musk-oxen, woodland and barren caribou, moose, pronghorn antelope, dall and bighorn sheep, mule and white-tail deer.

Between 1957 and 1959 Tillenius travelled by pack-horse on a number of trips in the Canadian Rockies and Waterton Lakes with rancher, author and environmentalist friend Andy Russell. In May 1959 he packed into the Kluane with Andy and Dick Russell to paint and draw grizzly bears, wolves, moose and golden eagles.

Tillenius left for a study trip to Europe in 1962 and was able to view the works of Anders Zorn, Bruno Liljefors of Uppsala, Sweden and the animal painter and illustrator Harald Wiberg. He also studied the Impressionists, traveled to Scotland, and viewed the Sargents in the Tate in London.

In 1964 Tillenius joined Ralph Hedlin who was on a writing and photography assignment for Maclean'sand the pair traveled with Inuit by dog team, lived in igloos, and observed firsthand the hunt for polar bears on Southampton Island in modern day Nunavut. In August of that year he traveled to Vancouver Island to hunt with Jim Dewar and to choose the environment and paint the background to be depicted in a cougar diorama in Victoria.

In 1968, Tillenius and Ralph Hedlin traveled to Southampton Island again to observe a polar bear hunt and Inuit life as studies for a polar bear diorama. Tillenius also completed his pronghorn and buffalo dioramas in time for the opening of the Manitoba Museum of Man and Nature.

Tillenius continued to study museum methods, diorama construction and mammal groups. In 1967 he visited the Buffalo Park near Wainwright, Alberta to record the reminiscences of old buffalo herders.

=== Death ===
Tillenius died in Winnipeg on January 22, 2012, at the age of 98. At the artist's request, his family issued the following text after his death.

I believe that there is in the universe an underlying rhythm, a stream of life common to all ages; that the work of an artist who could tap into that rhythm would be timeless, it would be understood in any age, since man himself is bound by, and responds to, the same rhythm as the animals.

When that rhythm calls me to a universe other than this one; I ask each of you, who wish to remember me, to look at my paintings or my dioramas. As long as my work is appreciated by the generations that follow, my work will have tapped into that rhythm and will be timeless; even though I have now crossed that great Divide.

— Clarence Tillenius,

== Recognition ==
Clarence Tillenius was a:

- Founding member of the Society of Animal Artists, New York
- Founding member of the Society for Wildlife Art of the Nations, England
- Past president and life member of the Manitoba Naturalists Society, now Nature Manitoba

Clarence Tillenius received the following distinctive awards and elections:

- Order of Canada in 2005
- Order of Manitoba in 2003
- Honorary Doctorate of Laws from the University of Winnipeg in 1970
- Elected a fellow to the Explorers Club, New York, NY in 1967 and recently as a Fellow Emeritus
- Elected a fellow of the Royal Geographical Society, London
- Professional Wildlife Conservation Award by the Government of Manitoba

Tillenius's dioramas were designated as National Treasures in 2007 by the Canadian Museum of Nature in Ottawa.

The Pavilion Gallery Museum in Winnipeg's Assiniboine Park opened a permanent gallery honoring Tillenius and his art in 1998. A collection of his work remains on public display year round.

== Conservation work ==
Tillenius sat on numerous committees to preserve tracts of Manitoba wilderness to benefit wildlife. He felt strongly that human encroachment eliminates wildlife habitat and species, and this is the reason he painted wildlife and wilderness.

== Books ==
- Sketch Pad, out-of-doors. Winnipeg:Country Guide, 1956. Second edition: Country Guide, 1962.
- Fur bearing animals. Edmonton:Alberta Department of Lands and Forests, 1959.
- The wild dogs; a story of wolves in Manitoba. Text by Allan Murray. Illustrations by Clarence Tillenius. Winnipeg:Manitoba Dept. of Mines and Natural Resources, Conservation Extension Branch, 1969. Reprinted 1970, 1971 and 1980.
- Buffalo. Edited by John E. Foster, Dick Harrison, I. S. McLaren. Edmonton:University of Alberta Press, 1992. Illustrations of a number of Tillenius paintings with a section written by Tillenius on 'An Artist Among the Buffalo'; and a section written by I.S. McLaren on Tillenius as an artist. The University of Alberta Press, 1992.
- Days of the Buffalo: paintings. Foreword by Philip H. R. Stepney. Winnipeg:Trails of the Interlake Studio, 1998. Second edition with commentary by I. S. MacLaren: Interlake Studio, 2000.
- Deer Hunting Hints. by C.I. Tillenius, Canadian Industries Limited

== Art publications ==
Other pieces of Tillenius's art were published in magazines across the continent including:

- Country Guide
- The Beaver
- Nature Magazine, Washington, D.C.
- The Montreal Standard
- Weekend Picture Magazine
- Virginia Wildlife
- Star Weekly
- Sports Afield (New York)
- Fur Trade Journal
- Saturday Night
- Rod and Gun
- Game and Fish Magazine
- Pelli and Pellicce
- Esperanto Magazine

Tillenius also provided illustrations for the following books:

- Little Giant by Olive Knox, published by Ryerson Press, Toronto
- North of "55" by C.P. Wilson
- Kirby's Gander by J.P. Gillese
- Furbearers of Canada published by Hudson's Bay Co.
- Brief History of the Hudson's Bay Co.
- What's Ahead for Prairie Agriculture by H.S. Fry
- The First Fifty Years by R.D. Colquette
- Tomorrow is for You by Vera Kelsey, Scribner's, New York
- Orphan of the North by Will Henry, Random House, New York
- Black Falcon by Olive Knox, Bouregy and Curl, New York
- Encyclopedia Canadiana (10 volumes) The Grolier Society Ottawa, Ontario
- Game Birds and Animals of Manitoba Government of Manitoba
