= Assiniboine Park Zoo =

Zoo in Manitoba, Canada

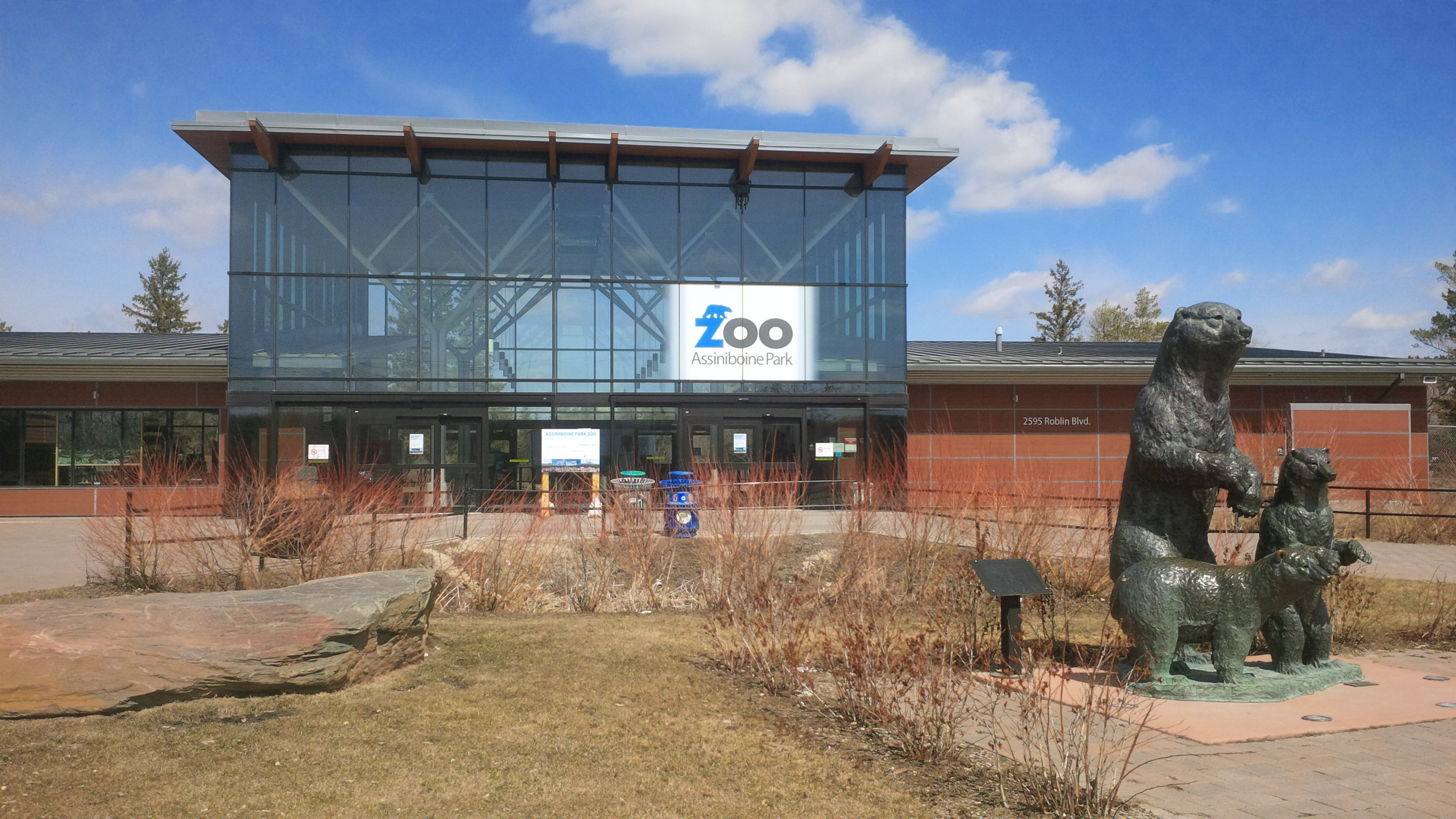
- Assiniboine Park Zoo entrance
- Interactive map of Assiniboine Park Zoo
- 49°52′09″N 97°13′50″W
- Date opened: 1904
- Location: 2595 Roblin Blvd, Winnipeg, Manitoba R3P 2N7
- Land area: 32 hectares (80 acres)
- No. of species: 160
- Memberships: CAZA; AZA
- Major exhibits: 11
- Owner: Assiniboine Park Conservancy
- Director: Grant Furniss, Senior Director of Zoological Operations
- Public transit: Winnipeg Transit; BLUE D19 22 70
- Website: assiniboinepark.ca/zoo

Assiniboine Park Zoo is a zoo facility located in the west end of Assiniboine Park in Winnipeg, Manitoba, Canada. Established in 1904, Assiniboine Park Zoo is managed by the Assiniboine Park Conservancy. It holds accreditation from the Canadian Association of Zoos and Aquariums and the Association of Zoos and Aquariums.

Covering 80 acres, there are currently over 160 species of animals living in the zoo.

== Site ==
Assiniboine Park Zoo occupies approximately 32 hectares (80 acres) in the western portion of Assiniboine Park in Winnipeg, Manitoba. Located at 2595 Roblin Boulevard, the zoo has occupied part of the park since opening in 1904. Since 2008, it has been operated by the Assiniboine Park Conservancy. The site includes outdoor animal habitats, indoor exhibit buildings, visitor facilities, gardens, and walking paths, with exhibits grouped into areas representing different parts of the world and Manitoba's natural environments.

The layout of the zoo has changed considerably over time. Beginning in the 1960s, new exhibit buildings and larger animal habitats gradually replaced many of the earlier enclosures. Redevelopment continued after the Assiniboine Park Conservancy assumed responsibility for the zoo in 2008. The following year, the Conservancy announced a $200 million, ten-year redevelopment plan that reorganized much of the site, introducing new themed exhibit areas while renovating and repurposing several existing buildings.

The zoo is divided into themed exhibit areas, including Animals of Asia, Grasslands and Boreal Forest, Journey to Churchill, Open Range, Toucan Ridge, Aunt Sally's Farm, and the Kinsmen Discovery Centre. The site also includes visitor amenities such as the Tundra Grill restaurant, playgrounds, seasonal gardens, educational facilities, and the Leatherdale International Polar Bear Conservation Centre, the zoo's principal conservation and research facility.

== History ==
=== Early years ===
In 1904, the City of Winnipeg Parks Board purchased native animals, including deer, bison, and elk to establish the zoo. A bear enclosure was built in 1908. In 1909, the zoo housed 116 animals, representing 19 different species. In 1935, it acquired its first lion; a lioness. Four years later, a wild orphaned polar bear cub named Carmichael was added to the zoo. In February 1940, Carmichael was joined by a female named Clementine.

The 1960s saw significant additions, including a gibbon and monkey house, a snow leopard, and another orphaned polar bear cub. The polar bear enclosure was renovated in 1967, adding an upper story and two more orphaned cubs. In 1968 and 1969, the Tropical House, Native Animal Exhibit, and a new south gate were added.

In the 1980s, the Zoological Society of Manitoba began to provide money for new signage, exhibits, and infrastructure. The Zoological Society reconstructed the main entrance to include a new gift store and renovated the Carousel Restaurant.

=== 2000s ===
In 2000, the Zoological Society of Manitoba and the zoo began developing the first master plan for the zoo since 1960. Although the initial proposal focused on redesigning the existing polar bear enclosure, it soon expanded into a comprehensive redevelopment plan for the zoo.

While long-term planning was underway, substantial improvements were made to the Education Center in 2004 through a collaboration with the University of Manitoba's Department of Architecture.

The decade concluded with national recognition for the zoo. In September 2014, Assiniboine Park Zoo became one of only five Canadian zoos accredited by the Association of Zoos and Aquariums.

=== Incidents ===
- In July 2014, the wolves and polar bears were temporarily removed from their display areas after one or more wolves dug their way into the polar bear enclosure. No one was hurt in the incident.
- Concerns about safety protocols increased in September 2014 when one Amur tiger gained access to another enclosure and killed another tiger.
- In November 2014, a blind seal died after getting trapped in a drain.
- In January 2019, a five-year-old polar bear named Blizzard died due to fluid in its chest.

== Exhibits and facilities ==
=== Animals of Asia ===
The Animals of Asia section of the zoo contains various rare and exotic animal species, including (as of December 2024):

- Amur Tiger (Panthera tigris altaica)
- Domestic Bactrian camel (Camelus bactrianus domestic)
- Domestic Yak (Bos grunniens)
- Red panda (Ailurus fulgens refulgens)
- Red tailed hawk (Buteo jamaicensis)
- Steller’s sea eagle (Haliaeetus pelagicus)
- Sichuan takin (Budorcas taxicolor tibetana)
- Turkmenian markhor (Capra falconeri heptameric)
- White-handed (Lar) Gibbon (Hylobates lar)

In June 2010, the Pavilion of Lions exhibit was opened, introducing a pair of African lions as the exhibit's first residents. In April 2012, the African lions were replaced with Asian lions in the Pavilion of Lions, making Assiniboine Park Zoo the very first facility in North America to house a pair of Asian lions. In 2013, a new 2,400 m^{2} (26,000 ft^{2}) expansion of the enclosure for the Siberian tigers was constructed and opened. The new enclosure would assist the breeding program.

=== Aunt Sally's Farm ===
The zoo contains a child-friendly learn-and-play area, Aunt Sally's Farm, which is located next to a playground, and has a wishing well.

Unlike the current exhibit, the old Aunt Sally's Farm used to be a petting zoo that operated between 1959 and 1989. It was replaced by the Kinsman Discovery Center, which opened on March 23, 1990.

The current farm includes the following mammals:

- Kiko goat (Capra hircus)
- Llama (Lama glama)
- Nubian goat (Capra hircus)
- Pygmy goat (Capra hircus)
- Sardinian miniature donkey (Equus asinus domesticus)
- Vietnamese pot-bellied pig (Sus scrofa)
- Common Peafowl (Pavo cristatus)

=== Grasslands and Boreal Forests ===
The Grasslands & Boreal Forest section features animal species that are native to North America.

After the exhibit Journey to Churchill opened in 2014, an enclosure for an additional species of wolves was added. In June 2018, the Grasslands & Boreal Forest exhibit opened, featuring four male and one female gray wolves.

As of 2024, species contained in the grasslands and boreal forest include:

Mammals

- American bison (Bison bison)
- American Elk (Cervus canadensis)
- Canada lynx (Lynx canadensis)
- Grey Wolf (Canis lupus)
- Reindeer (Rangifer tarandus)
- Rocky Mountain Big Horn Sheep (Ovid canadensis canadensis)
- Siberian Musk Deer (Moschus moschiferus)
- Snow leopard (Panthera uncia)

Birds

- American white pelican (Pelecanus erythrorhynchos)
- Burrowing owl (Athene cunicularia)
- Florida Sandhill crane (Grus canadensis pratensis)
- Greater white-fronted goose (Anser albifrons)
- Snow Goose (Anser caerulescens)

=== Journey to Churchill ===
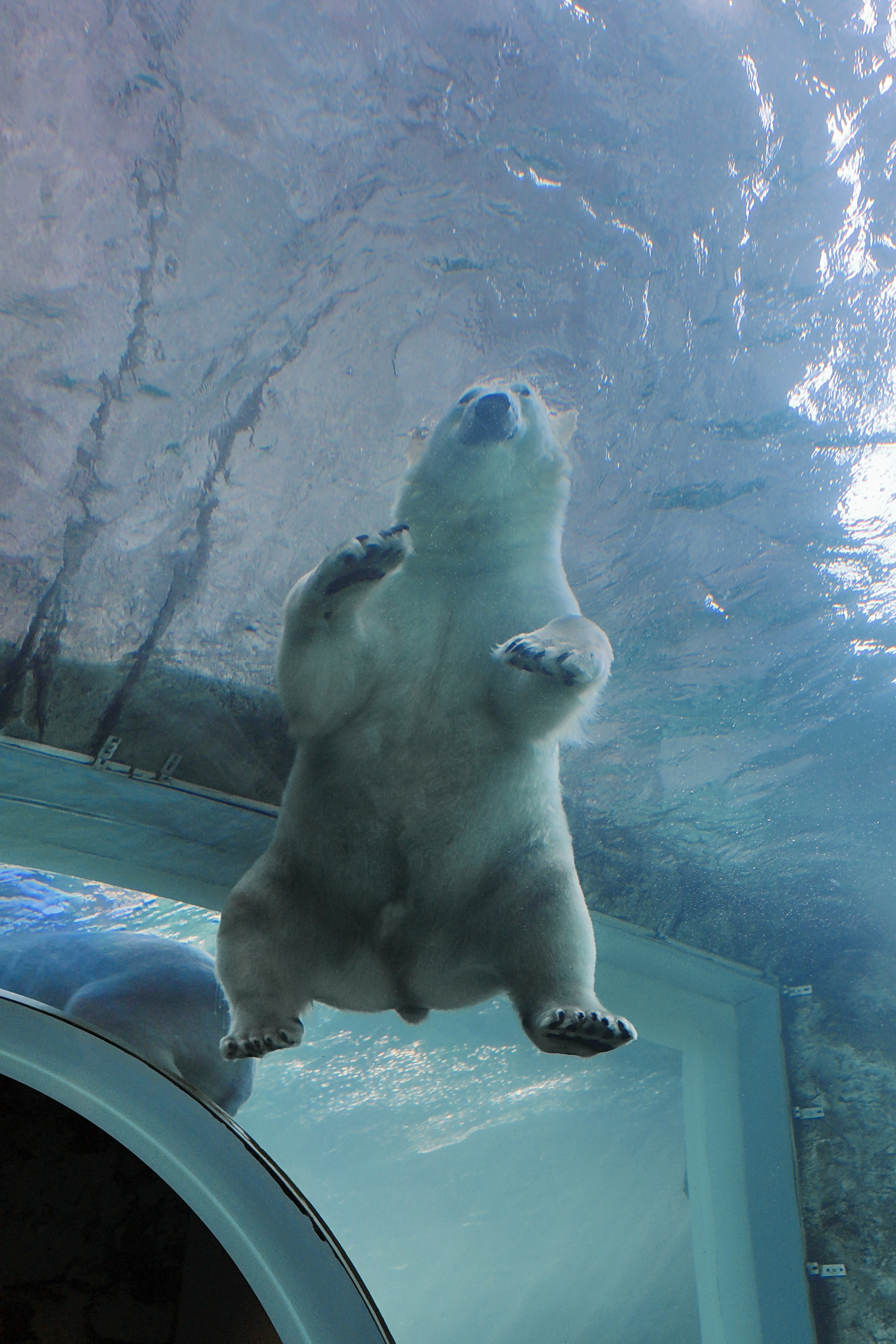
Polar Bear at Journey to Churchill Exhibit

Journey to Churchill is an exhibit representing various habitats of northern Manitoba and is the most comprehensive northern species exhibit of its kind in the world. The exhibit is named for the town of Churchill, on Hudson Bay in Northern Manitoba, which is home to the largest polar bear denning area in the world. The exhibit features expansive habitats for:

- Harbor (Common) Seal (Phoca vitulina)
- Muskox (Ovibos moschatus)
- Polar bear (Ursus maritimus)
- Reindeer (Rangifer tarandus)
- Snowy owl (Nyctea scandiaca)

The exhibit also features the Gateway to the Arctic, which includes: an underwater viewing tunnel called the Sea Ice Passage that houses polar bears and seals, who are separated by a clear wall; a short-film experience inside the 360-degree Aurora Borealis Theatre; and other interactive and interpretive components.

Inside the Journey to Churchill exhibit is also the Leatherdale International Polar Bear Conservation Centre (IPBCC), an interpretive center sponsored by Calm Air that offers information regarding polar bears, the Arctic ecosystem, research in action, climate change, etc. Also located inside the Journey to Churchill exhibit is the Tundra Grill is a 150-seat restaurant, with views of the largest of three polar bear habitats in the exhibit.

The International Polar Bear Conservation Center was opened in January 2012, followed by the Journey to Churchill Northern Species exhibit in July 2014 as a permanent area.

=== Kinsmen Discovery Center ===
The Kinsmen Discovery Center contains six galleries about different life forms—water, grasslands, air, underground, and two forest galleries—and is the zoo's second-biggest indoor exhibit with fish, snakes, reptiles, etc.

Announced in November 1986 and originally planned to open in the fall of 1987, the center broke ground in June 1988. Costing $1.75 million, the 743-square-metre (8,000 sq ft) Kinsman Discovery Center opened on March 23, 1990, two-and-a-half years late and $550,000 over budget. It replaced the old Aunt Sally's Farm, which operated between 1959 and 1989.

A statue honoring Winnipeg the Bear—the bear that was made famous as Winnie-the-Pooh—was unveiled in 1992 and has since been relocated to the Nature Playground in the general Park area.

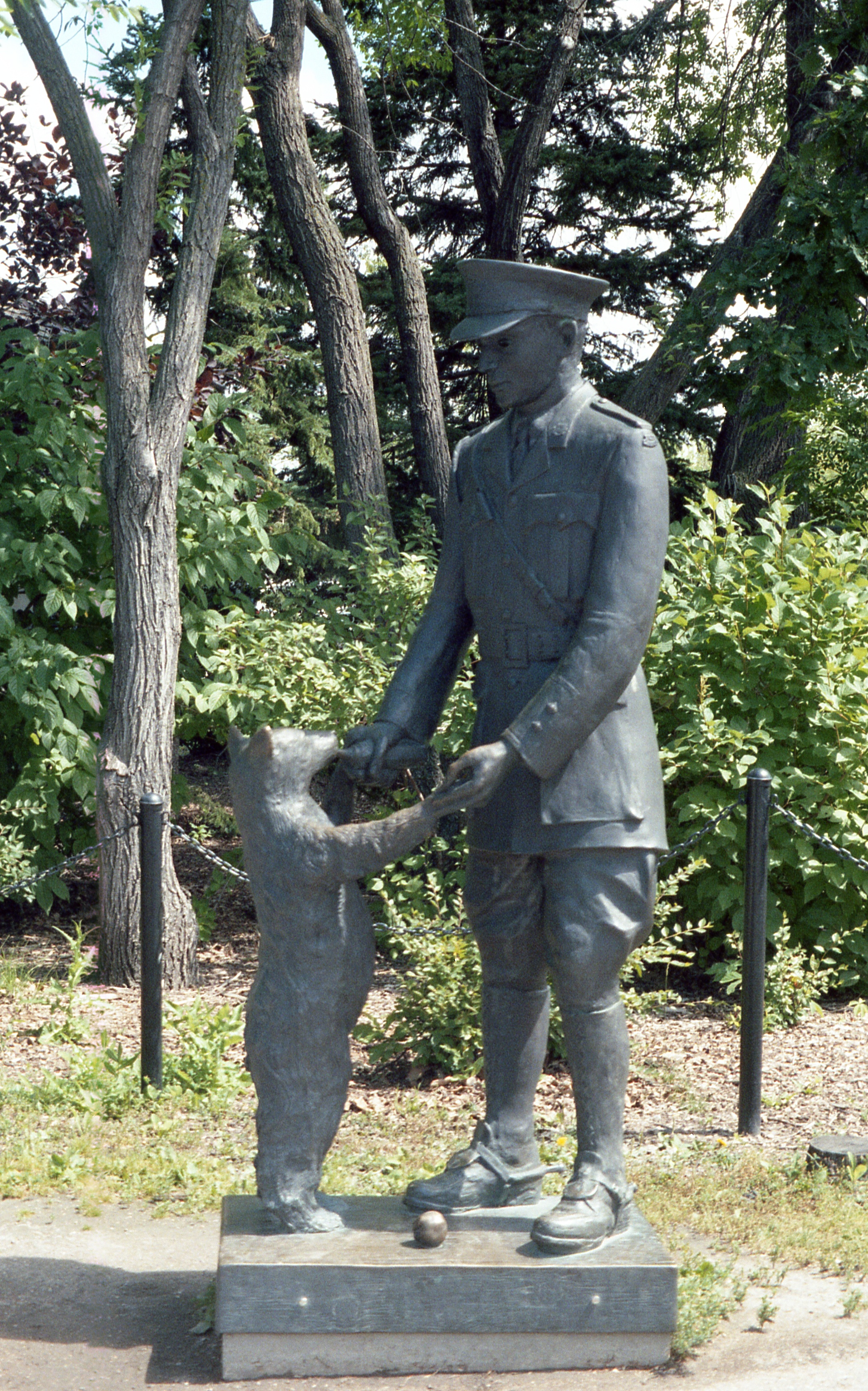
Winnie-the-Bear statue, unveiled in 1992

As of 2021, species contained at the Kinsmen Discovery Center include:

Crustaceans and Insects

- Anemones
  - Bubble-tip anemone (Entacmaea quadricolor)
  - Pink-tipped anemone (Condylactis)
- Central American giant cave cockroach (Blaberus giganteus)
- Crabs
  - Tricolor hermit crab (Clibanarius tricolor)
- Snails
  - Crowned astrea snail (Astraea)
  - Giant west African land snail (Archachatina ventricosa)
  - Zebra nerite snail (Neritina natalensis)

Fish

- Banded archerfish (Toxotes jaculatrix)
- Congo Tetra (Phenacogrammus interruptus)
- Catfish
  - Angel Squeaker Catfish (Synodontis angelicus)
  - Blotched upside-down catfish (Synodontis nigriventris)
  - Corydoras catfish (Corydoras)
  - Featherfin squeaker catfish (Synodontis uterus)
  - Pygmy leopard catfish (Synodontis petricola)
- Leopard bush fish (Ctenopoma acutirostre)
- Madagascar rainbowfish (Bedotia geayi)
- Mexican blind cave fish (Astyanax jordani)
- Striated Sturgeonfish (Ctenochaetus striatus)
- Clownfish
  - Peacock clownfish (Amphiprion ocellaris)
  - Pink Skunk Clownfish (Amphiprion ocellaris)
  - Tomato Clownfish (Amphiprion frenatus)
- Saddled bichir (Polypterus endlicheri)
- Tangs
  - Blue regal (hippo) tang (Paracanthurus hepatus)
  - Purple (Yellow-tailed) tang (Zebrasoma xanthurum)
  - Yellow tang (Zebrasoma flavescens)
- Yellowtail Damselfish (Chrysiptera parasema)

Reptiles and Amphibians

- New Caledonia Bumpy (Gargoyle) Gecko (Rhacodactylus auriculatus)
- Solomon Island Skink (Corucia zebrata)
- Black Tree Monitor (Varanus beccarii)

Birds

- Black-naped fruit dove (Ptilinopus melanospilus)
- Superb Starling (Lamprotornis superbus superbus)
- Taveta golden weaver (Ploceus castaneiceps)

Mammals

- Kinkajou (Potos flavus)
- Linnaeus’s two toed sloth (Choloepus didactylus)
- Naked mole rat (Heterocephalus glaber)
- Prehensile-tailed porcupine (Coendou prehensillis)
- Slender-tailed meerkat (Suricata suricatta)
- Southern three-banded armadillo (Tolypeutes matacus)

=== Open Range ===
The Open Range section is located at the center of the Zoo and features various animals from around the world, including:

Mammals

- Common Wallaroo (Macropus robustus)
- Guanaco (Lama guanicoe)
- Llama (Lama glama)
- Pronghorn (Antilocapra americana)
- Red kangaroo (Macropus rufus)
- West Caucasian Tur (Capra caucasica)

Birds

- Demoiselle crane (Anthropoides virgo)
- Emu (Dromaius novaehollandiae)

=== Toucan Ridge ===
Toucan Ridge, originally known as the Tropical House, is an exhibit featuring animal, bird, and plant life of the new-world tropics of Central and South America.

Constructed in 1971 for $500,000, the original 1,230-square-metre (13,200 sq ft) Tropical House building first opened to the public in November 1972 and almost doubled the Zoo's total species. Temperatures inside the Tropical House would be maintained at a constant 27 °C (80 °F).

In 2009, the zoo contracted with demolition company Klassen Concrete to demolish the early 1970s Tropical House. Instead of demolishing the structure, plans were implemented to repurpose the existing building while re-configuring its displays. The project took five months to complete, with infrastructure renewal costing $900,000 and exhibit renewal costing $2.1 million.

On April 20, 2011, the first new exhibit as part of the Assiniboine Park Zoo's redevelopment plans, Toucan Ridge, was opened.

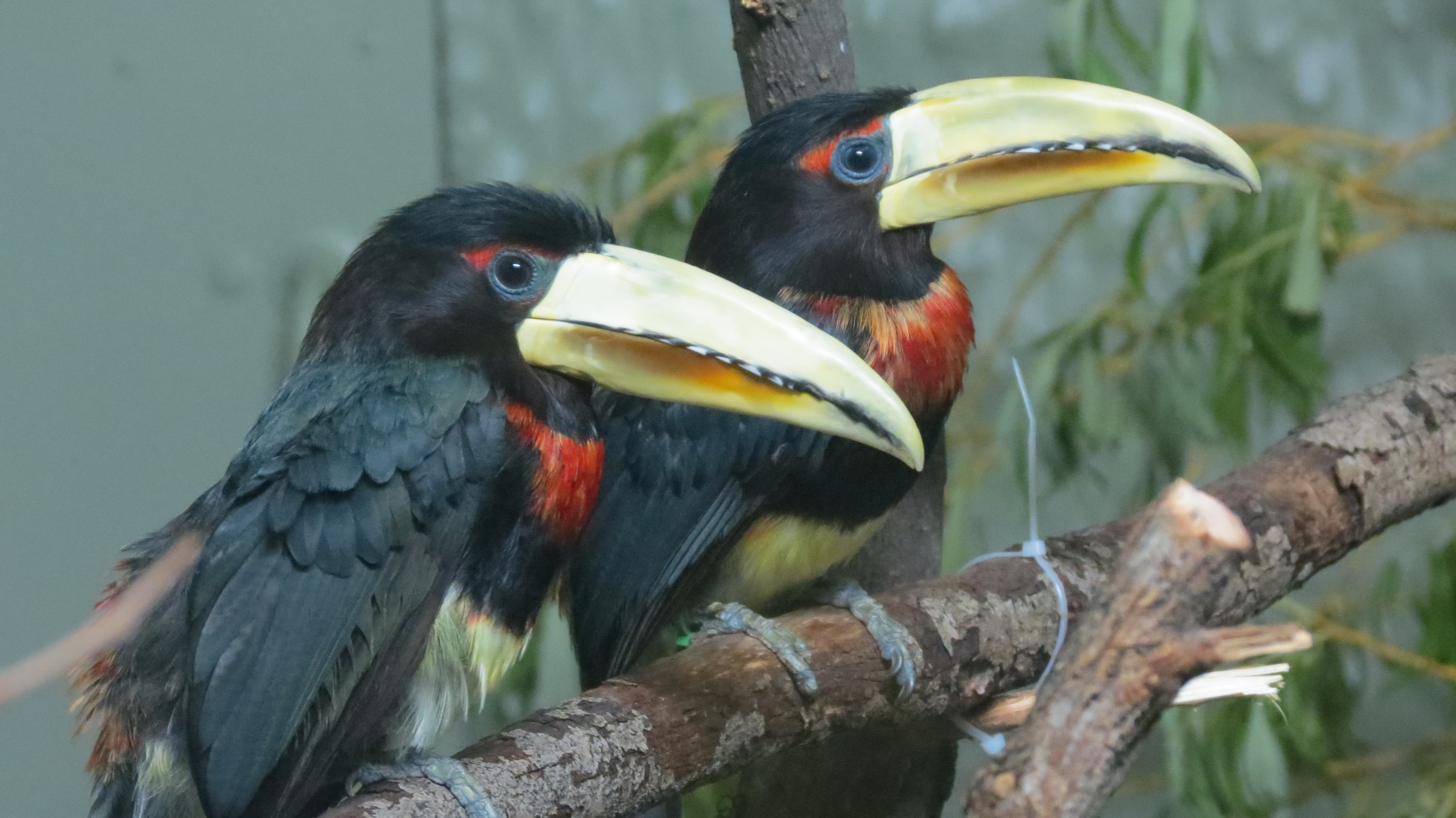
Toucans (Ramphastidae) at Assiniboine Park Zoo (2012)

As of 2025, species contained at the Toucan Ridge include:

Mammals

- Common squirrel monkey (Saimiri sciureus)
- Goeldi's monkey (Callimico goeldii)
- Indian fruit bat (flying fox) (Pteropus giganteus)
- Patagonian mara (Dolichotis patagonum)
- Red panda (Ailurus fulgens refulgens)
- Ring tailed lemur (Lemur catta)
- Seba's short-tailed bat (Carollia perspicillata)

Birds

- Blue-billed curassow (Crax alberti)
- Blue-throated piping guan (Pipile cumanensis)
- Great horned owl (Bubo virginianus)
- Marbled Teal (Marmaronetta angustirostris)
- Mourning dove (Zenaida macroura)
- Peruvian thick-knee (Burhinus superciliaris)
- Reeve's pheasant (Syrmaticus reevesii)
- Red-crested wood partridge (Rollulus rouloul)
- Roseate spoonbill (Platalea ajaja)
- Scarlet ibis (Eudocimus ruber)
- Sulphur-crested cockatoo (Cacatua galerita)
- Sun Conure (Aratinga solstitialis)
- Sunbittern (Eurypyga helias)

Reptiles and Amphibians

- Boa constrictor (Boa constrictor)
- Cuvier's dwarf caiman (Paleosuchus palpebrosus)
- Green iguana (Iguana iguana)
- New Caledonia Bumpy (Gargoyle) Gecko (Rhacodactylus auriculatus)
- Red-footed Tortoise (Chelonoidis carbonarius)
- Reticulated Python (Malayopython reticulatus)
- South American Yellow-footed Tortoise (Geochelone denticulata)
- Solomon Islands Leaf Frog (Ceratobatrachus guentheri)
- White tree (Dunny) frog (Pelodryas caerulea)
- Yellow anaconda (Eunectes notaeus)
- Yellow-spotted Amazon river turtle (Podocnemis unifilis)

=== Others ===
Dinosaurs Uncovered is an interactive dinosaur exhibit that opens during the summer. Outdoors, it features 17 life-size animatronic dinosaurs along a forested trail; indoors, it features dinosaur skeletons, fossils, and artifacts. It consists of species from the Triassic, Jurassic, and Cretaceous periods, including the Tyrannosaurus Rex and the feathered Dakotaraptor.

The McFeetors Heavy Horse Center is a year-round exhibit that is currently home to two breeds of horses (Equus caballus)—the Percheron draft horse and the Clydesdale draft horse—and includes a barn, pastures, paddocks, and a carriage shed. The 1.9-hectare (4.7-acre) center was announced in September 2014 and officially opened on August 28, 2015.

The Shirley Richardson Butterfly Garden, located next to the Toucan Ridge exhibit, is a permanent seasonal exhibit of various butterfly species and is open from late spring to early fall. It was opened in June 2009 and covers 200 m^{2} (2,200 ft^{2}).

==== Events ====
Major community events take place annually in both the Zoo and Park. As of 2021, events held at the Zoo include the following:

- Brew at the Zoo is an event showcasing Manitoba's local craft beer, wine, and spirits industry.
- Wildest Dreams is a zoo experience offered to families facing health and/or socio-economic barriers.
- The Zoo Lights Festival is the holiday light show that takes place between the late fall and early winter months and has been held since 2019.

==== Former exhibits and events ====
- A special Australian exhibit featuring koalas from the San Diego Zoo was created in 1993 and was open to the public between May 12 and September 19 in the former Aunt Sally's Farm space. After the koalas left, this enclosure was used for Matschie's tree kangaroos.
- Boo at the Zoo was started in 1996 as a Halloween event. In the first year, 40,000 people attended over ten days. By its 10th anniversary in 2006, when the Pumpkin Patch Maze, Area 54, and Boo Alley were added to the attractions, the event was attended by 57,400 visitors.
- Lights of the Wild, featuring animal light sculptures presented by the Zoo and the Society, was first opened in 1996 for 3 weeks in the winter. It was discontinued in 2000, and the lights were all sold to Portage Island of Lights.
- Stingray Beach was a rotating exhibit that debuted in 2019 on the May long weekend. However, after a month-and-a-half, three male specimens died from undetermined causes.
- A temporary exhibit, Extreme Bugs, was featured at the Zoo during the summer of 2018.

== Operations ==
The Zoo hosts summertime day camps for children of all ages, as well as guided school and group tours.

=== Conservation and research ===
Located inside the Journey to Churchill exhibit, the Leatherdale International Polar Bear Conservation Center (IPBCC), named after Doug and Louise Leatherdale and sponsored by Calm Air, is the Zoo's central hub for research projects and conservation, as well as an interpretive center providing wildlife education. Opened in 2012, it was established with funding from the Government of Manitoba as part of the provincial Polar Bear Protection Amendment Act and houses the Conservation and Research Department of Assiniboine Park Conservancy. IPBCC is overseen by an advisory board, currently chaired by Dr. Stephen Petersen, who is also the Zoo's Director of Conservation and Research.

The Zoo's conservation efforts are focused on three areas: arctic and subarctic species conservation; Manitoba species conservation; and conservation of international species that are at risk.

As of 2021, current projects relating to arctic and subarctic species conservation include a study mapping out denning areas of polar bears; the study of polar-bear biology through non-invasive techniques; a collaborative project with researchers at the University of Manitoba into the technologies that enable the identification of individual polar bears; a project collecting and classifying underwater images of beluga whales in the Churchill River, in partnership with Polar Bears International, Zooniverse, and Explore.org, and support by the RBC Foundation; and a project (sponsored by Calm Air) monitoring the response of ringed and harbor seal in the Hudson Bay to changes in sea ice.

As of 2021, current projects relating to Manitoba species conservation include:

- A head-starting program, initiated in 2017, for Poweshiek Skipperling
- A project involving the recovery of burrowing owls
- The Saving Animals From Extinction (SAFE) project, is currently involved in saving the monarch butterfly and North American songbirds.

=== Public access and funding ===
When Assiniboine Park Zoo opened in 1904, admission was free. During the twentieth century, the zoo introduced additional revenue sources, including a gift shop, as it expanded its facilities and programs.

On 26 May 1993, Winnipeg City Council amended the Parks and Recreation By-law to introduce admission fees, ending nearly 90 years of free public admission.
