= Peter Sawatzky =

Canadian sculptor

Peter Sawatzky OM
- Born: 1951 (age 74–75); Sommerfeld, Manitoba, Canada
- Education: Red River College
- Known for: sculptor
- Awards: Order of Manitoba

Peter Sawatzky (born 1951) is a Canadian sculptor from the southern Manitoba community of Sommerfeld. He is known for his large-scale work in bronze, many of animals.

Notable works by Sawatzky include Seal River Crossing (2007) at Portage and Main in Winnipeg, Mother Polar Bear and Cubs (2014) at the Assiniboine Park Zoo, and a sculpture of Dirk Willems at the Mennonite Heritage Village in Steinbach, Manitoba (2018).

== Life and career ==
Peter Sawatzky was born in 1951 in the Mennonite village of Sommerfeld, near Altona, Manitoba. He grew up on his family's farm in Sommerfeld, and attended the Commercial Art Course at Red River College in Winnipeg through a scholarship.

In 1974, Sawatzky discovered his true interest which combined his fascination for bird life and for carving. The first 15 years of his career were dedicated to mostly woodcarving and illustration, along with some painting. He first carved birds in basswood using the wildlife in the Spruce Woods Provincial Park in Manitoba as models.

Awards and exhibitions won the artist international recognition, and by the mid 1980s, his success enabled him to make the decision to work in bronze and to set up his own foundry in Manitoba. In 1995, he cast a 4,000-pound (1,800 kg) bronze sculpture entitled The Passage of Time for the south side of Winnipeg's Charleswood Bridge.

One of Sawatzky's major influences is the wildlife artist and environmentalist Clarence Tillenius, who Sawatzky studied art, life drawing, and sculpting with at the Okanagan Summer Farm for one summer.

He received the Order of Manitoba in recognition of his work in 2008.

Later in life, Sawatzky moved near Glenboro.

== Notable works ==
Name	Year	Description	Location
The Passage of Time	1995	A 4,000-pound (1,800 kg) bronze sculpture.	Winnipeg (Charleswood Bridge)
Perilous Crossing	2004	A 22-foot (6.7 m) life-size outdoor bronze sculpture depicting a boat with seven crewmen.	Selkirk, MB
Seal River Crossing	2007	A 29-foot (8.8 m) outdoor bronze sculpture of eleven caribou crossing a turbulent river commissioned by James Richardson & Sons in commemoration of their 150th anniversary. Sawatzky was inspired after flying over the Seal River in northern Manitoba and "seeing all those caribou crossing." This work is Sawatzky's personal favourite.	Winnipeg (Richardson Plaza, Portage & Main)
Mother Polar Bear and Cubs	2014	A 9-foot (2.7 m) tall sculpture installed at the entrance of the Assiniboine Park Zoo in Winnipeg. It depicts a polar bear mother and two cubs, and was commissioned by Bob Williams, the former chair of Polar Bears International, as a gift to the Assiniboine Park Conservancy.	Winnipeg (Assiniboine Park)
Bust of Winston Churchill	2015	A bronze bust of the titular prime minister at Sir Winston Churchill High School in Calgary, Alberta. The piece was commissioned by the Sir Winston Churchill Society of Calgary to commemorate the 50th anniversary of Churchill’s death.	Calgary, AB
Sculpture of Dirk Willems	2018	A life-size bronze sculpture based on an engraving by Jan Luyken, and located in the Mennonite Heritage Village. Depicting Dirk Willems saving his captor from the icy waters of a pond, it represents a well-known example of early Anabaptists' focus on non-violence, which ultimately cost Willems his life.	Steinbach, MB (Mennonite Heritage Village)
Sculpture of James A. Richardson Sr.		A 10.5-foot (3.2 m) sculpture located at the Winnipeg James Armstrong Richardson International Airport.	Winnipeg (Winnipeg Airport)
Sculpture of José Rizal	2019	A 6.6-foot (2 m) tall sculpture of José Rizal, a Filipino nationalist and polymath during the end of the Spanish colonial period in the Philippines, located Waterford Green Development in northwest Winnipeg.	Winnipeg

The Peter Sawatzky Sculpture Garden is currently being developed in Brandon, Manitoba, to showcase a collection of Sawatzky's sculptures at the Riverbank Discovery Centre. The collection will be themed after animals commonly found in the province.
