= Oarisma boeta =

Scientific classification
- Kingdom: Animalia
- Phylum: Arthropoda
- Class: Insecta
- Order: Lepidoptera
- Family: Hesperiidae
- Genus: Oarisma
- Species: O. boeta

Binomial name
- Oarisma boeta (Hewitson, 1870)

Synonyms
- Apaustus bilineata Dognin, 1888; Apaustus duolineata Dognin, 1891; Hesperia boeta Hewitson, 1870

Species of butterfly

Oarisma boeta is a species of butterfly found in Ecuador. It was described in 1870 by William Chapman Hewitson as Hesperia boeta then later moved to the genus Oarisma. It appears to be found in the southern part of Ecuador with a very small distribution.
