= Mennonite Heritage Village =

Museum in Steinbach, Manitoba, Canada

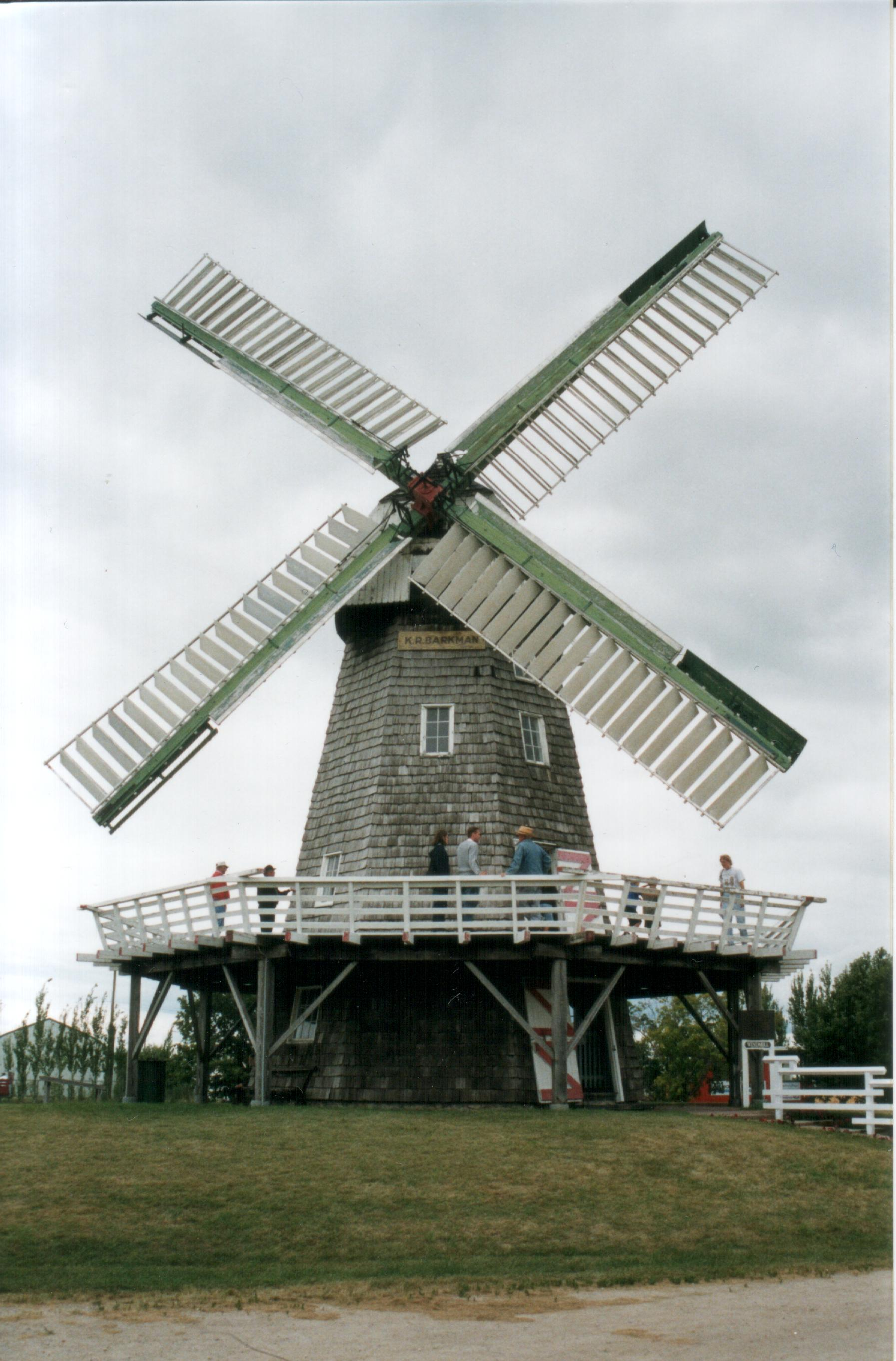
- Windmill at Mennonite Heritage Village
- Location: Steinbach, Manitoba, Canada.
- Coordinates: 49.5512°N 96.6853°W
- Type: Cultural history
- Website: mennoniteheritagevillage.com

Mennonite Heritage Village is a museum in Steinbach, Manitoba, Canada telling the story of the Low German Mennonites in Canada. The museum contains both an open-air museum open seasonally, and indoor galleries open year-round. Opened in 1967 and expanded significantly since then, the Mennonite Heritage Village is a major tourist attraction in the area and officially designated as a Manitoba Signature Museum and Star Attraction. Approximately 47,000 visitors visit the museum each year.

== History ==
The impetus for the museum began in the early 1960s after the destruction of a number of historic buildings in the area. Retired teacher John C. Reimer began to collect artifacts and established the Reimer Store museum on Main Street in Steinbach, a building that was later moved to the current museum. A committee was established in 1964 and the museum, originally called Mennonite Village Museum was opened to the public in 1967. The museum changed its name to Mennonite Heritage Village in 1987. A major expansion of the indoor galleries was completed in 1990.

== Collections and galleries ==
The village features a large collection of original Mennonite architecture, including housebarns, churches, schools, stores, a sod hut (or semlin) and other buildings, some of which date back to the 1800s. Including the village and indoor galleries, the museum's collection contains more than 16,000 artifacts. The indoor facility documents the history of Mennonites from their origins in the Netherlands and Switzerland and focuses on the Plautdietsch-speaking Mennonites who came to Western Canada from the Russian Empire. The permanent collection includes images, videos, and numerous historic artifacts, including those connected to Klaas Reimer and other important Anabaptist figures. Temporary exhibits, also open year-round, are held in the Gerhard Enns Gallery. The museum collection also includes antique tractor and transportation buildings.

The museum is famous for its Dutch windmill, a replica of the original windmill built in Steinbach in the 1880s. The first replica was burned down by arsonists in 2000, but was later rebuilt. The outdoor village also displays a section of the Berlin Wall, the original sawmill used by Mennonite Conscientious Objectors during their Alternative Service in World War II, and two important monuments originally erected in Ukraine to commemorate the centennial of Chortitza and honour the two Mennonite leaders, Jacob Hoeppner and Johann Bartsch, who chose the site and accompanied the first colonists.

In 2018, a statue of Anabaptist martyr Dirk Willems by sculptor Peter Sawatzky was unveiled on the grounds of the museum.

The museum holds numerous special events and festivals, including the Pioneer Days festival each August and Fall on the Farm each Labour Day. The museum also has a restaurant that serves Mennonite food (open seasonally) and a bookstore and gift shop (open year-round).

== Affiliations ==
The Museum is affiliated with the Canadian Museums Association, the Canadian Heritage Information Network and Virtual Museum of Canada.

== In popular culture ==
The Mennonite Heritage Village is mentioned in Miriam Toews's novel A Complicated Kindness, where the main character Nomi Nickel is a volunteer at the museum and accidentally sets her bonnet on fire. Toews, herself, was a volunteer at the museum as a teen. The museum has also been mentioned on author Andrew Unger's Mennonite satire website The Daily Bonnet, including the website's very first article "Steinbach City Council Approves Plan to Move Entire Population to Mennonite Heritage Village" and included in the collection The Best of the Bonnet.

== Gallery ==
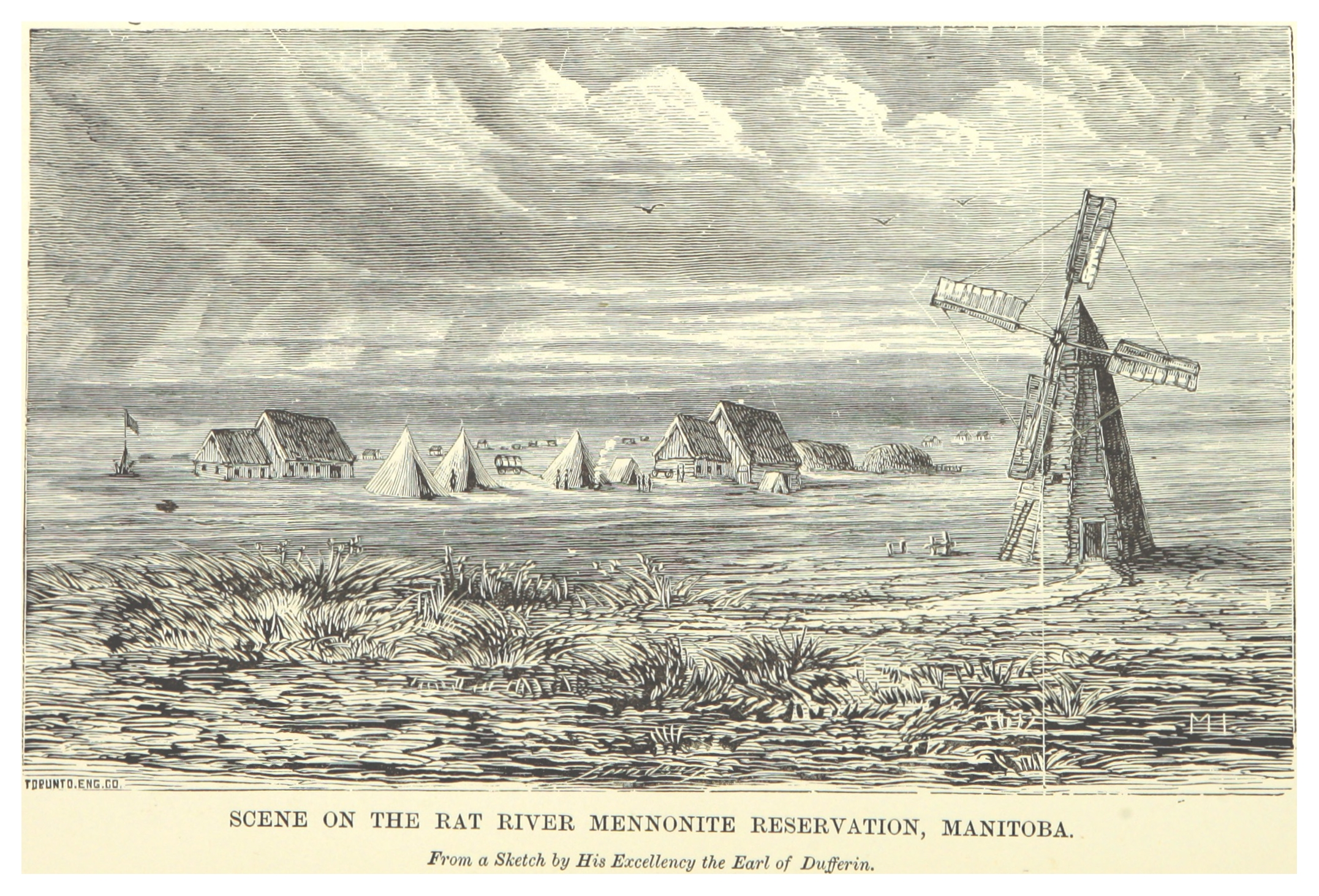
Drawing of a Mennonite settlement (Steinbach?) in Manitoba

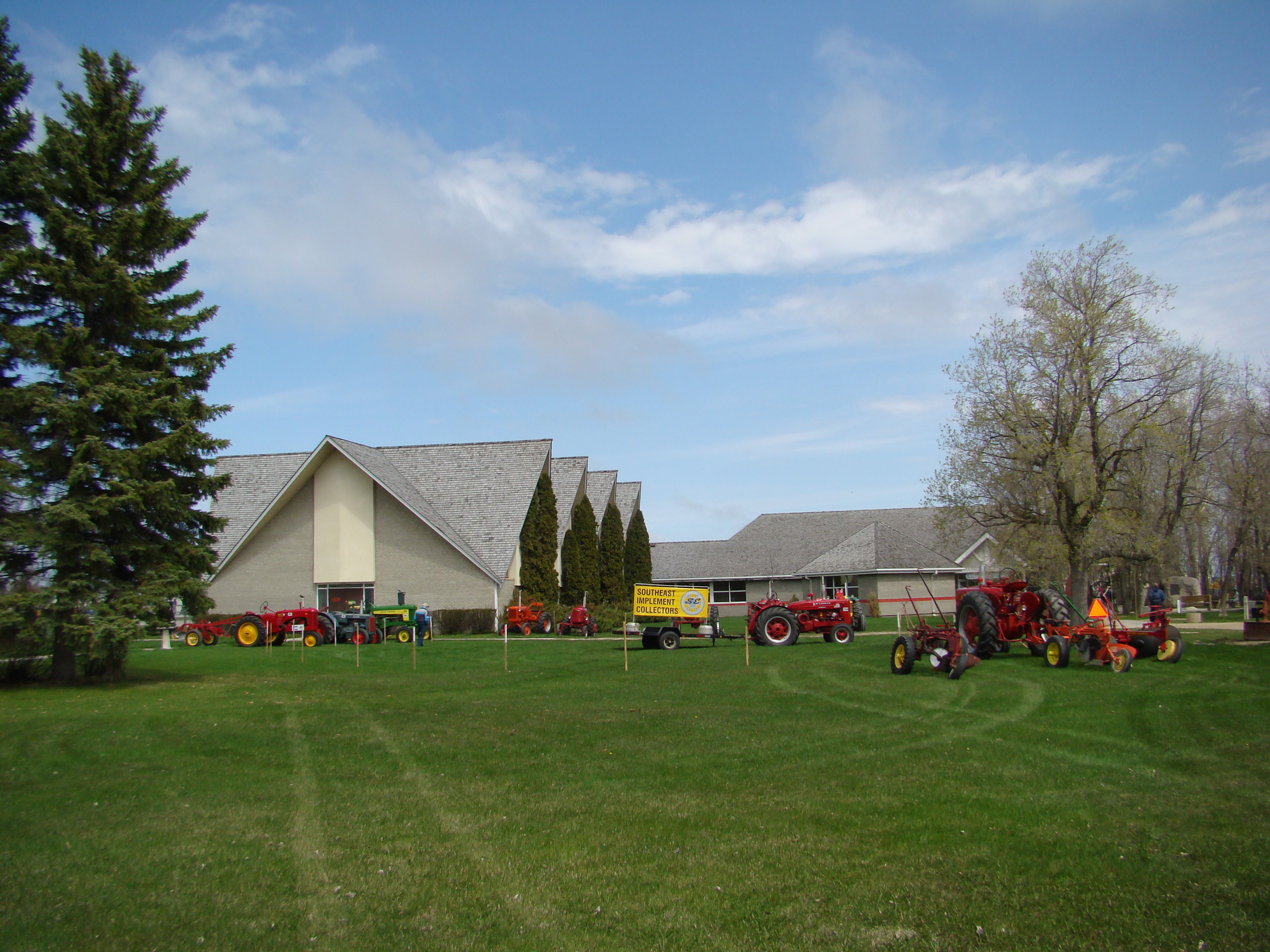
Main building

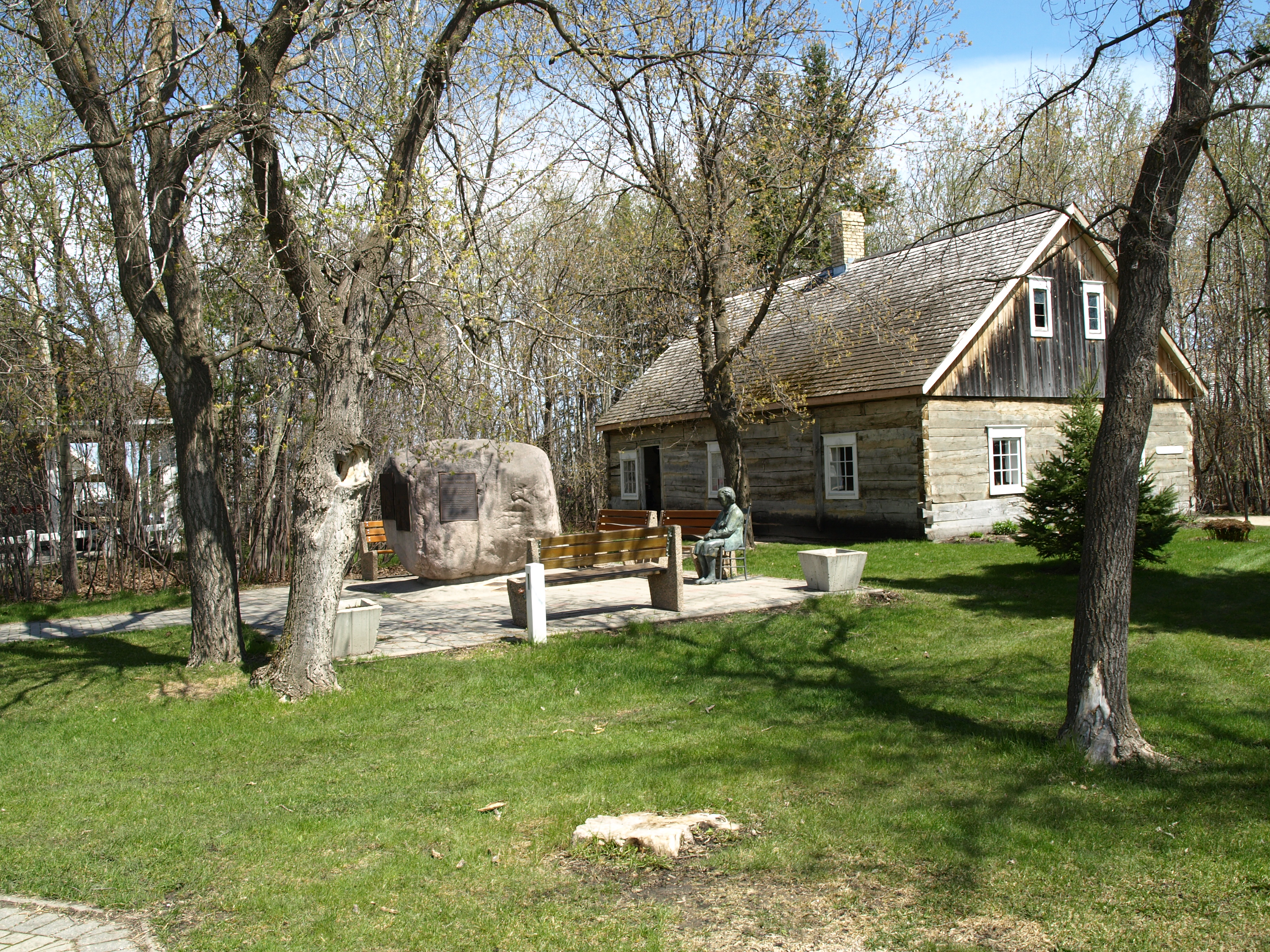
Tribute to women

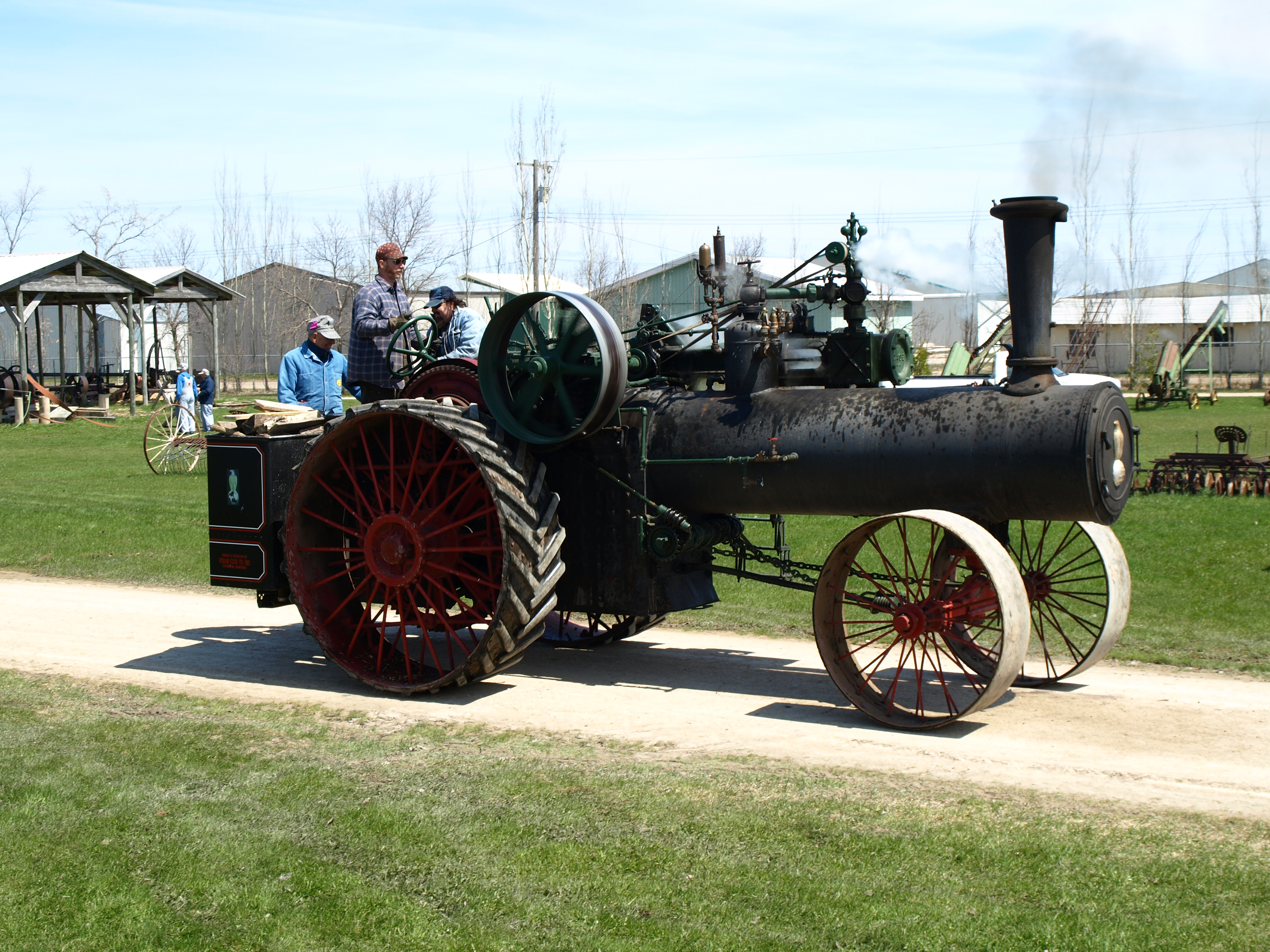
Very old tractor

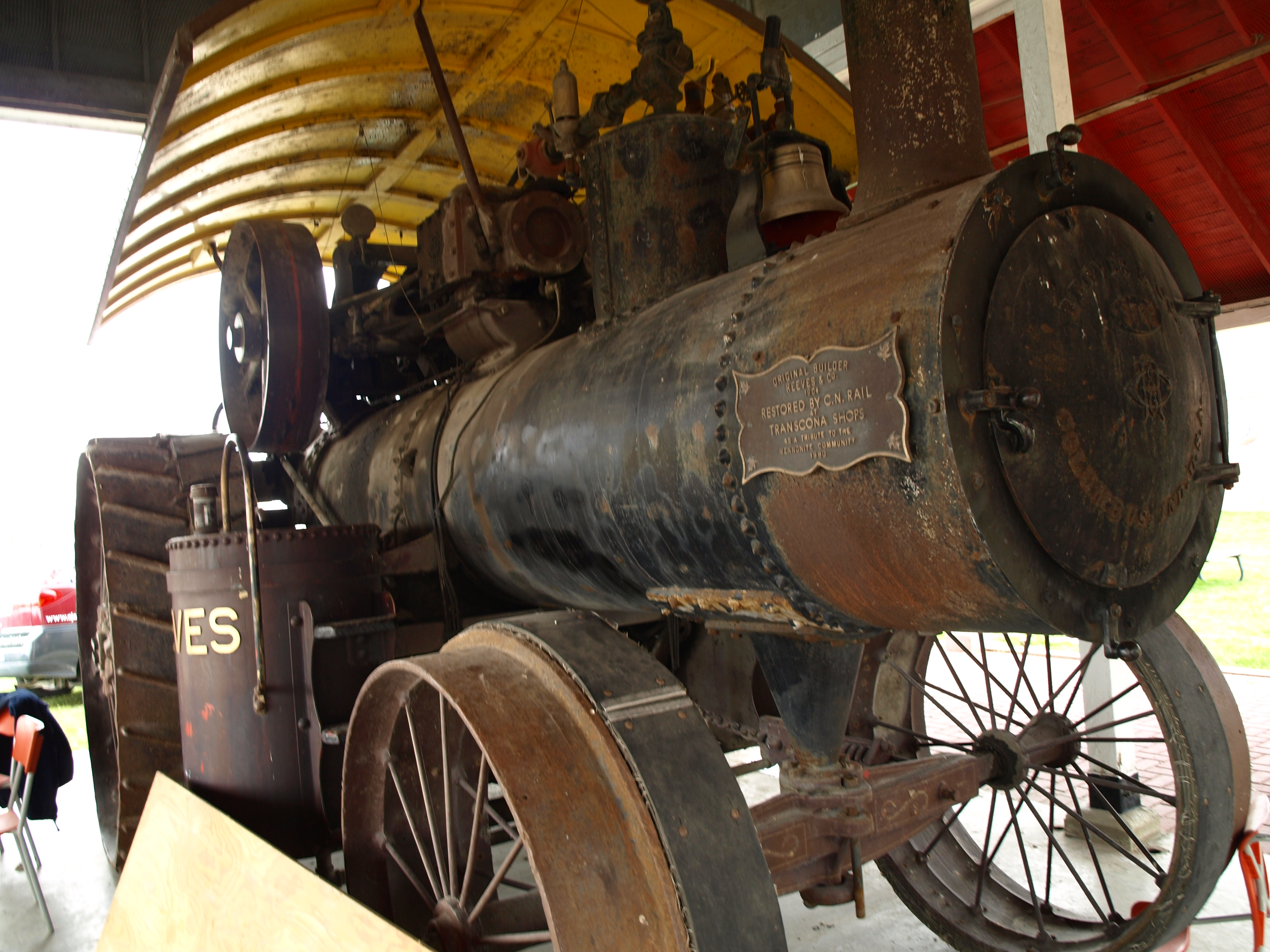
Old tractor

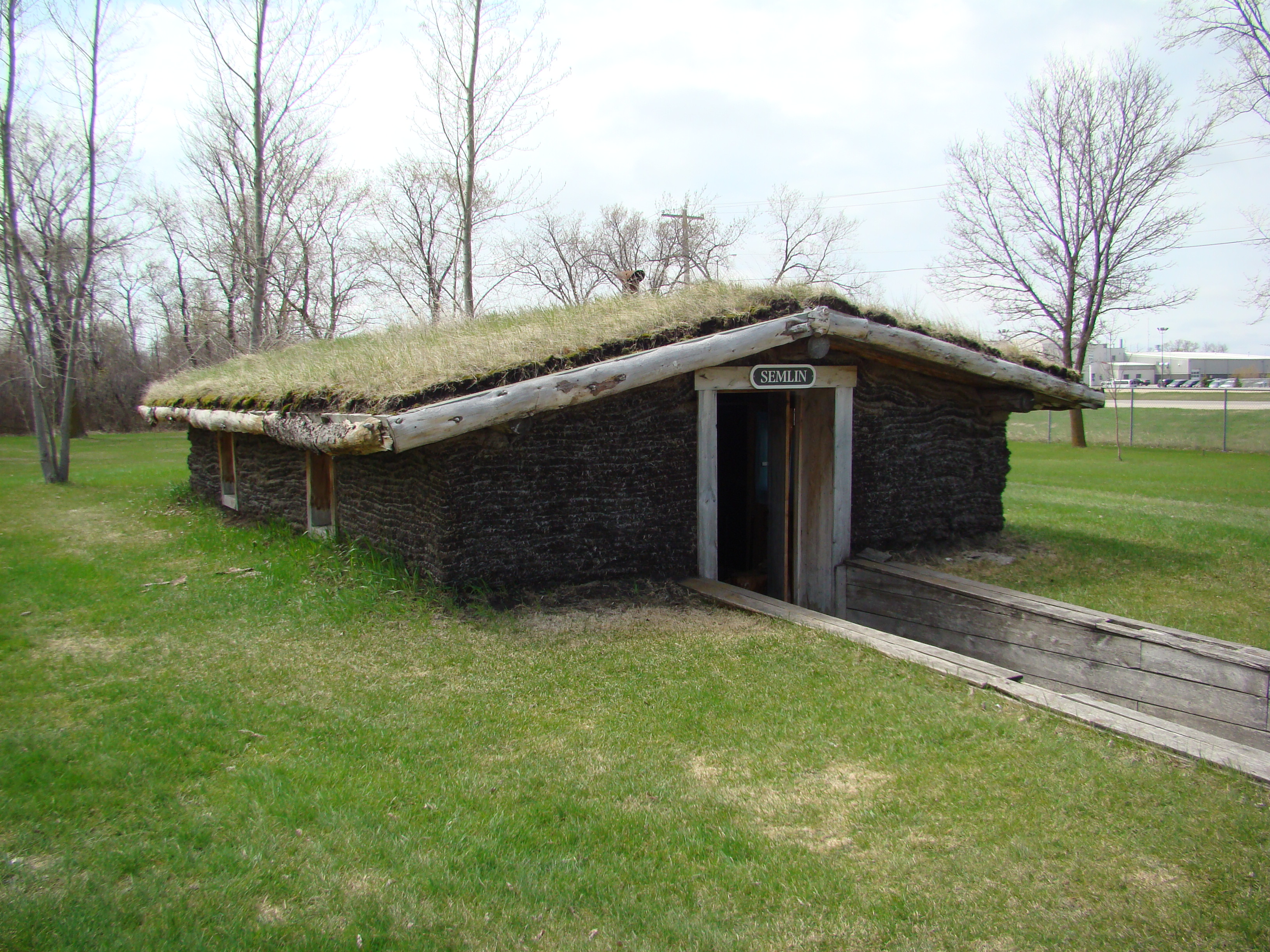
Semlin

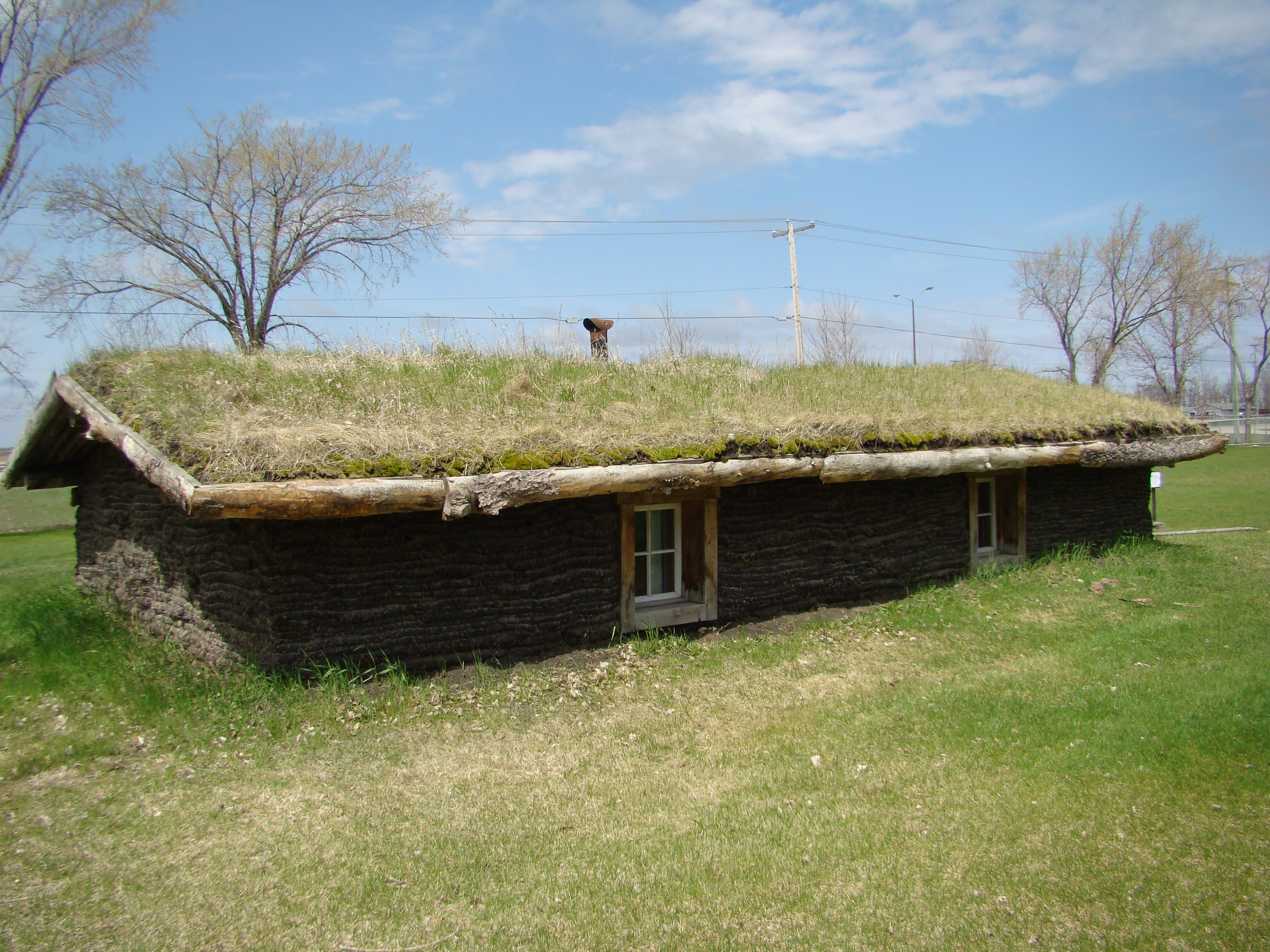
Semlin

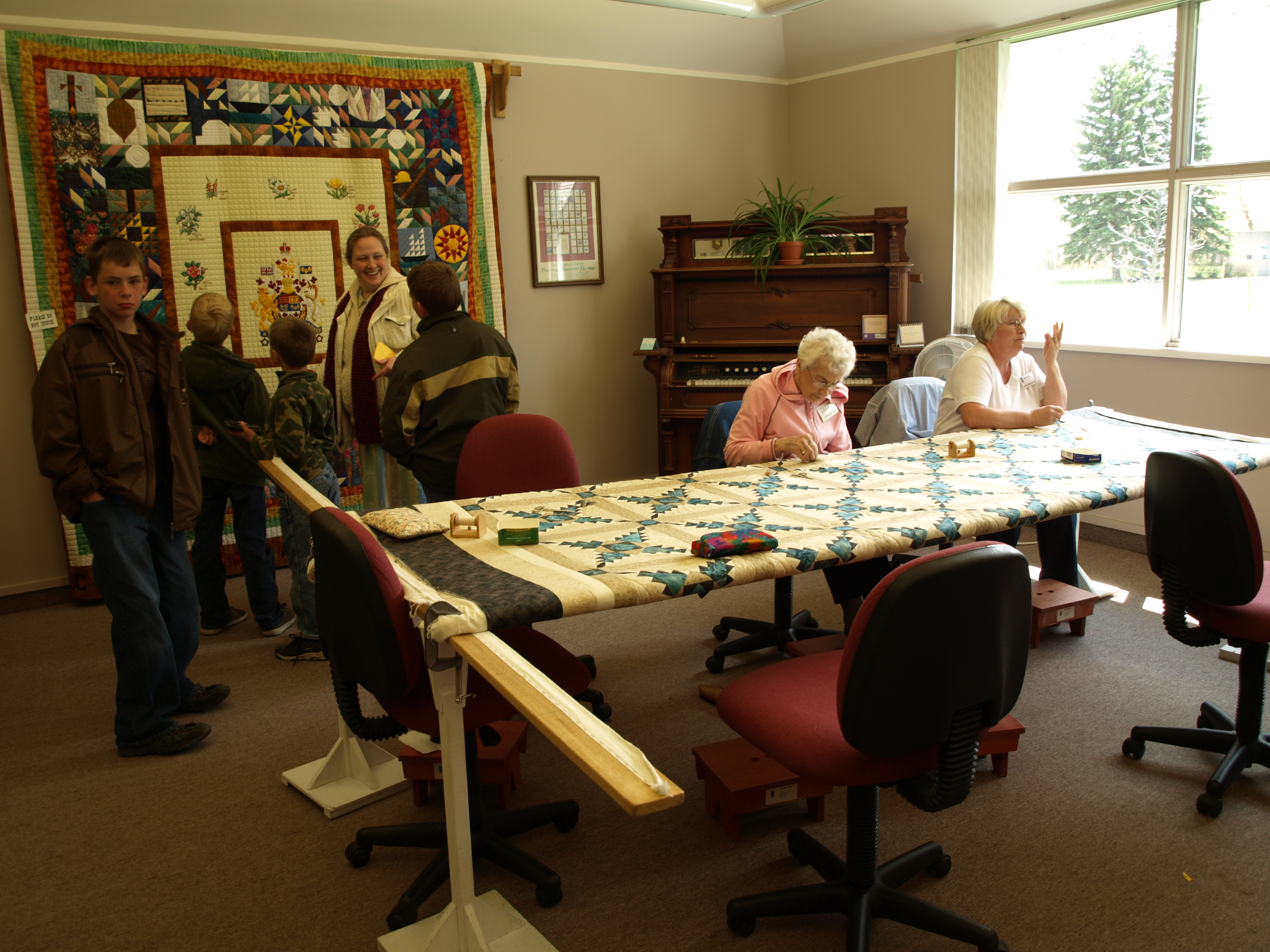
Quilt making

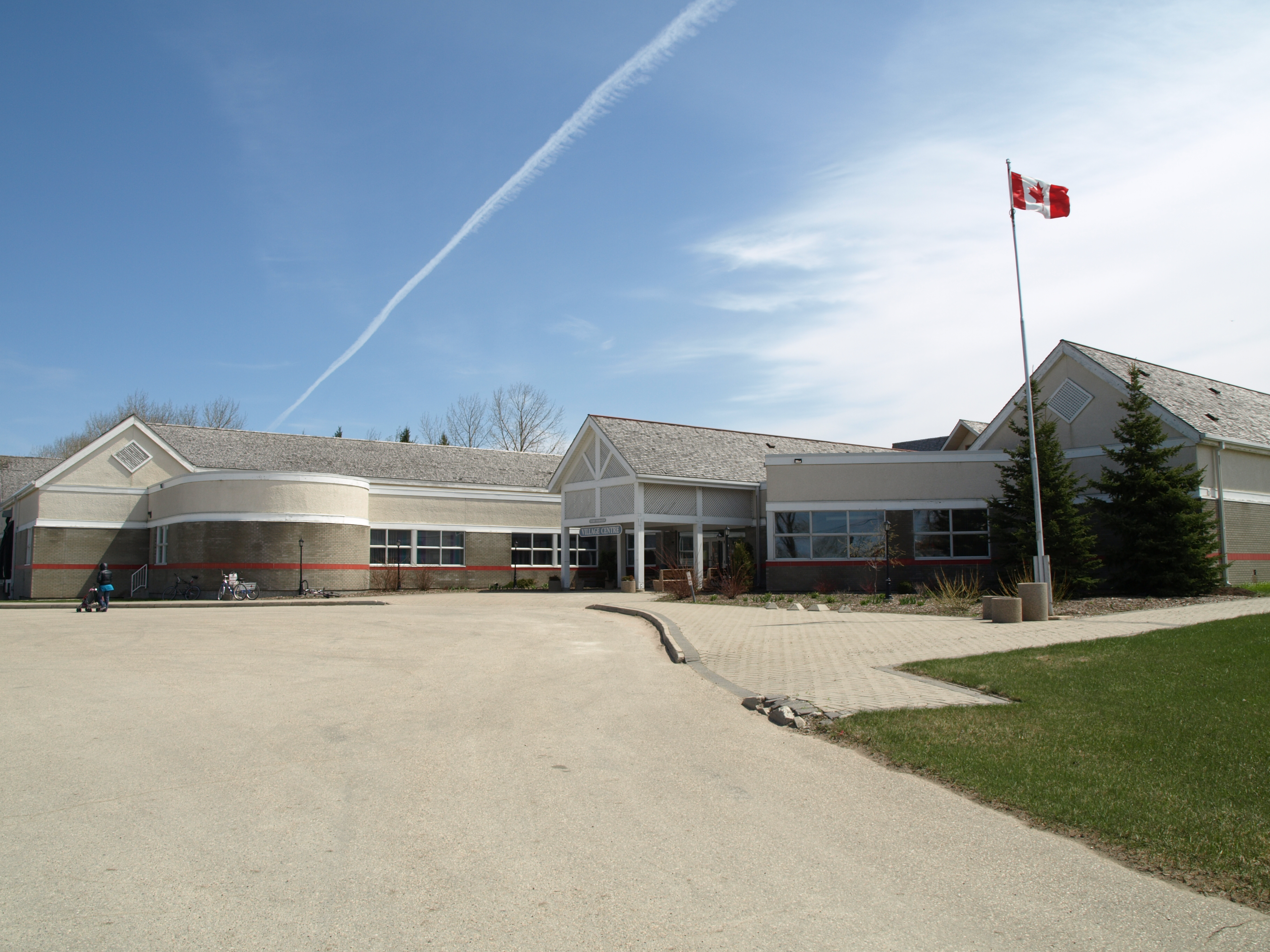
Entrance

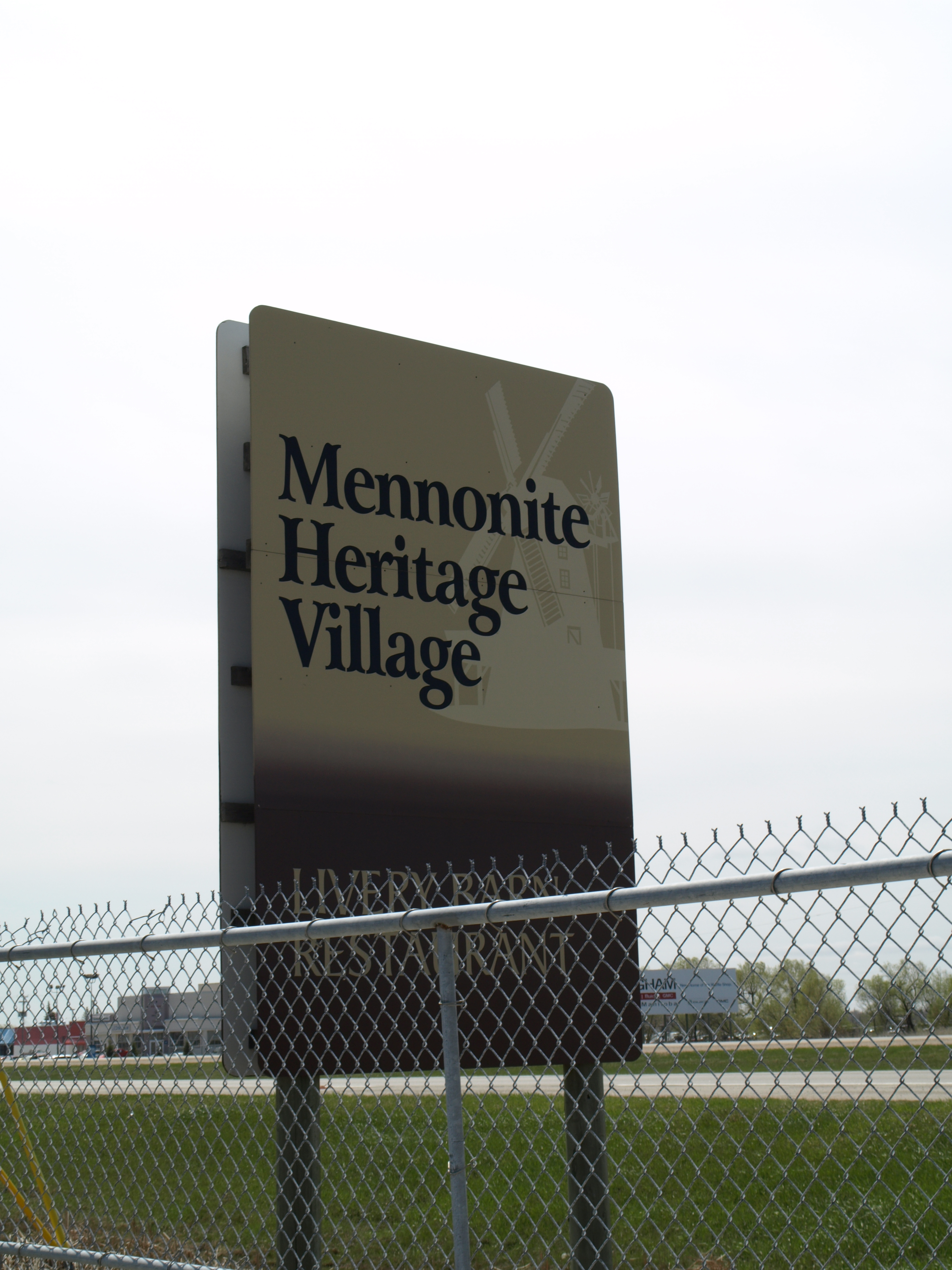

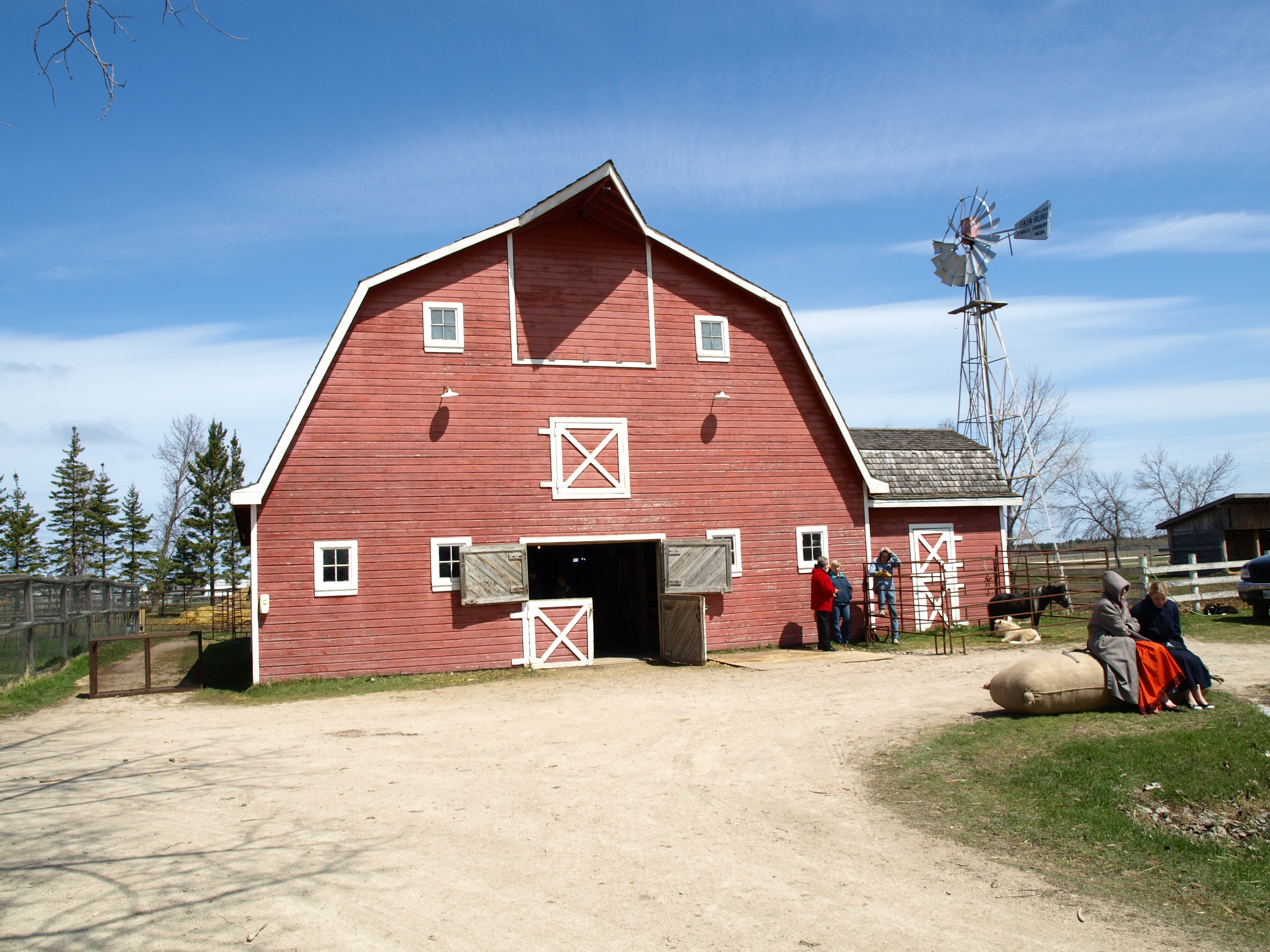
Barns

== See also ==
- Threshing stone
- Open-air museum
- East Reserve
- Mennonites
