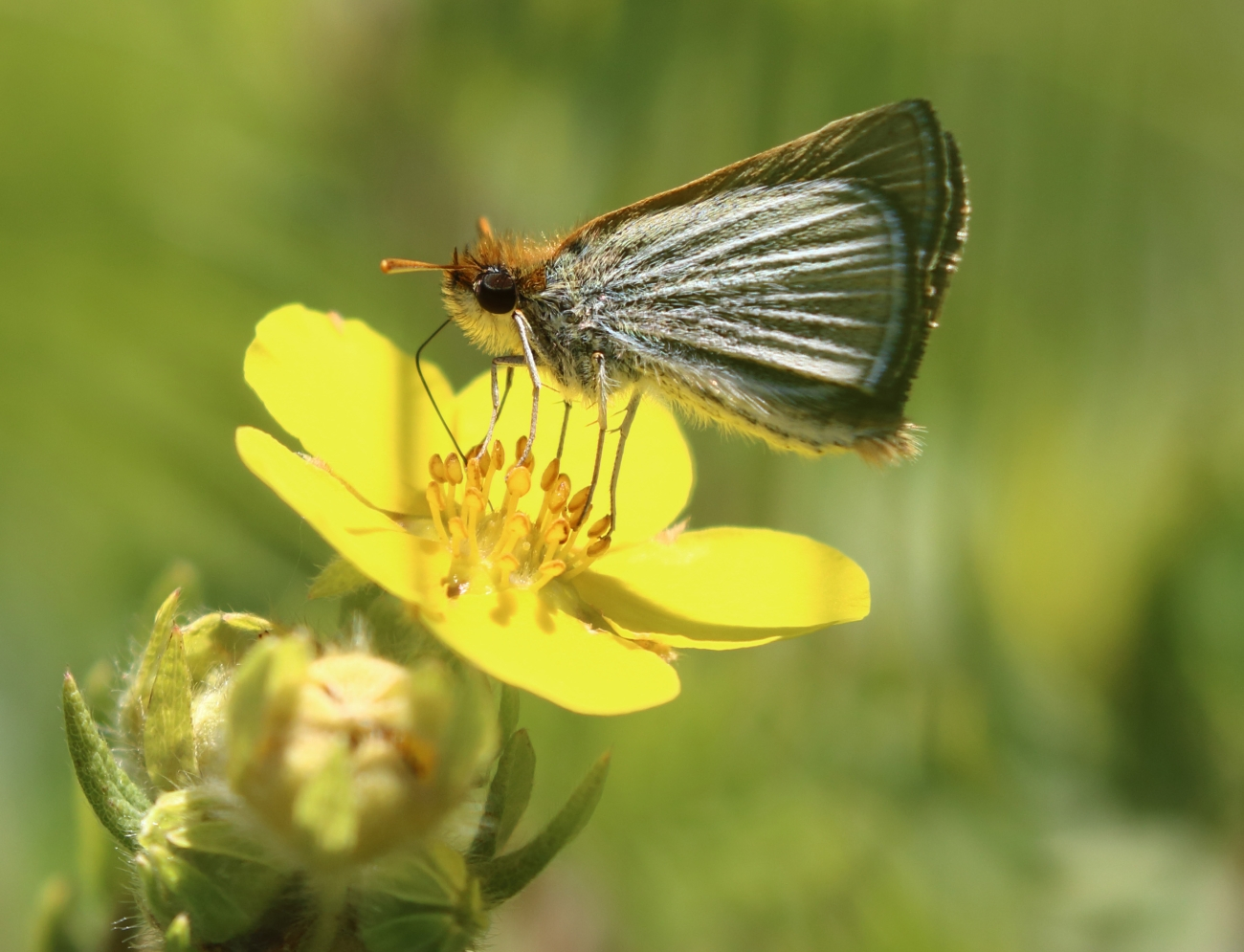

Conservation status
- Critically Endangered (IUCN 3.1)

- Critically Imperiled (NatureServe)

Scientific classification
- Kingdom: Animalia
- Phylum: Arthropoda
- Clade: Pancrustacea
- Class: Insecta
- Order: Lepidoptera
- Family: Hesperiidae
- Genus: Oarisma
- Species: O. poweshiek

Binomial name
- Oarisma poweshiek (Parker, 1870)

Synonyms
- Hesperia powesheik; Thymelicus powesheik

= Oarisma poweshiek =

Species of butterfly

Oarisma poweshiek, the Poweshiek skipperling, is a North American butterfly in the family Hesperiidae (skippers), subfamily Hesperiinae (grass skippers). The range of this species in Canada is restricted to southeastern Manitoba, and in the United States it historically ranged from the Dakotas to the southern Lower Peninsula of Michigan.

== Description ==
Coloured dark brown on the upperside with an orange along the costa. The underside of the hindwings are dark grey with white veins.

Wingspan is from 24 to 30 mm.

== Behaviour ==
The Poweshiek skipperling emerges in late June or early July and exists in the adult form for approximately a two-week period. During this time the skipperling nectars on a suite of flowers, mates and lays eggs. The larvae feed on graminoid plant species that possibly vary throughout the distribution of this species.

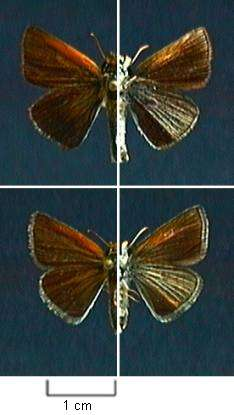

== Conservation status ==
The Poweshiek skipperling was a common prairie butterfly prior to 2005, but suffered a population crash between 2005 and 2015. The Poweshiek skipperling has a NatureServe ranking of G1 or critically imperiled. It is threatened by degradation and modification of its native prairie habitat by overgrazing, invasive species, and conversion to cropland. This species was awarded endangered status under the United States Endangered Species Act in 2014 after gaining candidate status in 2011. The Poweshiek skipperling was assessed as threatened by Committee on the Status of Endangered Wildlife in Canada (COSEWIC) in 2003, then, in 2005, the species was added to Schedule 1 with the status threatened under the Species at Risk Act (SARA), in Canada. In 2014, the species was reassessed as endangered by COSEWIC. In February 2019, the SARA status was changed to endangered.

In 2018, the Minnesota Zoo began efforts to rear them in captivity, for release in the wild. In 2022, the Minnesota Zoo released over 100 individuals in to the wild. In 2021, the John Ball Zoo in Michigan also began rearing the Poweshiek skipperling and has since released thousands of individuals into the wild.

The Assiniboine Park Zoo Conservancy in Canada has contributed to the species’ recovery through its Grassland Butterfly Conservation Program, releasing over 700 individuals, completing the first reintroduction at an extirpated site, improving egg-to-adult survival rates, and advancing research in collaboration with international partners.
