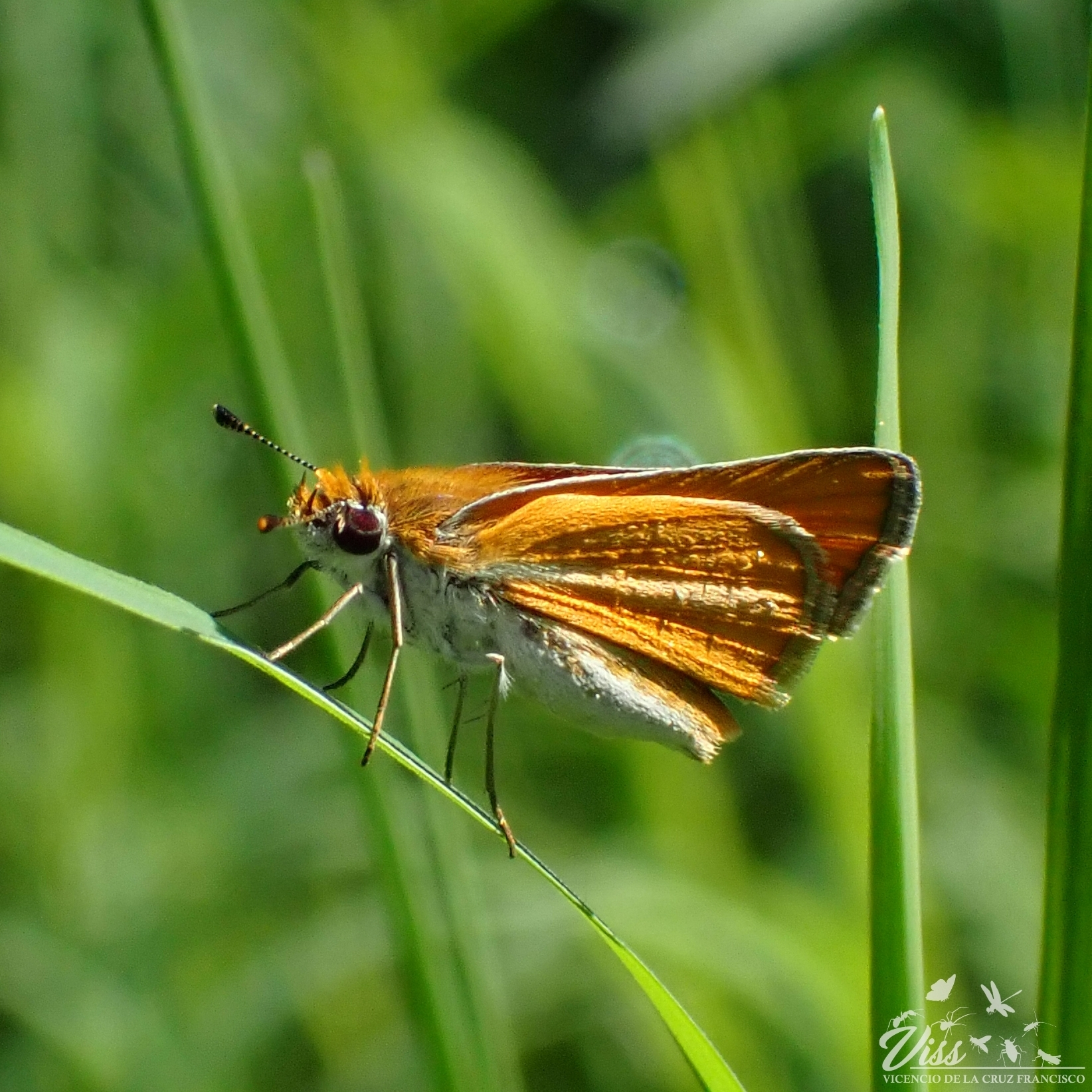
- Oarisma minima, México

Scientific classification
- Kingdom: Animalia
- Phylum: Arthropoda
- Clade: Pancrustacea
- Class: Insecta
- Order: Lepidoptera
- Family: Hesperiidae
- Subfamily: Hesperiinae
- Tribe: Hesperiini
- Subtribe: Thymelicina
- Genus: Oarisma; Scudder, 1872

Synonyms
- Copaeodes Speyer, 1877; Paradopaea Godman, 1900

= Oarisma =

Genus of butterflies

Oarisma is a genus of grass skippers in the butterfly family Hesperiidae. There are about 14 described species in Oarisma, found in the Americas.

In 2019, the Taxonomic Report of the International Lepidoptera Survey published information placing species of the genus Copaeodes into Oarisma. These species are still sometimes treated as members of the (former) genus Copaeodes.

== Species ==
These 14 species belong to the genus Oarisma:

- Oarisma aurantiaca (Hewitson, 1868) (orange skipperling) (United States south to Guatemala)
- Oarisma boeta Hewitson, 1870 (South America)
- Oarisma bruneri Bell, 1959 (Cuba)
- Oarisma castanea Mielke, 1969 (Brazil)
- Oarisma edwardsii (W. Barnes, 1897) (Edwards's skipperling) (United States and Mexico)
- Oarisma eoa (anegada skipperling) (Virgin Islands)
- Oarisma era Dyar (gold-veined skipperling) (North America)
- Oarisma favor Evans, 1955 (Virgin Islands)
- Oarisma garita (Reakirt, 1866) (garita skipperling) (North America)
- Oarisma jean Evans, 1955 (South America)
- Oarisma minima (W. H. Edwards, 1870) (southern skipperling) (southern United States south to Costa Rica)
- Oarisma nanus Herrich-Schäffer, 1865 (nanus skipperling) (Cuba)
- Oarisma poweshiek (Parker, 1870) (Poweshiek skipperling) (North America)
- Oarisma stillmani (Bell & Comstock, 1948) (Stillman's skipperling) (Hispaniola)

== Gallery ==
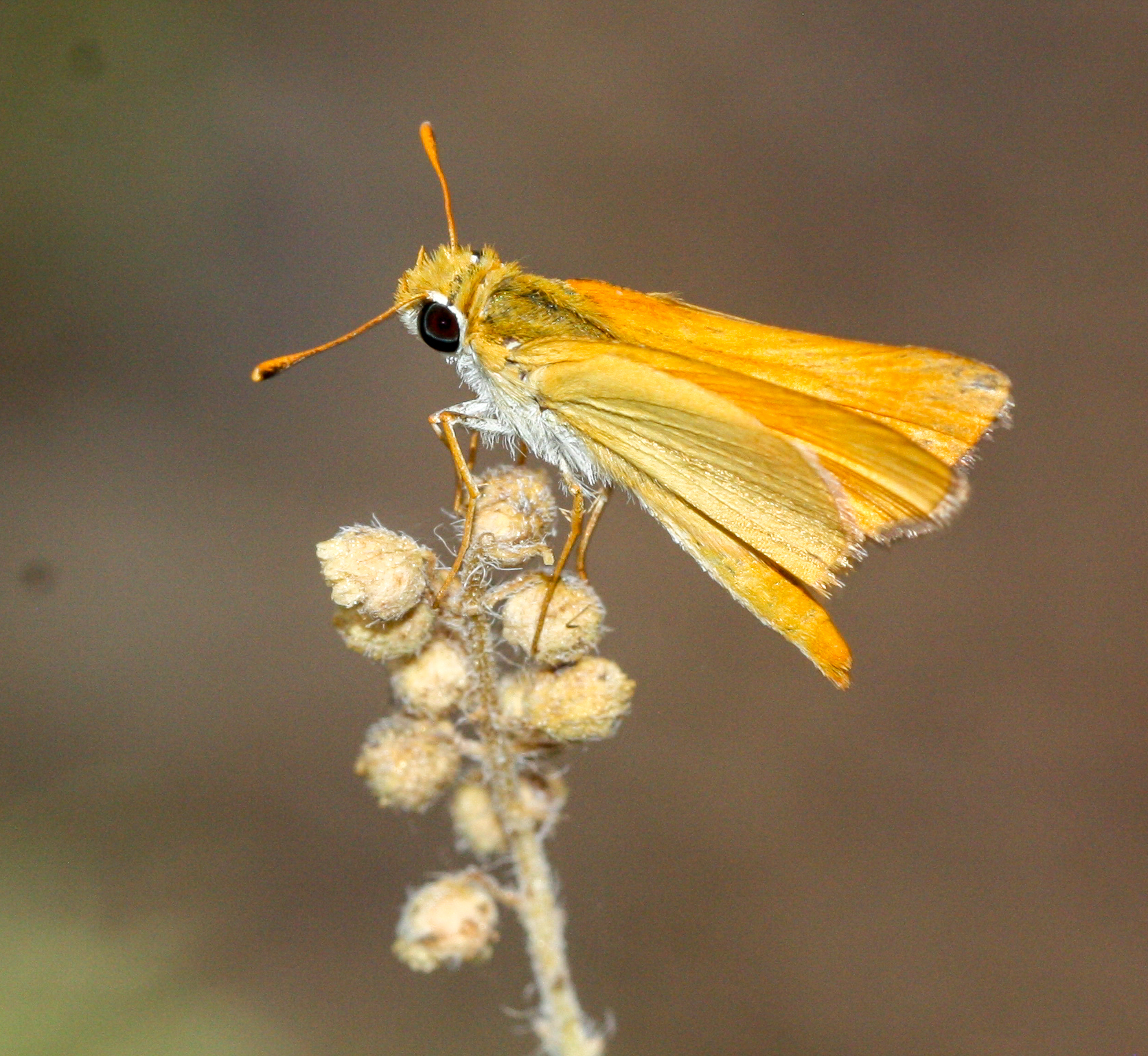
Oarisma aurantiaca, Arizona

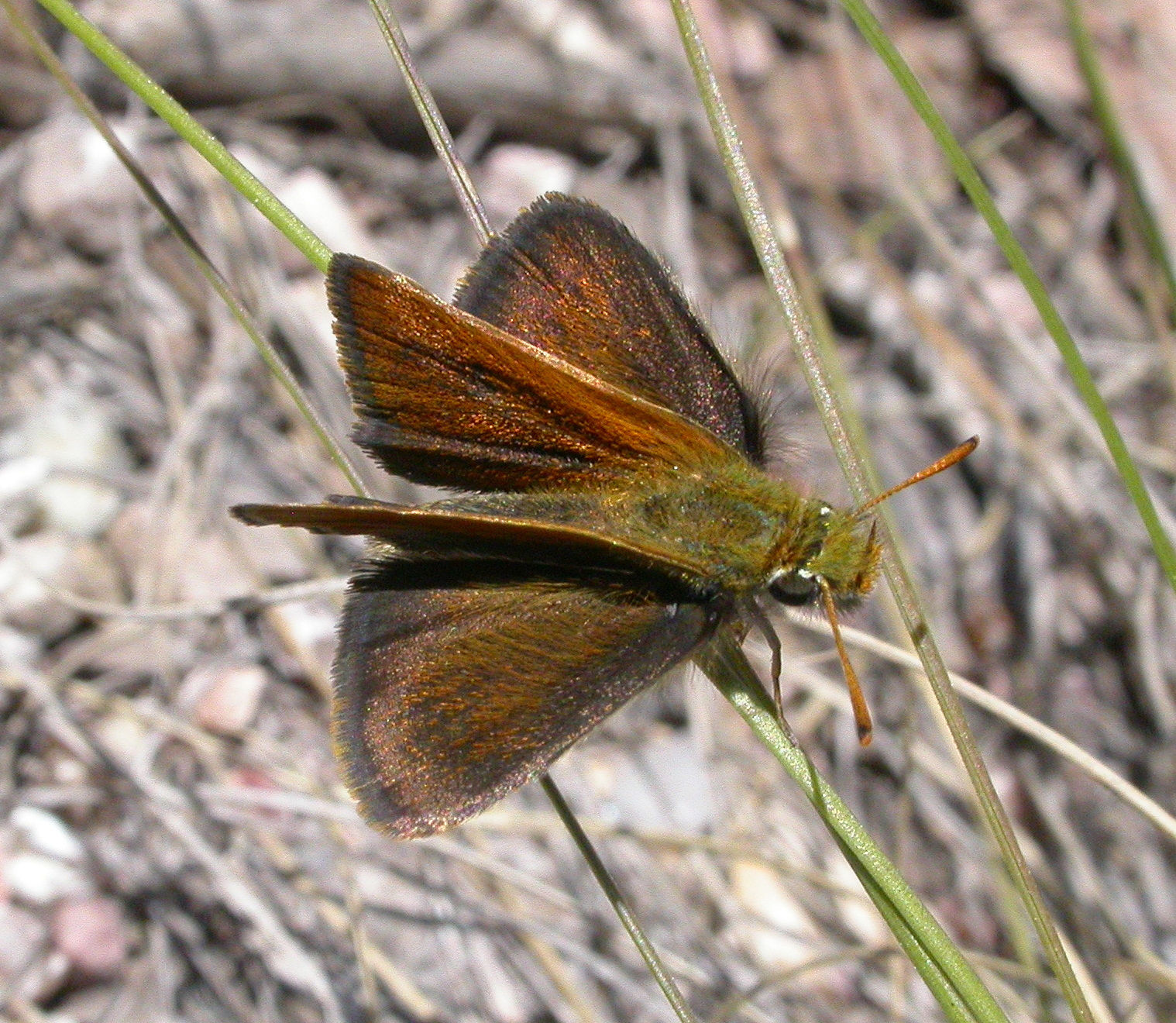
Oarisma garita, South Dakota

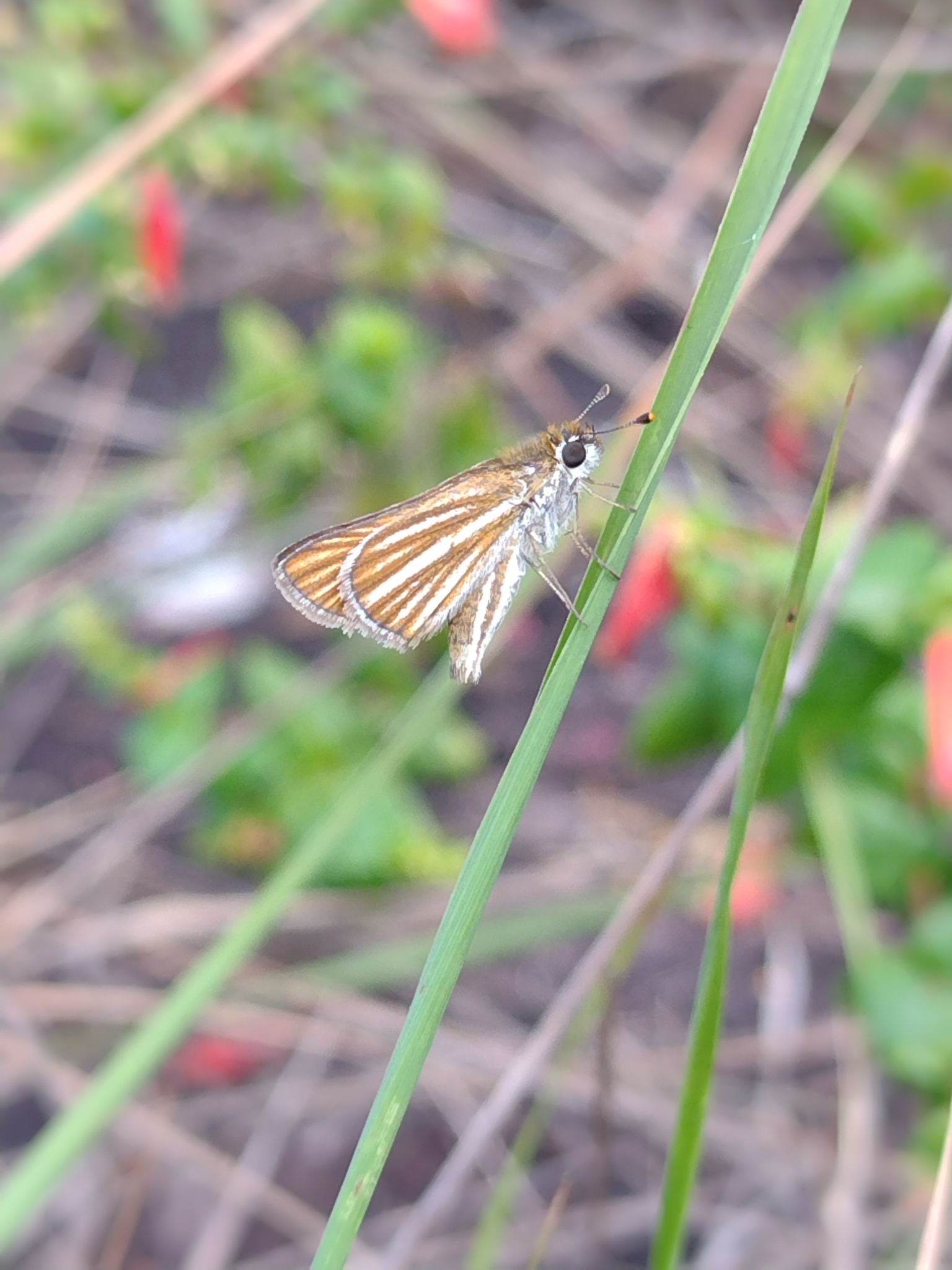
Oarisma jean, Brasil

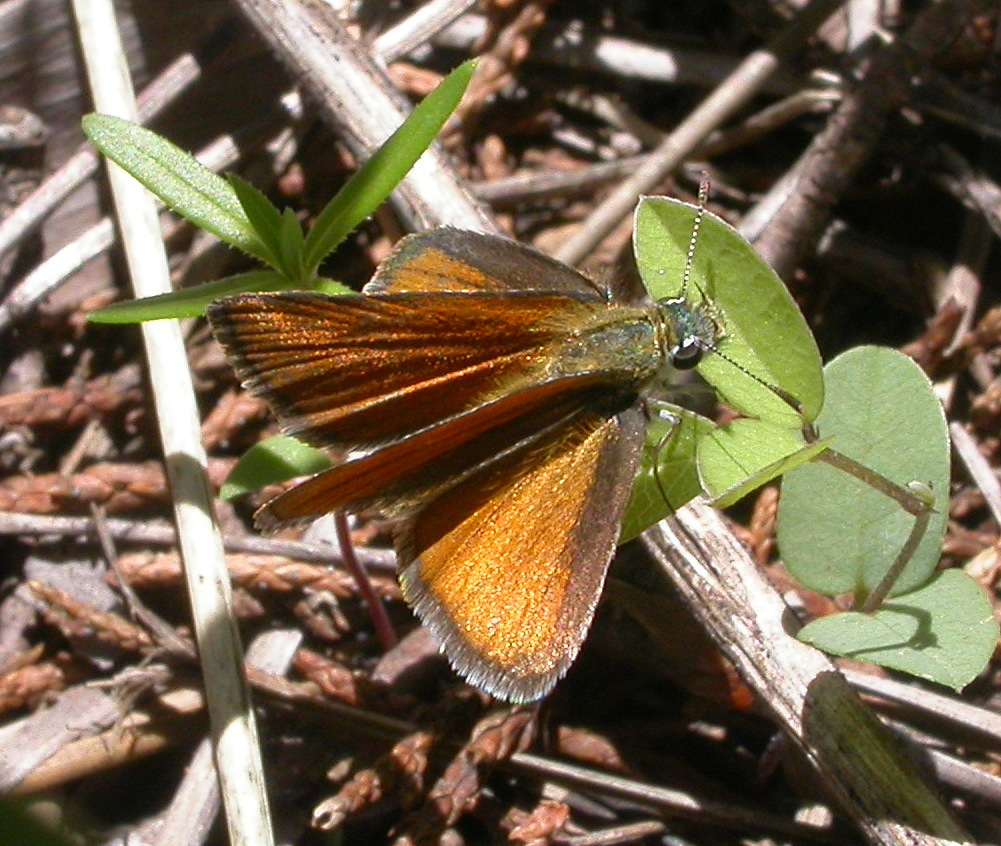
Oarisma edwardsii, Arizona

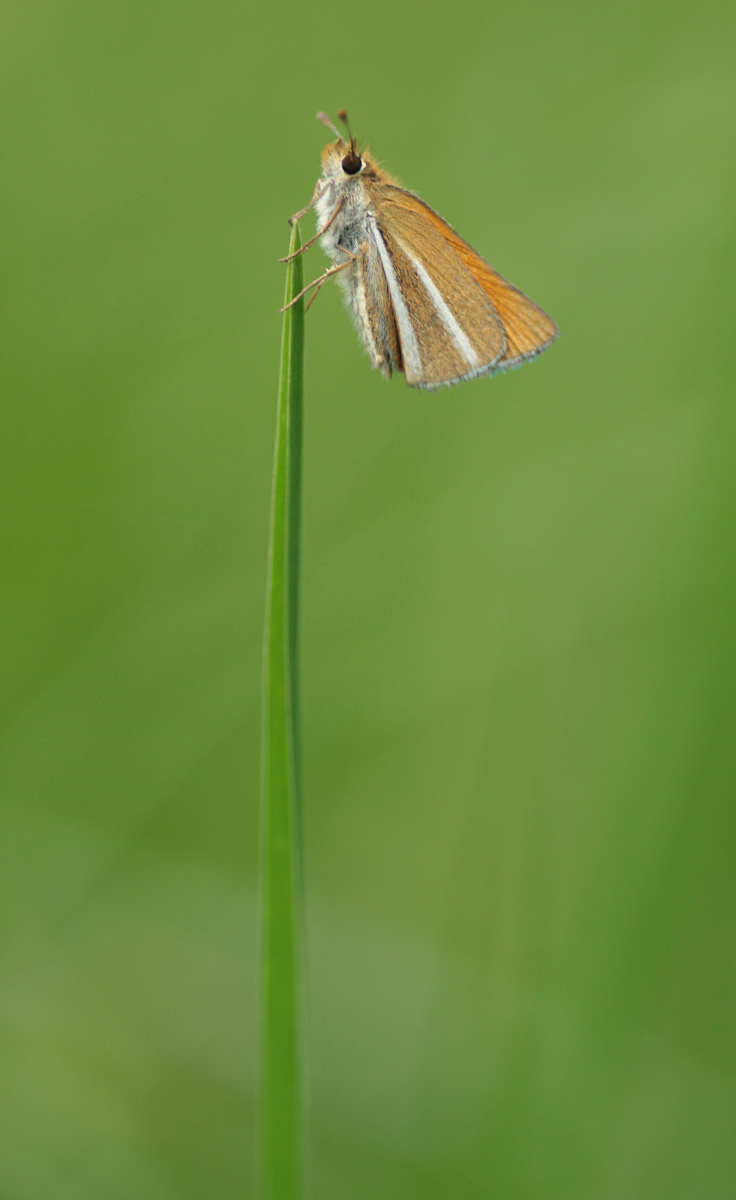
Oarisma boeta, Ecuador
