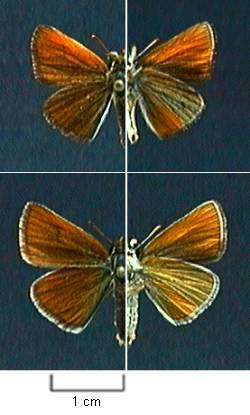

Conservation status
- Apparently Secure (NatureServe)

Scientific classification
- Kingdom: Animalia
- Phylum: Arthropoda
- Class: Insecta
- Order: Lepidoptera
- Family: Hesperiidae
- Genus: Oarisma
- Species: O. garita

Binomial name
- Oarisma garita (Reakirt, 1866)

Subspecies
- Oarisma garita garita; Oarisma garita calega (Godman, 1900)

Synonyms
- Hesperia garita

= Oarisma garita =

Species of butterfly

Oarisma garita, the Garita skipperling, western skipperling or Garita skipper, is a North American butterfly in the family Hesperiidae (skippers), subfamily Hesperiinae (grass skippers). This skipper ranges southeastern Manitoba to British Columbia and south through the American Midwest as far south as Mexico. Its habitats include dry or moist prairies, open woodlands, and limestone outcrops.

== Description ==
Colored orange brown on the upperside. The underside of the forewings are also orange but hindwings are dark gray with orange inner margins and gray-white veins.

Wingspan is from 20 to 25 mm.

== Behavior ==
Flies from mid-June through mid-July. Larvae feed on Sitanion, Blephanoneuron, Stipa, Poa and Bouteloua. Adults feed on flower nectar.
