= Jacob Hoeppner =

Jacob Hoeppner (or Jakob Höppner) (1748–1826) was one of two delegates selected by the Mennonite community in Danzig, Prussia, to travel to South Russia and evaluate land along the Dnieper River near Chortitza as a possible settlement. The Mennonites were recruited by Empress Catherine II the Great to settle on territory recently won from the Sultan of the Ottoman Empire. The entire Ukraine had a population of three million at most. In order to settle this empty territory, colonists from western Europe were invited to come to Russia.

Russian colonization agents advertised the availability of crown lands to people throughout Europe. One of these was Georg von Trappe, who visited the Mennonites of Danzig in 1786. The Mennonite congregations elected to send Hoeppner and Johann Bartsch, who von Trappe arranged to send to Russia at government expense. They departed in the fall of 1786, sailing first to Riga, then travelling cross country, arriving at the Dnieper in late November. From here they sailed down the river looking for a suitable site. They met Potemkin at Kremenchuk and were presented to Catherine in May, as she was inspecting her new territories. They found a suitable settlement location, then returned home by way of Saint Petersburg, where they met with Crown Prince Paul, who confirmed the promises made by von Trappe. Their return to Danzig was delayed for several months because Hoeppner broke his leg.

== Russia ==
The following year, the 228 of the poorest families from the Mennonite community of Danzig made the long harrowing trip from Prussia to the promised tract of land in Russia under the leadership of Hoeppner and Bartsch. The journey from Danzig to Riga was 300 miles by boat on the Baltic Sea, then 900 miles by caravan to Chortitza. The difficulty of pioneering on the steppe was compounded the disappearance of personal property and government building materials en route to the settlement. While most families survived by building crude shelters, Hoeppner and Bartsch were able to erect substantial dwellings. The two men were accused of keeping government money intended for community use. Both were excommunicated from the church. Hoeppner was turned over to the Russian government on trumped up charges and spent almost a year in jail. Eventually, Hoeppner and his family became citizens of nearby Alexandrovsk, settled on the Isle of Chortitza on the Dnieper River and became an active part of the Russian Mennonites life in the new colony, joining another Mennonite congregation.

Hoeppner made arrangements to be buried on his own estate instead of the Mennonite cemetery among the people who had caused so many problems for him. In 1889 a centennial monument celebrating the original settlement was placed at his gravesite by the great-grandchildren of the colonists who had Hoeppner thrown in jail. The monument has since been moved to Mennonite Heritage Village in Steinbach, Manitoba.
