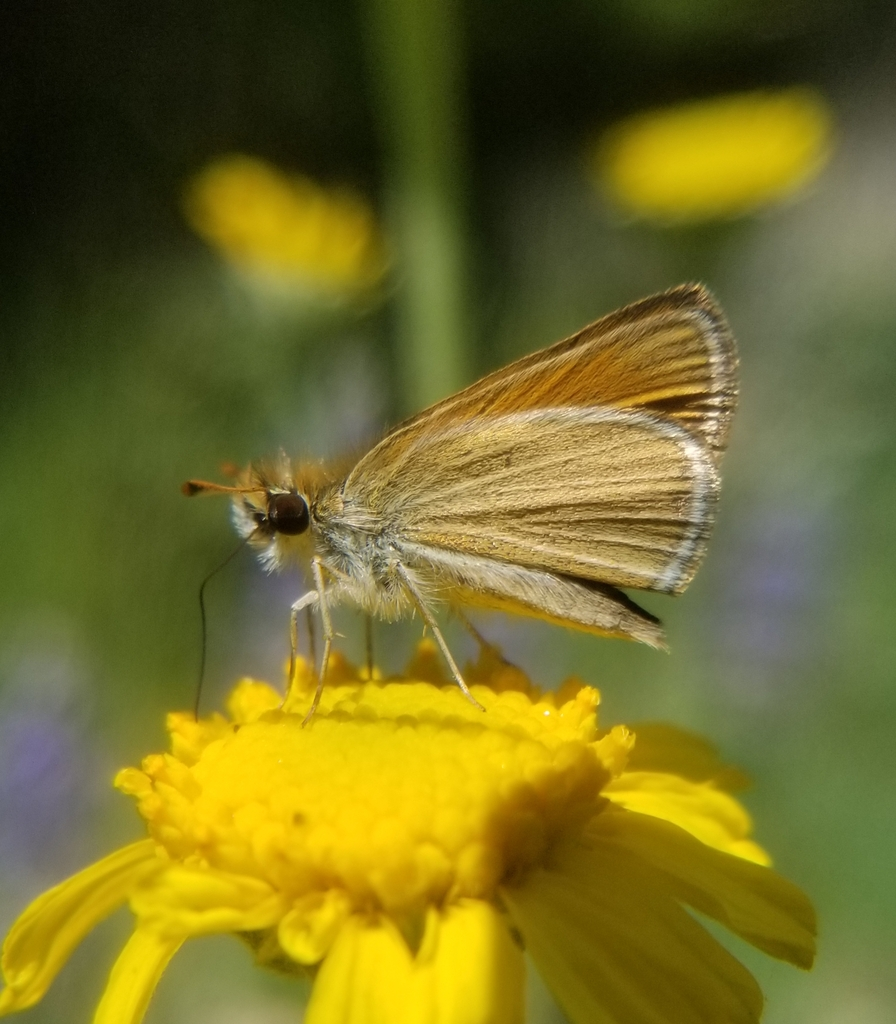

Conservation status
- Vulnerable (NatureServe)

Scientific classification
- Kingdom: Animalia
- Phylum: Arthropoda
- Class: Insecta
- Order: Lepidoptera
- Family: Hesperiidae
- Genus: Oarisma
- Species: O. edwardsii

Binomial name
- Oarisma edwardsii (Barnes, 1897)

= Oarisma edwardsii =

Species of butterfly

Oarisma edwardsii, or Edwards's skipperling, is a species of grass skipper in the family of butterflies known as Hesperiidae. It was first described by William Barnes in 1897 and it is found in Central and North America.

The MONA or Hodges number for Oarisma edwardsii is 4008.

== Description ==
The fringes of the wings are white-tipped. The upperside is brownish orange, and the forewing cell is brighter. The underside of the forewing is brownish orange with black at the lower margin. The underside of the hindwing is yellowish with orange on the lower margin. The wingspan ranges from 7/8 to 1 1/8 inches or 2.2 to 2.9 centimeters.
