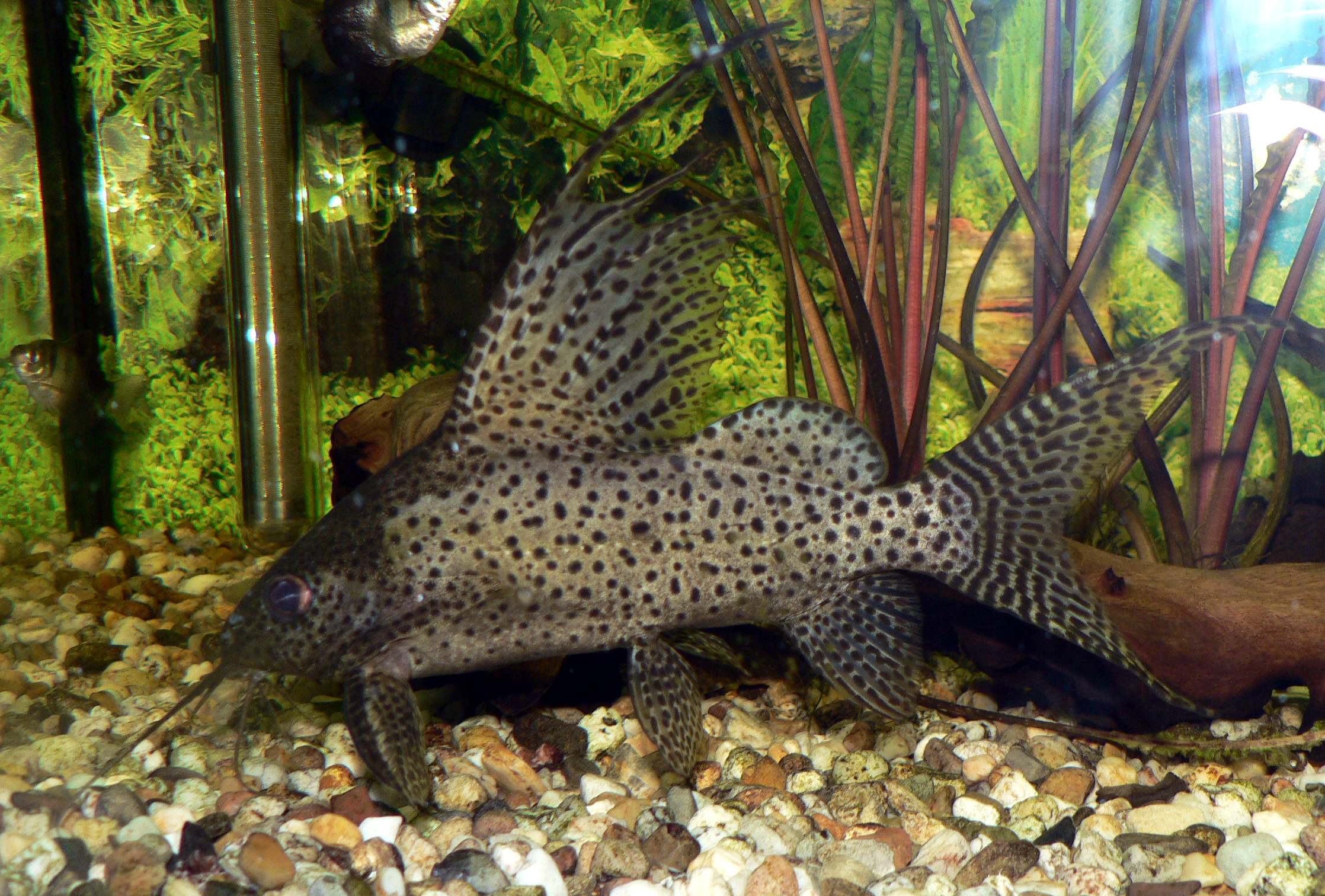

Conservation status
- Least Concern (IUCN 3.1)

Scientific classification
- Domain: Eukaryota
- Kingdom: Animalia
- Phylum: Chordata
- Class: Actinopterygii
- Order: Siluriformes
- Family: Mochokidae
- Genus: Synodontis
- Species: S. eupterus

Binomial name
- Synodontis eupterus Boulenger, 1901

= Featherfin squeaker =

Species of fish

The featherfin squeaker (Synodontis eupterus) or featherfin synodontis is a species of Synodontis catfish. This species is found in the basins of the White Nile, Volta and Niger Rivers and the Chad Basin. Featherfin squeakers are called such due to their ability to make noises to communicate with one another and also for their high feather-like fin which is valued by many hobbyists. Wild specimens can grow to a length of 30.0 centimetres (11.8 in) SL.

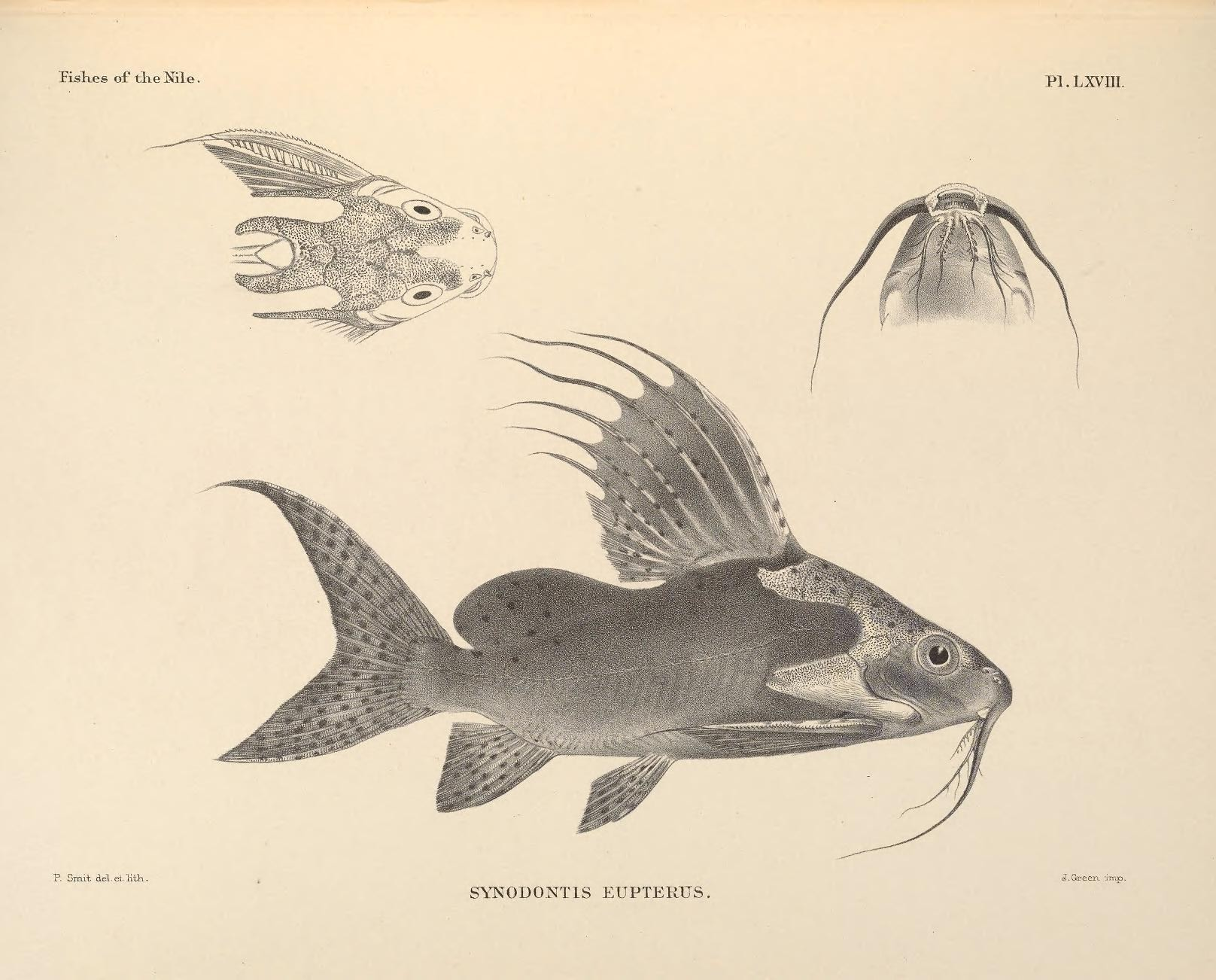
Detailed illustration for S. eupterus.
