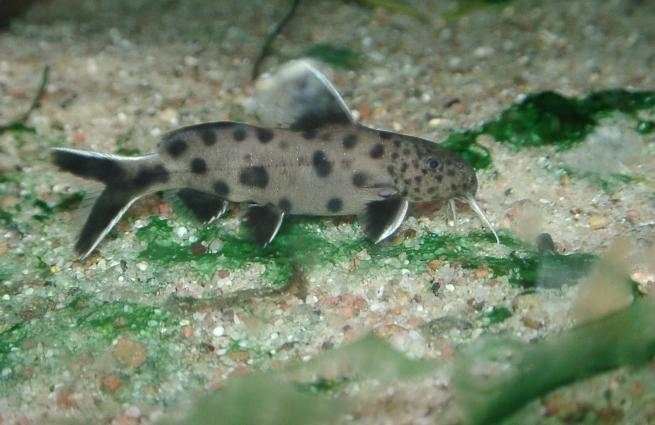

Conservation status
- Least Concern (IUCN 3.1)

Scientific classification
- Kingdom: Animalia
- Phylum: Chordata
- Class: Actinopterygii
- Division: Teleostei
- Order: Siluriformes
- Family: Mochokidae
- Genus: Synodontis
- Species: S. petricola

Binomial name
- Synodontis petricola Matthes, 1959

= Synodontis petricola =

Species of fish

Synodontis petricola, sometimes known as the pygmy leopard catfish, (Note: FishBase lists its common name as the "cuckoo catfish", but the true cuckoo catfish, which is a brood parasite of cichlids, is Synodontis multipunctatus.) is a species of upside-down catfish endemic to Burundi, Zambia, the Democratic Republic of the Congo, and Tanzania where it is only known from Lake Tanganyika. It was first described by Belgian ichthyologist Hubert Matthes in 1959. The species name "petricola" is derived from a combination of the Latin petra, meaning stone or rock, and the Latin cola, meaning inhabitant. This refers to the rocky environment where this species is found.

== Description ==
Like all members of the genus Synodontis, S. petricola has a strong, bony head capsule that extends back as far as the first spine of the dorsal fin. The head is about 3/10 of the standard length of the fish. The head contains a distinct narrow, bony external protrusion called a humeral process. The shape and size of the humeral process helps to identify the species. In S. petricola, the humeral process is triangular, rough, and is covered in many small, thin papillae. The bottom edge has a poorly defined ridge on the bottom edge, and the top edge is convex. The humeral process ends in a sharp point. It is about 1/2 of the length of the head. The diameter of the eye is about 1/9 of the length of the head.

The fish has three pairs of barbels. The maxillary barbels are on located on the upper jaw, and two pairs of mandibular barbels are on the lower jaw. The maxillary barbel has a narrow membrane attached near the base and is straight without any branches. It extends at least as far as the base of the pectoral spine, about 3/4 of the length of the head. The outer pair of mandibular barbels extends just past the start of the pectoral girdle, about 1/2 of the length of the head, and contains four to seven simple branches, usually without any secondary branches. The inner pair of mandibular barbels is about 1/3 to 2/3 as long as the outer pair, about 1/4 of the length of the head, with four to six branches, with many secondary branches present.

The skin of S. petricola has a large number of tiny vertical skin folds. The exact purpose of the skin folds is not known, but is a characteristic of the species of Synodontis that are endemic to Lake Tanganyika. External granular papilla are present on the head, but not the body.

The front edges of the dorsal fins and the pectoral fins of Synodontis species are hardened into stiff spines. In S. petricola, the spine of the dorsal fin is long, about 3/4 as long as the head, is slightly curved, is smooth on the front and with fine serrations the back, and ends with short, white filament. The remaining portion of the dorsal fin is made up of seven dark branching rays. The spine of the pectoral fin is slightly curved, roughly as long as the dorsal fin spine, with large serrations on the back side. The pectoral spine ends in short, white filament. The rest of the pectoral fins are made up of eight to nine branching rays. The adipose fin is large, does not contain any rays, and has a convex shape. The pelvic fin contains one unbranched and six branched rays. The front edge of the pelvic fin is vertically aligned midway between with the back edge of the dorsal fin and the front edge of the adipose fin. The anal fin contains three to four unbranched and seven to nine branched rays; it is vertically aligned with the center of the adipose fin. The tail, or caudal fin, is forked, with rounded lobes, and contains eight rays on the upper lobe, nine rays on the lower lobe.

The mouth of the fish faces downward and has wide lips that contain papilla. All members of Synodontis have a structure called a premaxillary toothpad, which is located on the very front of the upper jaw of the mouth. This structure contains several rows of short, chisel-shaped teeth. In some species, this toothpad is made up of a large patch with several rows in a large cluster. In other species of Synodontis, this toothpad is clearly divided into two separate groups, separated by a thin band of skin that divides the toothpad. This character is used as a method of differentiating between to different but similar species of Synodontis. In S. petricola, the toothpad is interrupted, or clearly divided between the groups of teeth on the toothpad. On the lower jaw, or mandible, the teeth of Synodontis are attached to flexible, stalk-like structures and described as "s-shaped" or "hooked". The number of teeth on the mandible is used to differentiate between species; in S. petricola, there are 31 to 50 teeth on the mandible, arranged in a six short rows.

Some of the species of Synodontis have an opening or series of openings called the axillary pore. It is located on the side of the body below the humeral process and before the pectoral fin spine. The exact function of the port is not known to scientists, although its presence has been observed in seven other catfish genera. Fish in the genus Acrochordonichthys have been observed to secrete a mucus with toxic properties from their axillary pore, but there is no scientific consensus as to the exact purpose of the secretion or the pore. S. petricola has a small axillary pore just below the humeral process.

The back of the fish is yellowish to copper-brown and is covered with large, irregularly shaped black spots. In juveniles, these spots can appear larger and sometimes intersect. The underside of the fish is lighter, with small, irregularly shaped spots. Most of the species of Synodontis of Lake Tanganyika have a recognizable pattern consisting of dark triangles at the bases of all of the rayed fins, present in S. petricola, and the back edges of the fins are white in color. The caudal fin has a black bar that runs from the base of each lobe to the top of the fin. The barbels are white.

The maximum standard length of all known specimens is 11.5 centimetres (4.5 in) and a total length of 13.5 centimetres (5.3 in). In general in Synodontis species, females tend to be slightly larger than males of the same age.

== Habitat and behavior ==
In the wild, the species is endemic to Lake Tanganyika, which has a temperature range of 23 to 26 °C (73 to 79 °F), and an approximate pH of 8.5 – 9, and dH range of 4–15. It inhabits rocky shorelines in the littoral zone, to a maximum depth of 30 metres (98 ft).

Juveniles appear to be carnivorous, feeding on water mites, seed shrimp, and insect larvae. Adults are generalists, feeding on algae scraped from rocks as well as small invertebrates; a 2026 study found that their dietary proportion, in descending order, consists of sponges, algae, plant detritus, and small aquatic arthropods such as crustaceans.

The reproductive habits of most of the species of Synodontis are not known, beyond some instances of obtaining egg counts from gravid females. Spawning likely occurs during the flooding season between July and October, and pairs swim in unison during spawning. The growth rate is rapid in the first year, then slows down as the fish age.
