= Alexander J. Musgrove =

Scottish-born Canadian artist

Alexander Johnson Musgrove (1881–1952) was a Scottish-born Canadian artist.

== Life ==
He was born in Edinburgh, and studied at the Glasgow School of Art. Musgrove moved to Winnipeg, Manitoba, Canada, in 1913 to become Principal of the Winnipeg School of Art. Shortly after arriving, he gave a talk and said:

Canada. so far, has not a distinct school of painting...such a school...would possibly obtain its inspiration from the clear skies, the great plains, and the mountains of the west.

He left the position in 1921, when he opened the Western Art Academy. He founded the Winnipeg Sketch Club in 1914 and he helped to reinvigorate the Manitoba Society of Artists in 1925, being a regular exhibitor at its shows. He specialized in watercolours. He also taught and wrote frequently on art for local newspapers. After 1932, he served for many years as curator for the Winnipeg Art Gallery.

He helped found the Manitoba Society of Artists.

Musgrove died in Winnipeg. In 1986, a retrospective was held of his work.
