= Simeonie Amagoalik =

Canadian artist

- Born: May 1, 1933; Inukjuak, Northern Quebec
- Died: March 2, 2011 (aged 77)

Simeonie Amagoalik (May 1, 1933 – March 2, 2011) was an Inuk carver from Resolute, Nunavut, Canada.

== Career ==
Amagoalik was born May 1, 1933, in Inukjuak, Northern Quebec. He started carving at the age of 14 on soapstone and tusks after learning from an American working for the Hudson's Bay Company. In 1953, Amagoalik and his family along with 10 other Inuit families were sent to Resolute. He met his wife, Eetoolook, in 1963 when they were both being treated for tuberculosis.

Amagoalik was involved in the early negotiations of the Nunavut Land Claims Agreement. Along with Looty Pijamini in Grise Fiord, Nunavut, Amagoalik was commissioned by the Canadian government to build a monument to the High Arctic relocation which took place in 1955. Amagoalik's monument is located in Resolute.
