= Apapacho =

2019 Canadian drama film

- Film poster
- French: Apapacho, une caresse pour l'âme
- Directed by: Marquise Lepage
- Written by: Marquise Lepage
- Produced by: Marquise Lepage; Gloria Carrasco
- Starring: Laurence Leboeuf; Fanny Mallette
- Cinematography: Nathalie Moliavko-Visotzky
- Edited by: Dominique Champagne
- Music by: Pasatono Orquesta; Ruben Luengas; Charles Papasoff
- Production companies: Les Productions du Cerf-Volant; Producciones Cornamusa
- Distributed by: Axia Films
- Release date: October 18, 2019
- Running time: 89 minutes
- Country: Canada
- Languages: French; Spanish

Apapacho (French: Apapacho, une caresse pour l'âme, lit. 'Apapacho, a caress for the soul') is a Canadian drama film, directed by Marquise Lepage and released in 2019. The film centres on Karine (Laurence Leboeuf) and Estelle (Fanny Mallette), two sisters on a trip to Mexico to participate in a Day of the Dead ritual honoring and mourning the recent suicide of their sister Liliane (Eugénie Beaudry).

The film opened in theatres on October 18, 2019.
