= Marquise Lepage =

Canadian film director and screenwriter

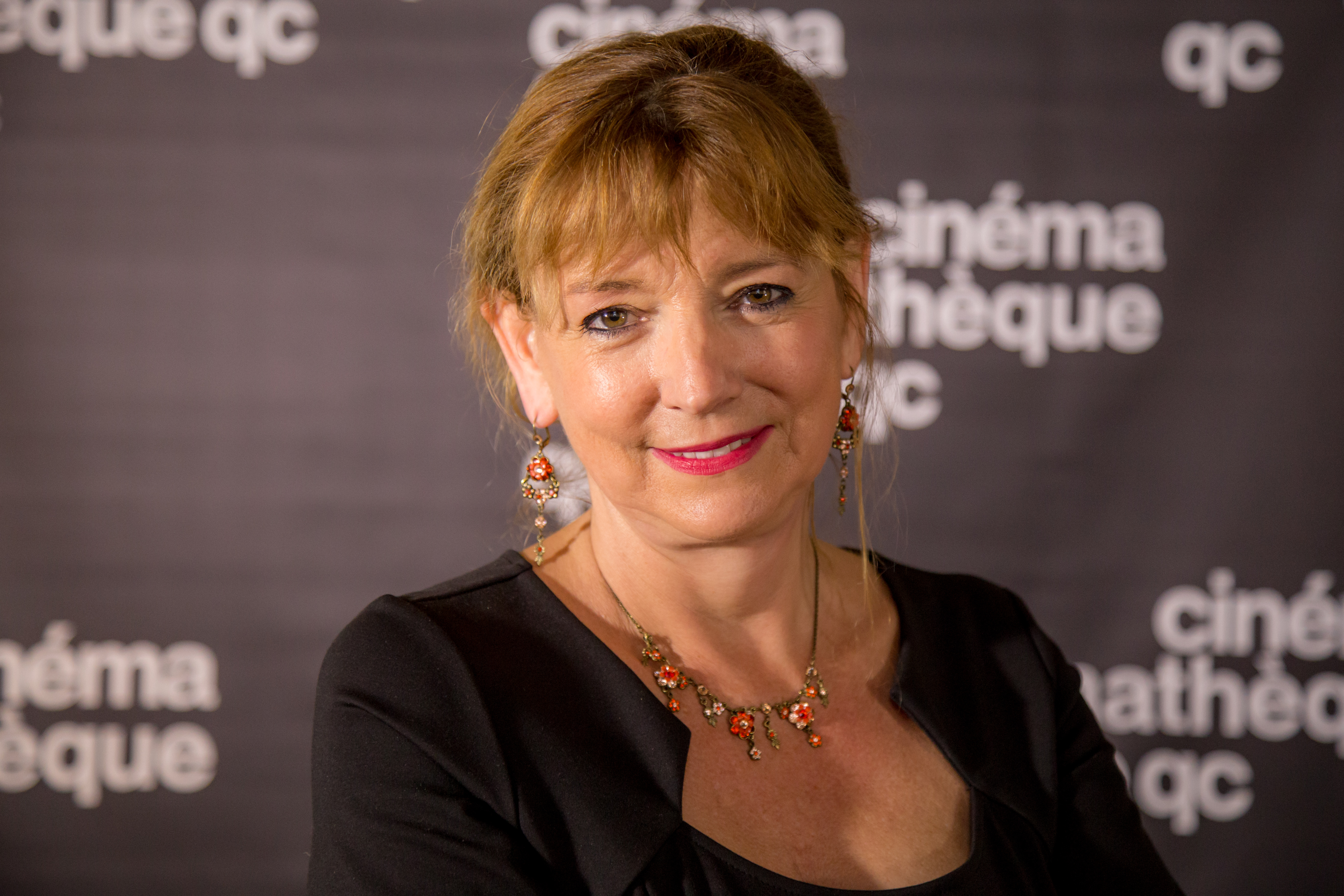
- Marquise Lepage at the cinémathèque québécoise in 2018
- Born: Marquise Lepage; September 6, 1959 (age 67); Chénéville, Quebec, Canada
- Occupations: Screenwriter, director, producer
- Years active: 1983–present
- Children: 2

Marquise Lepage (born September 6, 1959, in Chénéville, Quebec), is a Canadian (Québécoise) producer, screenwriter, and film and television director. She is best known for her 1987 feature Marie in the City (Marie s'en va-t-en ville), for which she received a nomination for Best Director at the 9th Genie Awards in 1988. She was also a nominee for Best Live Action Short Drama at the 14th Genie Awards in 1993 for Your Country, My Country (Dans ton pays). She was hired by the National Film Board (NFB) as a filmmaker in 1991. One of her first major projects for the NFB was The Lost Garden: The Life and Cinema of Alice Guy-Blaché, a documentary about female cinema pioneer Alice Guy-Blaché.

Her other credits have included the documentary films Un soleil entre deux nuages, Of Hopscotch and Little Girls, Ma vie, c'est le théâtre and Martha of the North, the feature films La fête des rois and Ce qu'il ne faut pas dire, and episodes of the television documentary series Canada: A People's History.

Lepage is known for directing fiction films and documentaries with a social twist. In an interview in 2015, she declared herself a feminist.

Lepage presided Quebec's film directors' association and Réalisatrices Équitables, a militant organization advocating equality between female and male filmmakers.

In 2008, she created her own production company, Les Productions du Cerf-Volant. The first fiction film she directed and produced for the company was One Night Stand: A Modern Love Story (Ce qu'il ne faut pas dire), which came out in theatres in May 2015.

Her most recent film, Apapacho, was released in 2019.

== Early life and education ==
Born in 1959, Lepage is the seventh child of a family of nine. The first film she saw as a child was Disney’s Bambi. After high school, she went on to study social sciences at Cégep de Saint-Jérôme. She had no family members working in the film business and had only basic knowledge of cinema when she decided to pursue her post-secondary studies in Communications at the Université du Québec à Montréal (UQÀM): "I knew nothing about the industry or anyone who had anything to do with cinema ... I walked into it with great naivety. But it served me. If I had seen the big picture and all that it takes to succeed, I might have been scared!" She went on to complete a Masters in Film Studies at Université de Montréal.

== Personal life ==
Lepage has two children, twins Alice and Jérémie, born in 1995. She named her daughter after Alice Guy-Blaché, about whom she made the documentary The Lost Garden (Le Jardin oublié) in 1995. Marquise has been living in the Villeray neighborhood of Montreal for over 20 years. In 2015, in order to finance the post-production of her latest feature film Ce qu’il ne faut pas dire (One Night Stand: A Modern Love Story), she decided to sell the house where she raised her children.

== Career ==
Lepage’s career began in 1983, when she became an associate for production company Les Productions du Lundi matin, which had notable Quebec film producer Marcel Simard at its head. Simard gave Lepage her first break when she directed Marie s’en va-t-en ville, her first feature film. The movie is about a love story between Marie, a thirteen year-old runaway, and Sarah, a prostitute in her forties. Lepage stayed with the Les Productions du Lundi matin until 1991.

In 1991, she was hired by the National Film Board of Canada (NFB) where she worked until 1994. There, she directed Your Country, My Country (Dans ton pays), a short film about two elementary-school classmates from different racial groups who become friends. She also directed her second feature film, a children’s movie titled La fête des rois, starring a young Marc-André Grondin.

Lepage was president of the Association des réalisateurs et réalisatrices du Québec (ARRQ) for two years, from 1990 to 1991.

From 2007 to 2012, she was president of Réalisatrices Équitables (RÉ), which she initiated with the help of other québécoises filmmakers. RÉ is "a non-profit organization founded in 2007. Its members are Québec female professional film directors".

Lepage founded Les Productions du Cerf-Volant in 2008. After producing several web projects and TV movies on her own, she wrote, directed, and produced One Night Stand: A Modern Love Story, a mix between a romantic comedy and a drama. It tells the story a young filmmaker in her thirties (played by Annick Fontaine) who has a heavy secret which complicates her already unstable love life. The film was produced independently, without the help of Canadian funding institutions. Some of the funds were raised through a crowdfunding campaign on Indiegogo. The initial goal was $15,000 but she raised $16,780 in two months. The film was released on May 29th, 2016 in two theatres, one in Montreal and another in Quebec City. It remained in theatres for two weeks and was ranked 18th among 32 other Quebec films in terms of admissions.

Marquise is currently working on a new fiction film, titled Apapacho, a Spanish word meaning "cuddle". The project will be a co-production between Canada and Mexico and the filming will take place in Quebec and in a small village in Mexico. Lepage has already received some financing from institutions in both countries and she is currently working on the screenplay. The film will tell the story of two sisters who travel to Mexico together following their other sister's death. It is set to star Mexican actress Sofía Espinosa and three actresses from Quebec which have yet to be cast.

== Filmmaking style and work philosophy ==
Lepage has written, directed, and produced documentaries and fiction films in various formats (feature-length, shorts, etc.): "When asked why she does both (fiction and documentary), she answers jokingly that she still does not know what she will do when she grows up."

Interviewed about her preference for screenwriting or directing, Lepage answers:

"These crafts are complementary but I like screenwriting because it is a painstaking task, which is done alone. On the other hand, directing is like a big party full of people. And filming is not always carried out in ideal conditions. We don't always have time to think."

Lepage says she loves working with the same collaborators over and over: "From one time to the next, we learn to know each other, to understand each other, and often even to love each other. What happens on a film set is very special."

A perpetual issue explored in Lepage's works, both documentaries and fictions, is childhood and injustices affecting children. She received the Golden Sheaf Award for Best Social Documentary for Of Hopscotch and Little Girls (Des marelles et des petites filles) in 2000, a movie which tells the story of girls around the world who suffer from poverty, forced labour or sexual abuse.

Lepage is preoccupied with discrimination made against women, but also with the underrepresentation of women in the film industry: "The imagination and creativity of women are not exploited enough on screen. It seems to me that a gap that needs to be filled." Her concerns were at the basis of her documentary The Lost Garden (Le Jardin oublié) about French-American filmmaker Alice Guy-Blaché who lived from 1873 to 1968 and directed over 1,000 films but was forgotten by history. The film won Best Auteur Documentary at the Gémeaux Awards in 1996.

Lepage's preoccupation with social injustices was reflected in her 2009 feature documentary Martha of the North (Martha qui vient du froid). It tells the story of Martha Flaherty, granddaughter of documentarian Robert Flaherty, who, along with her family and dozen other Inuit, was "displaced by the Canadian government and left to their own devices in the Far North" in the 1950s as part of the High Arctic relocation. It took over two years for Marquise to convince Martha to tell her story and it took more than six years of production before the film was released. The film was well received by critics and was nominated for Best Screenplay at the Gémeaux Awards. On August 18, 2010, following its release, the Canadian Minister of Indian Affairs and Northern Development, "issued an apology to Inuit relocatees, their families, and all Inuit, for relocating Inuit families to the High Arctic and for the hardship and suffering caused by the relocation."

In Martha of the North, as in many of her other films, Lepage uses conventions proper to both fiction and documentary:

"I believe a film should not suffer because parts of the story are poorly served from an iconographic point of view. The strength of fiction is that it allows us to enter in contact with the emotions more directly. Whether in fiction or documentary, it is important to feel for the real or fictitious characters. If people come out of the theatre and they haven't been touched by the film, we've missed our goal!"

In 2013, as a sequel to Martha of the North, Lepage released the documentary web series and educational website Iqqaumavara. The website presents 12 short films and some information about the High Arctic relocation. It is available in French, English and Inuktitut.

In a 1987 interview, Marquise said her work was influenced, among others, by the Quebecois films Good Riddance (Les Bons débarras), Sonatine, and It Can't Be Winter, We Haven't Had Summer Yet (Ça peut pas être l'hiver, on n'a même pas eu d'été).

== Works ==
=== Films ===
Year	Type	Title	Credit/Role	Note(s)	Ref.
1987	Fiction	Marie in the City (Marie s’en va-t-en ville)	Writer/director	Best Foreign Film at the Belfort Festival (France); Best actress at the Gijón International Film Festival (Spain); 4 nominations at the Canadian Gemini Awards	
1989	Documentary	Un soleil entre deux nuages	Writer/director	Gémeaux Award for Best Editing (Canada) Ecumenical Prize at Visions du Réel in Nyon, Switzerland Library Award at Cinéma du Réel festival (Paris).	
1993	Short film	Your Country, My Country (Dans ton pays)	Writer/Co-director	Nominated for Best Live Action Short Drama at 14th Gemini Awards.	
1994	Fiction	La fête des rois	Writer/Director		
1995	Documentary	The Lost Garden: The Life and Cinema of Alice Guy-Blaché (Le Jardin oublié)	Co-writer/Director	Gémeaux Award for Best Auteur Documentary in 1996; Bronze Apple at National Educational Media Network Competition (Oakland, California); Special Mention at Columbus International Film Festival (Ohio, US).	
2000	Documentary	Of Hopscotch and Little Girls (Des marelles et des petites filles)	Writer/Director	Bologna Film Festival, First Audience Award (2001); Gémeaux Awards: Best Documentary, Best Research, Best Editing; Golden Sheaf Award: Best Social Documentary (Canada); Grand Jury Prize, Communications and Society, Montréal (Canada); Bronze Plaque, Columbus International Film Festival (Ohio, US); Youth Award and Prix de l’État du Valais at Festival International Médias Nord-Sud (Geneva, Switzerland); Special mention at Turin Film Festival (Italy).	
2007	Documentary	Des billes, dans ballons et des garçons	Writer/Director		
2009	Documentary	Martha of the North (Martha qui vient du froid)	Co-writer/Director	Nominated at Gémeaux Awards for Best Screenplay.	
2015	Fiction	One Night Stand: A Modern Love Story (Ce qu'il ne faut pas dire)	Write/Director/Producer	Funded through crowdfunding.	
2019	Fiction	Apapacho	Writer/Director/Co-producer	Co-production between Canada and Mexico.	

=== Television ===
Year	Type	Title	Credit/Role	Note(s)	Ref.
1992	Documentary	Mon Amérique à moi	Director/writer	Co-produced by the NFB.	
1997	TV series	Les aventures de la court échelle II, 3 episodes (collective)	Director/writer	3 episodes: Les fleurs de Caroline (won Best Children Series at Gémeaux Awards), Une ville imaginaire, Toute la beauté du monde	
2001	Documentary	Canada: A People’s History	Director	2 episodes: Years of Hope and Anger, Comfort and Fear (part two). For CBC.	
2004	Documentary	Ma vie c’est le théâtre	Director/writer	1 episode. For Télé-Québec.	
2005	Documentary series	Les délateurs	Director/writer	3 episodes (45 minutes each). For TVA.	
2005	Documentary-fiction	Le rouge et le noir au service du blanc: L’esclavage en Nouvelle-France	Director/writer	1 episode. For Télé-Québec and TV5.	
2006	Documentary	Par tous les seins	Director/Writer	1 episode (45 minutes). For Canal Vie.	
2006	Documentary	Jacques Parizeau, l’homme derrière le complet	Director/writer	1 episode (120 minutes). For Radio-Canada (SRC). Nominated for Best Documentary (portrait) at Gémeaux Awards.	
2008	Documentary	Vive les fêtes!	Director	1 episode.	
2009	Documentary	Arctic Exile	Director/Writer	1episode. For CBC.	
2009-2010	Documentary	Sexe, tendresse, caresses… pour corps malade	Director/Writer/Co-producer	1 episode.	
2011-2012	Documentary	La troisième guerre mondiale	Director/writer	1 episode. For RDI/Radio-Canada.	

=== Other ===
Year	Type	Title	Credit/Role	Note(s)	Ref.
2011	Web series	Les mots et les gestes qui soignent	Director/Writer/Producer	Website created to inform cancer patients and their family.	
2012	Short video capsule	Jeanne Mance co-fondatrice de Montréal	Director/Writer	Created for the Town of Montreal.	
2012	TV series short	Les dames aux caméras	Director/Writer/Producer	Directed 1 episode. For TV5.	
2013	Documentary webseries	Iqqaumavara	Director/Writer/Producer	Multiple short documentaries/interviews.	

== Distinctions and awards ==
- 2009: Women of Distinction Award in Arts and culture, Women's Y Foundation
- 1999: Names Artiste pour la paix, Les Artistes pour la paix
- 1991: Woman of the Year in the field of Arts
- 1990: Invited to Hollywood for the event "A New Wave from Québec"
- 1988: Quebec representative at the Tokyo Film Festival

== Various contributions ==
- 2007-2009: Board Member of the Academy of Canadian Cinema & Television
- 2001-2003: Collaborator at the Institut national de l'image et du son (INIS)
- 1999-2001: Hired as director for Radio-Canada
- 1991-1994: Hired as director for the National Film Board of Canada (NFB)
- 1990-1991: President of the Association of filmmakers and directors of Quebec (ARRQ)
- 1983-1991: Associate and Board Member of les Productions du Lundi matin
- 1997: Lecturer in Cinema department at Université du Québec à Montréal (UQÀM)
- 1996: Lecturer in Cinema department at Université de Montréal (UdeM)
- Jury member for national and international festivals.
- Writer for various publications.
- Mentor to young screenwriters and male and female filmmakers.
- Volunteer for various organizations.
