= Larry Audlaluk =

Inuk activist and writer from Canada

Larry Audlaluk CC
- Born: 1950 (age 75–76); Inukjuak, Quebec
- Writing career
- Notable works: What I Remember, What I Know: The Life of a High Arctic Exile (2020)

Larry Audlaluk CC (born 1950) is an Inuk activist and writer from Canada who was among those forcibly relocated during the High Arctic relocation program. He was inducted as a Member of the Order of Canada in 2007.

His memoir, What I Remember, What I Know: The Life of a High Arctic Exile, was a shortlisted finalist for the Governor General's Award for English-language non-fiction at the 2021 Governor General's Awards.

== Early life and relocation ==
Audlaluk was born in Inukjuak, Quebec in 1950. Audlaluk's family was one of several who were forcibly relocated by the Canadian government to Grise Fiord, Nunavut in the High Arctic relocation incident of the 1950s.

His family struggled through poverty; Audlaluk sustained an eye injury in childhood and suffered pain for nearly four years before the federal government finally flew him to Montreal for medical treatment. By 2008, Audlaluk would become Grise Fiord's longest-living resident.

== Activism and career ==
Audlaluk emerged as a community leader in adulthood, and testified about his experiences to the Royal Commission on Aboriginal Peoples in 1993. Audlaluk unsuccessfully stood in the 2004 Nunavut general election in the Quttiktuq electoral district.

=== Support for Israel ===
In 1996, Audlaluk traveled to Israel and was described as "the Holy Land’s best known Inuk" due to his appearances on local television. In an article about the 2004 Nunavuk election, Nunatsiaq News stated that:

"Audlaluk is also known for his frequent visits to the Holy Land where he’s become Israel’s favourite Inuk and Nunavut’s unofficial ambassador."

== What I Remember, What I Know ==
What I Remember, What I Know was published in 2020. In addition to the Governor General's Awards, the book was also shortlisted for the 2021 J. W. Dafoe Book Prize.

== Honours ==
In 2007, he was inducted as a Member of the Order of Canada to honor his record of community service in Grise Fiord.
