= Enrico Chapela =

Mexican contemporary classical composer

- Born: January 29, 1974 (age 52); Mexico City
- Occupations: composer and guitarist
- Years active: 2000 to present
- Website: enricochapela.com

Enrico Chapela (born January 29, 1974) is a Mexican contemporary classical composer, whose works have been played by multiple major orchestras and has been commissioned to compose for institutions such as the Los Angeles Philharmonic, the National Center for the Performing Arts (Beijing) and the Festival Internacional Cervantino. His work is influenced by modern popular musical styles such as rock and electronic, as well as Mexican popular culture.

== Background ==
Chapela was born in Mexico City where he still lives. Since adolescence, he has been interested in various musical styles including classic rock, jazz, danzón and electronic along with contemporary classical.

Chapela received his bachelor's degree in composition from the Centro de Investigación y Estudios Musicales (CIEM) and studied classical guitar at the Associated Board of Royal Schools of Music in England. He later received his master's from the University of Paris Saint-Denis in 2008.

In addition to his career as a composer, Chapela has also played guitar in a heavy metal band.

== Career ==
The composer has been commissioned to create works for the Los Angeles Philharmonic (where he was an invited guest in 2008), Dresdner Sinfoniker, Carnegie Hall, Britten Sinfonia, Wigmore Hall, Berkeley Symphony, Orquesta Sinfónica Simón Bolívar, Orquestra Sinfônica de São Paulo, City of Birmingham Symphony, University of Cincinnati's CCM Symphony, Orquesta Sinfónica Carlos Chávez, Entrequatre, Cuarteto Latinoamericano, ONIX Ensemble, New Paths in Music Festival, Vail Music Festival, and the National Center for the Performing Arts (Beijing) . The Festival Internacional Cervantino commissioned Chapela t write Danza de un poeta y el viento for its 2014 edition, played by La Orquesta Mexicana, (an ensemble derived from the Pasatono Orquesta).

His first major recording was in 2005 with Antagónica, which was supported by a grand from FONCA:, CIEM and Consecuencias Discográficas.

His work has been recognized since 2002, receiving grants from the John Simon Guggenheim Memorial Foundation Fellowships, National System of Art Creators (FONCA-Mexico) and the International Rostrum of Composers (UNESCO), and individual works has won awards as well. La mengambrea received an honorable mention at the first Anacrusax Saxophone Composition Competition, and Inguesu won first place as the Alexander Zemlinsky Competition at the University of Cincinnati.

Chapela's music is exclusively published by Boosey & Hawkes, and has been performed in multiple countries in the Americas, Asias and Europe. Ensembles which has performed his pieces include the Chicago Symphony, Indianapolis Symphony, Saint Paul Chamber Orchestra, Seoul Philharmonic, Warsaw Philharmonic, Brooklyn Philharmonic, Jena Philharmonic, Philharmonic Orchestra of the Americas, Orquesta Sinfónica Nacional de México, Cabrillo Festival, Tanglewood Festival, Orquesta Sinfónica de Puerto Rico, Metropolis Ensamble, Percussion Group Cincinnati, North/South Chamber Orchestra, Nuevo Ensamble de México, Ensemble 10/10, Arditti String Quartet, Carpentier String Quartet, Cuarteto José White, Modern Sax Quartett Berlin, Haags Saxofoonkwartet, Stockholm Sax Quartet, Cosmos Sax Quartet, Case Sax Quartet, Anacrusax, Tambuco, Quinteto de Alientos de la Ciudad de México, Quinteto de Metales de la Ciudad de México, Trio de Alientos de Bellas Artes, Gonzalo Salazar, Victor Flores, Mauricio Náder, Álvaro Bitrán, Natalia Pérez Turner & Horacio Franco.

Chapela teaches composition and a concept called “matemúsica” (math-music) which uses mathematical principles to create scores. He teaches at his alma mater, CIEM, and is the director of the Núcleo Integral de Composición (NICO) in Mexico City.

In 2003, the appeared as himself in the TV documentary En el fondo somos así, and currently hosts a contemporary music radio show called Metamusica which is broadcast by OPUS 94 radio station.

== Works ==
His influences include John Cage, whose philosophy of composition he admires, along with the works of Carlos Chávez and Silvestre Revueltas.

Like other contemporary classical composers of his generation, he has integrated elements from other contemporary musical forms into his work, such as rock and electronic music. One of his early works, La condena, has strong rock influence. He is also influenced by traditional Mexican music. Having studied advanced musical electronics in Paris, he has applied the harmonic concepts of French spectralists to his works. Pieces can have much percussion and elements such as 1950s avant-garde sound effects.

Compositions can be for full orchestras, sometimes adding non-traditional instruments such as Antágonica, or for a single instrument. Melate binario is for a single guitar, based on a Mexican lottery game. It is written in two versions, eight pages each. The first vision is dodecafónica and the other diatónica. The interaction between the two produces 256 distinct compositions.

Magnetar, Chapela's concerto for the electric cello, was commissioned by the Los Angeles Philharmonic, and is described as “raunchy, orchestral heavy metal.” The cello is attached to a wah-wah pedal which gives it a unique sound unachievable for acoustic instruments.

Chapela believes that any theme can produce and interesting works, although his work is not always accepted, especially when it references Mexican popular culture. The work Ínguesu is based on the final game of the 1999 FIFA Confederations Cup, when Mexico won over Brazil at the Estadio Azteca. He has had some trouble having it played in Mexico because it is considered "naco" (low-class) especially a short series of notes near the end that reference a common insulting whistle.

The composer has also created the scores to the Mexican films, Somos lo que hay, directed by Jorge Michel Grau and Amar no es querer, directed by Guillermo Barba. Both scores have received recognition: the Mexican Film Academy 2011 nomination por best original music for the first and won “Best Original Music Score” at the “Pantalla de Cristal” film festival.

== Compositions (selection) ==
- "Magnetar" for Electric Cello and Symphonic Orchestra
- Bowsax for string quartet and saxophone quartet (2011), World Premiere 7/18/2011 -Bravo! Vail Valley Music Festival (Performers: Calder String Quartet / Mana Saxophone Quartet)
- Duelo envela for piano
- El cuarto camino for string quartet (1996)
- Lo nato es neta for rock trio and acoustic quintets (2001 2003)
- La Mengambrea for saxophone quartet (2002)
- Ínguesu – Symphonic poem for orchestra (2003)
- Melate Binario for solo acoustic guitar (2004)
- S.O.S. for flute, clarinet, piano, violin, viola and cello (2005)
- Crucigrama for string quartet with guitar quartet (2006)
- Encrypted Poetry – Concerto for percussion trio and orchestra (2007, commissioned by the Alexander Zemlinsky Composition Competition)
- Noctámbulos – Concerto for rock trio and orchestra (2008, commissioned by the Dresdner Sinfoniker)
- Li Po for chamber orchestra (2008/09, commissioned by the Los Angeles Philharmonic Association, music director Esa-Pekka Salonen, for their "Green Umbrella" new music series)
- Irrational Music for chamber orchestra (2009, commissioned by the "New Paths in Music" festival New York)
- "Rotor" for large orchestra, premiered by Orquesta Sinfonia de Mineria in 2017
