= High Arctic relocation =

1950s relocation of Inuit by Canada

Relocation from Inukjuak to Resolute (left arrow) and Grise Fiord (right arrow)

The High Arctic relocation (Note: French: délocalisation du Haut-Arctique, Inuktitut: ᖁᑦᑎᒃᑐᒥᐅᑦᑕ ᓅᑕᐅᓂᖏᑦ, romanized: Quttiktumut nuutauningit) took place during the Cold War in the 1950s, when 92 Inuit, sometimes called High Arctic exiles, were moved by the Government of Canada under Liberal Prime Minister Louis St. Laurent to the High Arctic (about 73.5 degrees North).

The forced migration is widely considered to have been implemented by the Canadian government to assert its sovereignty in the Arctic Archipelago (which had been subject to disputed territorial claims) by the use of "human flagpoles". The relocated Inuit suffered extreme privation during their first years after the move.

== History ==
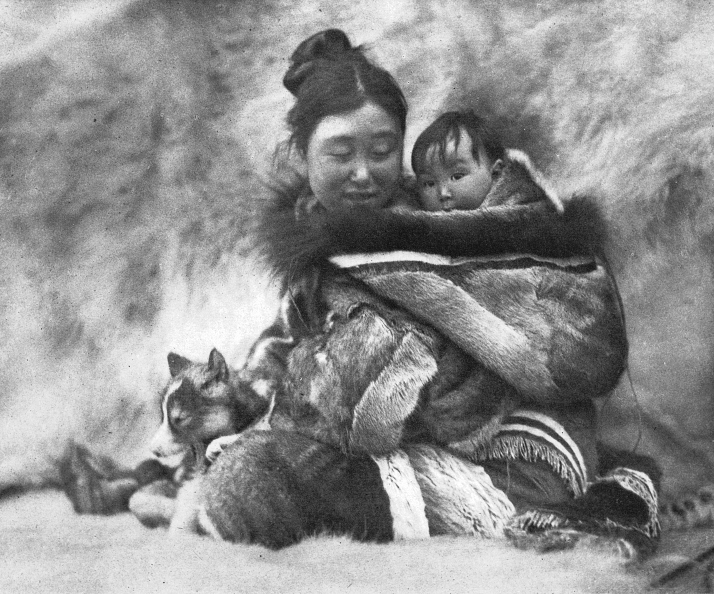
Inuit woman and child, Cape Dufferin, Quebec, c. 1920–21

In August 1953, seven or eight families from Inukjuak, Nunavik (northern Quebec) (then known as Port Harrison) were transported to Grise Fiord on the southern tip of Ellesmere Island and to Resolute on Cornwallis Island. The group included the family of writer Markoosie Patsauq. The families, who had been receiving welfare payments, were promised better living and hunting opportunities in new communities in the High Arctic. They were joined by three families recruited from the more northern community of Pond Inlet (in the then Northwest Territories, now part of Nunavut) whose purpose was to teach the Inukjuak Inuit skills for survival in the High Arctic.

The Inuit were taken on the Eastern Arctic patrol ship CGS C.D. Howe to areas on Cornwallis and Ellesmere Islands (Resolute and Grise Fiord), both large barren islands in the hostile polar north. While on the boat the families learned that they would not be living together but would be left at three separate locations.

The relocatees included Inuit who had been featured in Robert J. Flaherty's film Nanook of the North (1922), recorded prior to the relocation. It also included Josephie Flaherty, Robert's half-Inuk son, whom he never met.

=== Motivations ===
The forced relocations are widely considered to have been motivated by a desire to reinforce Canadian sovereignty in the Arctic Archipelago by creating settlements in the area. In Relocation to the High Arctic, Alan R. Marcus proposes that the relocation of the Inuit not only served as an experiment, but as an answer to "the Eskimo problem." The federal government stressed that "the Eskimo problem" was linked to the Inuit's reluctance to give up their nomadic ways in areas that were supposedly overpopulated and went so far as to provide detailed accounts of poor hunting seasons and starvation within the Inukjuak area as a direct result of over-population. However, the federal government knew the area in question was in the midst of a low trapping season due to the end of a four-year fox cycle.

The Canadian government has claimed that volunteer families had agreed to participate in a program to reduce areas of perceived overpopulation and poor hunting in northern Quebec, to reduce their dependency on welfare, and to resume a subsistence lifestyle.

=== New communities ===
The families were left without sufficient supplies of food and caribou skins and other materials for making appropriate clothing and tents, and suffered extreme privation in the first years after the relocation. Despite this, Royal Canadian Mounted Police (RCMP) reports from the time stated that the two colonies were generally successful in terms of morale, housing, and subsistence living.

As they had been moved about 2,000 km (1,200 mi) to a very different ecosystem, the displaced people were unfamiliar with the wildlife and had to adjust to months of polar night (24-hour darkness) during the winter, and the midnight sun (24-hour sunlight) during the summer, something that does not occur in northern Quebec. They were told that they would be returned home after two years if they wished, but these promises were not honoured by the government. Eventually, the Inuit learned the local beluga whale migration routes and were able to survive in the area, hunting over a range of 18,000 km^{2} (6,900 sq mi) each year.

== Re-evaluation ==
During the 1980s, the relocated Inuit and their descendants initiated a claim against the Canadian Government, arguing that

there is overwhelming evidence to suggest that the central, if not the sole, reasons, for the relocation of Inuit to the High Arctic was the desire by Canada to assert its sovereignty over the Arctic Islands and surrounding area", and in 1987 sought $10 million in compensation from the federal government.

Following public and media pressure, the federal government created a program to assist the Inuit to return to the south, and in 1989, 40 Inuit returned to their former communities, leading to a breakup of families on generational lines, as younger community members often chose to remain in the High Arctic. Those that remained are described as being fiercely committed to their home.

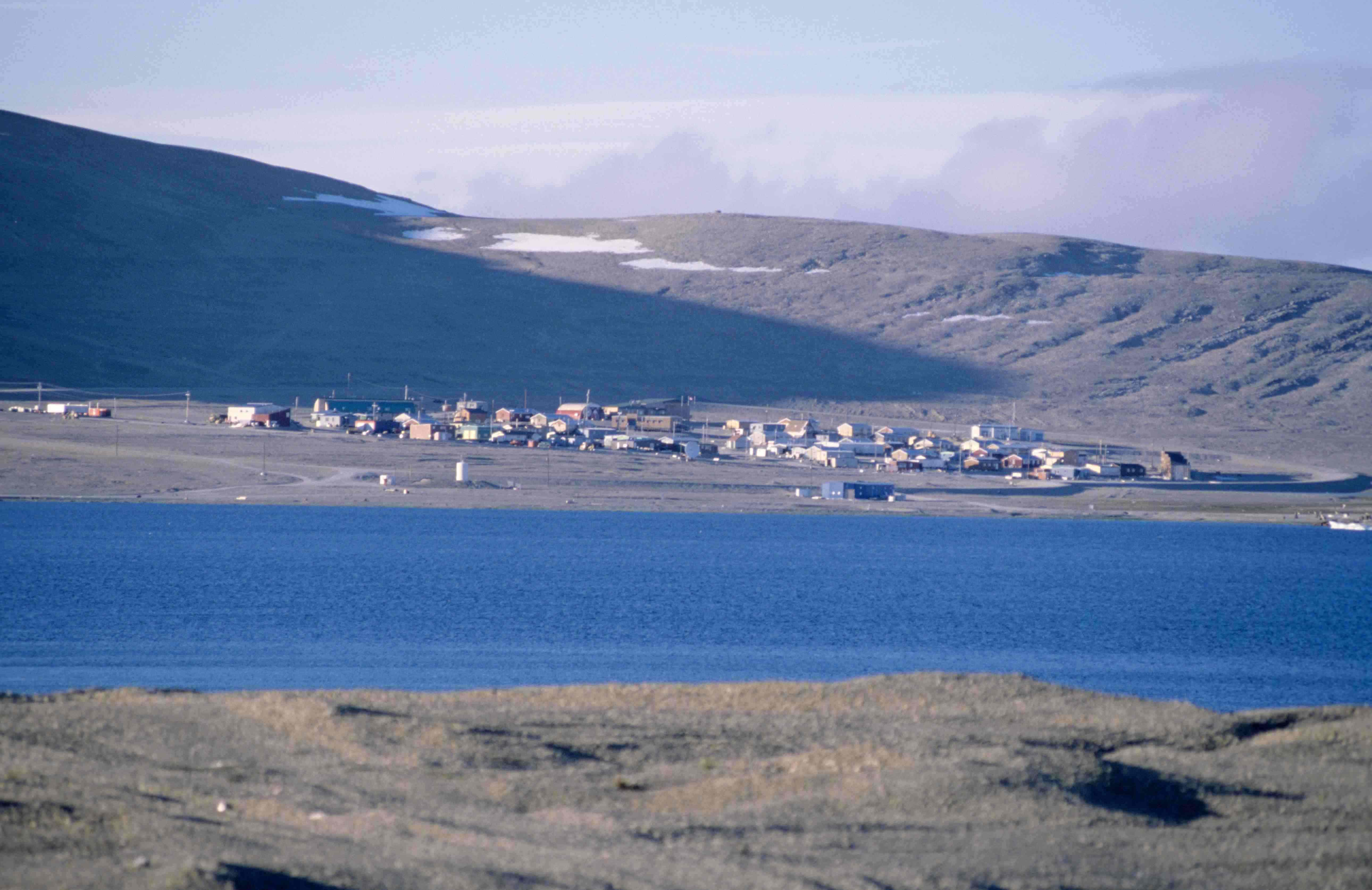
View over Resolute Bay of the modern Inuit community of Resolute (1997)

In 1990, the Canadian House of Commons Standing Committee on Aboriginal Affairs asked the government to apologize to the Inuit who had been moved to the High Arctic in 1953, to provide compensation to them, and to formally recognize the residents of Resolute and Grise Fiord for their service to Canada's sovereignty. In response, the government commissioned the "Hickling Report", which absolved them of wrongdoing, arguing that the Inuit had volunteered to be moved, and that they had been relocated due to the harsh social and economic conditions in Inukjuak. The report, written by a long-time government official, was strongly criticized by academics and the media.

In contrast, a Canadian Human Rights Commission report submitted in December 1991 argued that there was clear evidence that there were government concerns about Arctic sovereignty at the time of the relocations and an understanding that the settlements would contribute to Canadian sovereignty. The report concluded that the Government of Canada had broken its promise to return the relocatees to Inukjuak after two years if they wished. A further report, written by Trent University professor Magnus Gunther, examined the various claims of academics disputing what had occurred during the relocations. It concluded that the government had acted with humane intentions, and as a result, Tom Siddon, then Minister of Indian Affairs and Northern Development, stated that it would be "inappropriate for the government to apologize" or provide compensation.

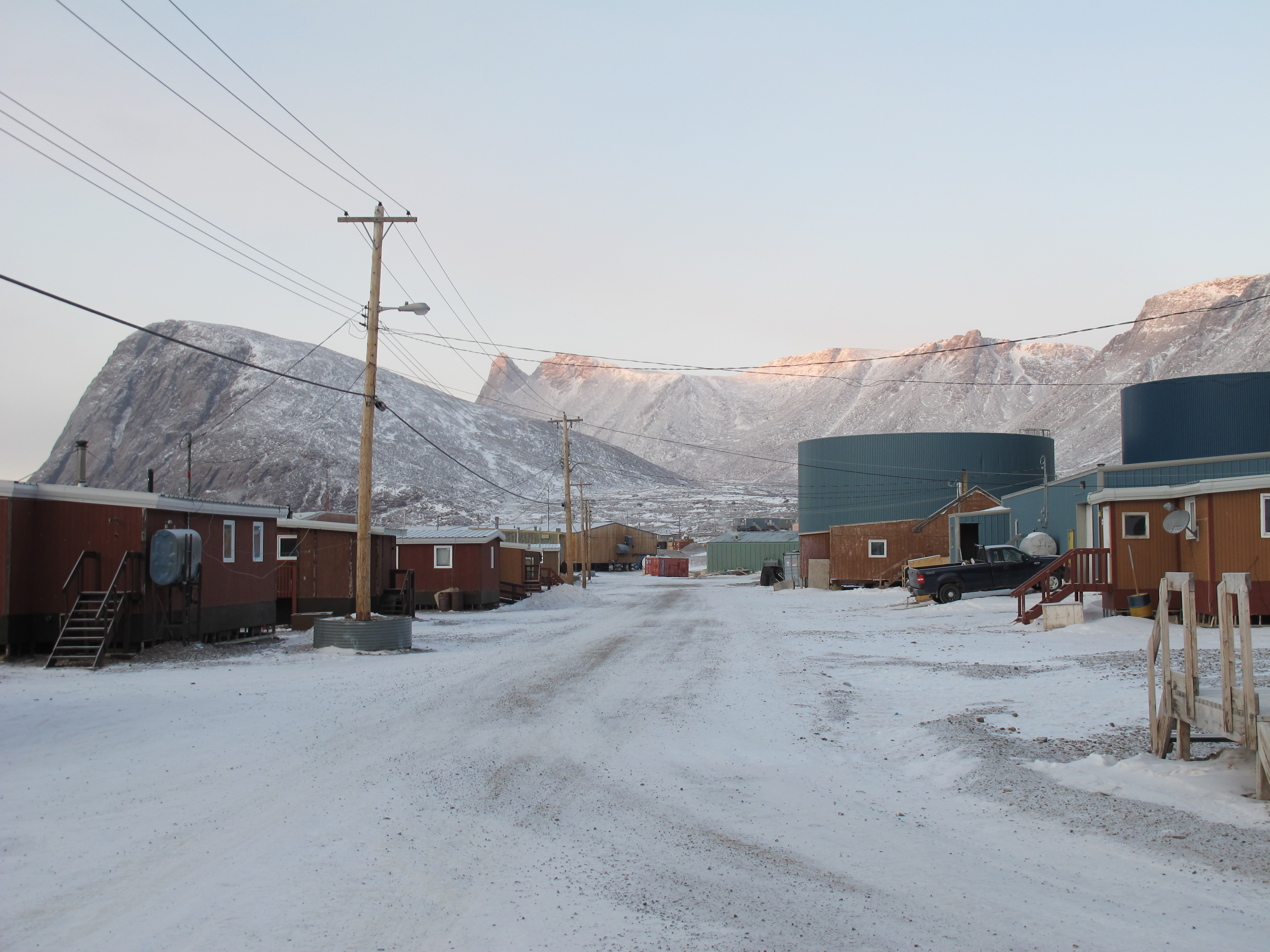
Grise Fiord community (2011)

In July 1994, the Royal Commission on Aboriginal Peoples held hearings to investigate the relocation program. The Inuit evidence overwhelmingly highlighted that they had been forcibly relocated, while government officials argued that they had moved voluntarily. The official who had been in charge of the relocation tried to suggest that witnesses had changed their stories in order to claim compensation and that the move had been a success. The Commission found that the government of Canada had determined to "rehabilitate" the Inuit of Port Harrison, weaning them from dependency and "moral decline" by moving them to better lands with abundant game for hunting, and that inadequate preparations were made for them. The commission recommended an apology and compensation for the survivors, as well as acknowledgment of the role the relocatees played in establishing a Canadian presence in the High Arctic. In their report, the commission noted that

There is therefore no doubt that the presence of Inuit settlements in the High Arctic, once established, did contribute to the maintenance of Canadian sovereignty.

— Royal Commission on Aboriginal Peoples, The High Arctic Relocation: A Report on the 1953–55 Relocation

Simultaneously, the report found that colonizing the High Arctic, before and after the relocation, was important to Canadian national sovereignty,

[...] but that, in the period when the decision was taken, sovereignty was not in the minds of decision makers.

Thus, in the eyes of the government, the maintenance of Canadian sovereignty through the High Arctic Relocation was a convenient by-product of what the report considers economic and social concerns. In the end, however, the report concluded that,

Even if sovereignty is assumed not to be a factor, this relocation was an inappropriate solution to the government's economic and social concerns. Sovereignty was, however, a material consideration, and the influence of sovereignty on the relocation serves only to reinforce the Commission's conclusions about the inappropriateness of the relocation. However, the precise extent to which sovereignty influenced the relocation is difficult to determine.

The claims of the Inuit were, therefore, at least partially supported by the report. The federal government refused to apologize, but established a "Reconciliation Agreement" in March 1996, creating a $10 million CAD trust fund for relocated individuals and their families. The government admitted that the Inuit suffered

hardship, suffering and loss in the initial years of these relocations

but required recipients to

acknowledge that they understand that in planning the relocation, the government officials of the time were acting with honourable intentions in what was perceived to be in the best interests of the Inuit at that time."

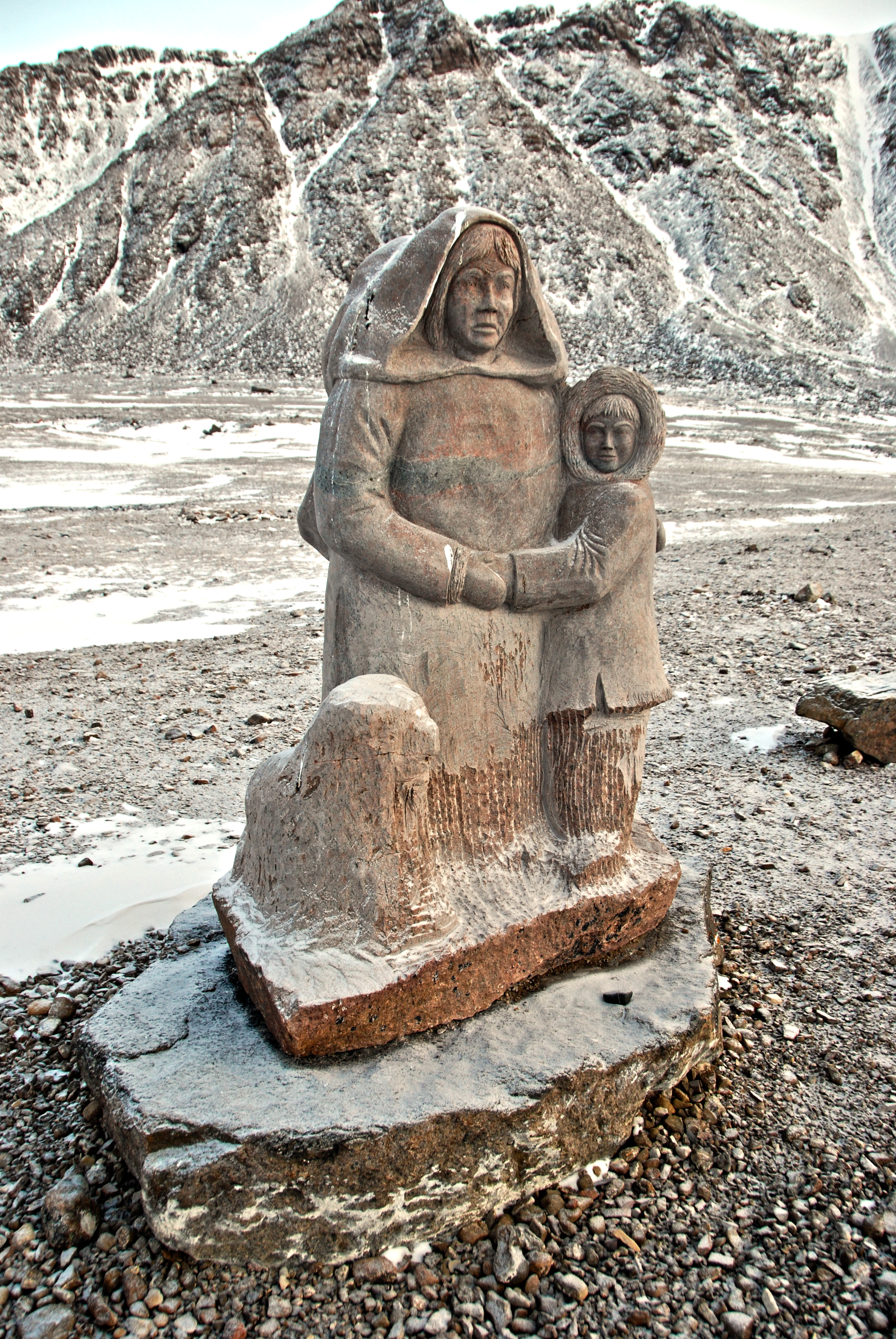
Looty Pijamini's monument of the first Inuit settlers of 1953 and 1955 in Grise Fiord

After nearly five decades, an official government apology was given on 18 August 2010 to the relocated families for the inhumane treatment and suffering caused by the relocation. John Duncan (Minister of Indian Affairs and Northern Development) stated:

The Government of Canada deeply regrets the mistakes and broken promises of this dark chapter of our history and apologizes for the High Arctic relocation having taken place. We would like to pay tribute to the relocatees for their perseverance and courage...The relocation of Inuit families to the High Arctic is a tragic chapter in Canada's history that we should not forget, but that we must acknowledge, learn from and teach our children. Acknowledging our shared history allows us to move forward in partnership and in a spirit of reconciliation.

— John Duncan

Two generations on, the term "The Relocated" remains emotive.

== In the media ==
Carvers Looty Pijamini (of Grise Fiord) and the late Simeonie Amagoalik (of Resolute) were commissioned by Nunavut Tunngavik Incorporated to build a monument to commemorate the Inuit who sacrificed so much as a result of the Government relocation of 1953 and 1955. Pijamini's monument, located in Grise Fiord, depicts a woman with a young boy and a husky, with the woman sombrely looking out towards Resolute Bay. Amagoalik's monument, located in Resolute, depicts a lone man looking towards Grise Fiord. This was meant to show separated families, and depicting them longing to see each other again. Pijamini said that he intentionally made them look melancholy because the relocation was not a happy event. The monument was unveiled in September 2010, and received praise from the Canadian Broadcasting Corporation.

The High Arctic relocation is the subject of Zacharias Kunuk's film Exile, that was produced by Isuma.

The High Arctic relocation is the subject of the film Broken Promises—The High Arctic Relocation by Patricia Tassinari (National Film Board of Canada (NFB), 1995). The relocation is also the subject of Marquise Lepage's documentary film (NFB, 2008), Martha of the North (Martha qui vient du froid). This film tells the story of Martha Flaherty, granddaughter of Robert J. Flaherty, who was relocated at 5, along with her family, from Inukjuak to Grise Fiord (Ellesmere Island). Lepage later released the 2013 web series Iqqaumavara, telling the stories of several other affected people.

Larry Audlaluk was a toddler when his family was relocated from Inukjuak on Hudson Bay to Grise Fiord in 1953; his father died 10 months later. His life story, What I Remember, What I Know: The Life of a High Arctic Exile (2020), provides a detailed personal account of the danger and death that they faced.

== See also ==
- Dislocation of Sámi people from Jukkasjärvi and Karesuando
- Environmental injustice in Europe
- Human migration
- Human rights in Canada
- Indian removal
- Indian Relocation Act of 1956
- Pituffik#Forced relocation (Thule relocation)
