= Martha Flaherty =

Inuk activist

- Born: May 29, 1950 (age 75); Inukjuak
- Relatives: Robert J. Flaherty (grandfather)

Martha Flaherty (b. May 29, 1950), is a translator and an activist on Inuit issues in Canada.

== Early life and education ==
At the age of five, Flaherty and her family were relocated to Grise Fiord as part of the Government of Canada’s second wave of the High Arctic relocation project. At 15 years old, she was forced into the residential school system, attending the Chooutla Indian Residential School in Carcross, Yukon for a brief time before transferring to Churchill Residential School, in Churchill, Manitoba, where she was enrolled from 1966-1969. She attended a nursing program at Thebacha College in Fort Smith and obtained a certificate in journalism from Carleton University.

== Activism and life work ==
Flaherty is an Inuk activist known for her contributions to issues affecting Inuit peoples. On February 25, 2021, she served as a keynote speaker at Carleton University's second annual Kinàmàgawin Symposium, which was streamed online.

Flaherty is the former president and current board member of Pauktuutit and is an Elder associated with Isaruit Inuit Arts. She has worked extensively as a translator and interpreter at provincial, territorial, and federal levels, as well as internationally. Notably, she translated the entire final report of the National Inquiry into Missing and Murdered Indigenous Women and Girls.

In the realm of media, Flaherty wrote the National Film Board of Canada documentary Martha of the North, which tells her story and highlights the challenges faced by Inuit families. Her significance has also been commemorated through the issuance of a $100 coin in 1990, where she is featured.
