= Grise Fiord (Nunavut) =

Fjord in Nunavut, Canada

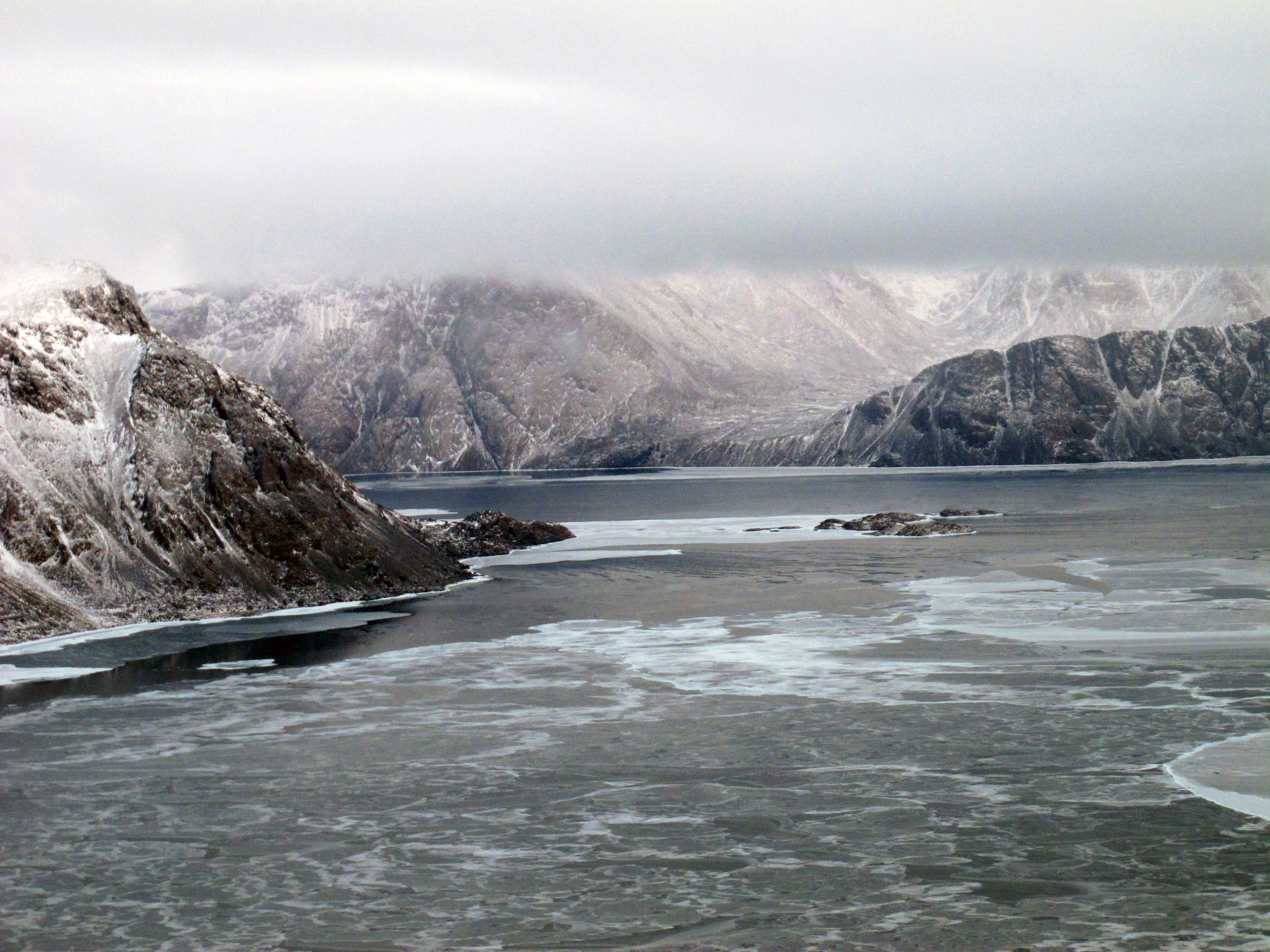

- Location in Nunavut
- Location: Ellesmere Island, Nunavut
- Coordinates: 76°35′N 83°14′W
- Ocean/sea sources: Jones Sound
- Basin countries: Canada
- Settlements: Grise Fiord

Grise Fiord is a fjord on Ellesmere Island, Qikiqtaaluk Region, Nunavut, Canada. Grise Fiord means "pig inlet" in Norwegian. Otto Sverdrup from Norway named it so during an expedition around 1900 because he thought the walrus in the area sounded like pigs. It feeds into Jones Sound and out into Baffin Bay. The Inuit community of Grise Fiord, the northernmost civilian settlement in Canada, is located at the south end of the fiord.
