= Annie Niviaxie =

Inuk artist

- Born: 1930
- Died: 1989 (aged 58–59)

Annie Niviaxie (1930–1989) was an Inuk artist known for her stone sculptures, but also worked with other materials like grass and animal skins. She initially learned her skills in sculpture from other artists in her community. Niviaxie was born in the area of Inukjuak, Quebec, and died in Kuujjuaraapik.

Her work is included in the collections of the National Gallery of Canada, the Winnipeg Art Gallery, and the National Museum of the American Indian part of the Smithsonian Institution.
