= Florin Fodor =

Romanian illegal immigrant to Canada

- Born: 1974 (age 51–52)
- Known for: Repeated illegal immigration to Arctic Canada

Florin Fodor (born 1974) is a citizen of Romania who made several efforts to illegally enter Canada. His last incursion gained notoriety as the first illegal immigrant to attempt to enter Canada through its vast and sparsely populated Arctic.

Fodor was first deported from Canada in 2000. He was deported again in 2006, when he is reported to have been returning to family in Canada. He left Sisimiut, Greenland on September 11, 2006, in a 6-metre (20 ft) fibreglass boat he purchased there, and arrived at Grise Fiord eight days later, on September 18, 2006. Upon arriving, he was almost out of food and had only five litres (1.3 US gal) of fuel left.

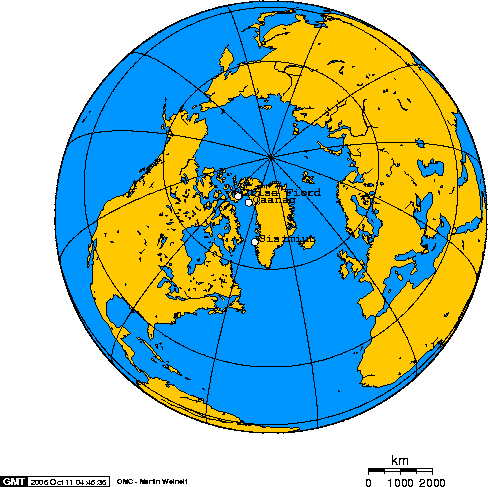
Sisimiut, Greenland and Grise Fiord, Nunavut, the endpoints of Florin Fodor's voyage.

Fodor pleaded guilty in November 2006 to two charges of violating Canada's Immigration Act. He was sentenced to seven and a half months of detention. Justice Lise Maisonneuve ruled that Fodor should be deported when his sentence was complete.

Nunavut's then premier, Eva Aariak, cited Grise Fiord's apprehension of Fodor in a speech she delivered to the Nunavut Legislature on February 19, 2009. Federal Ministers Chuck Strahl and Leona Aglukkaq were guests of the Legislature. In her speech Aariak cited Fodor's example as a demonstration of how important the people of Nunavut were to protecting Canadian sovereignty.
