= Johnny Inukpuk =

Canadian artist (1911-2007)

- ᔭᓇ ᐃᓇ
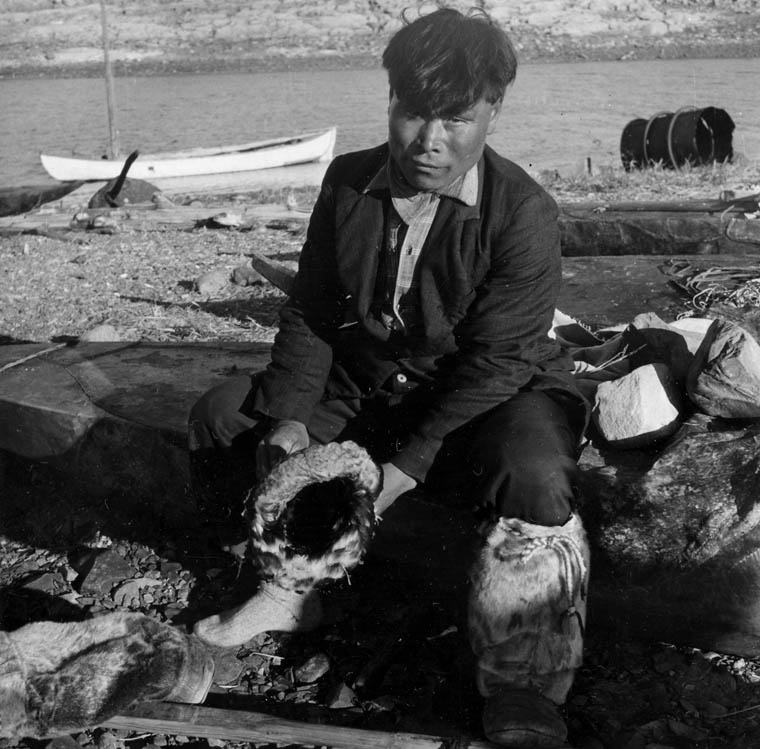
- Born: 1911; Kuujjuarapik, Quebec
- Died: 2007 (aged 95–96); Kuujjuarapik, Quebec
- Known for: Sculptor, Graphic artist

Johnny Inukpuk RCA (Inuktitut ᔭᓇ ᐃᓇ; 1911–2007) was an important Inuk artist, known as a sculptor and storyteller. His son Charlie Inukpuk is also a sculptor.

== Career ==
Johnny Inukpuk began carving in the early 1950s while living on the land. James Houston, an artist, author and filmmaker who played an important role in promoting the recognition of Inuit artists, encouraged him to continue. His themes were childrearing, domestic and hunting activities. Inukpuk’s wife, Mary, had a hare-lip, which he depicted in several of his sculptures of mother-and-child. The drilled eyes of his earlier works were eventually replaced by soapstone and ivory inlay; black eyes were made from melted vinyl records. In 1953, Inukpuk began carving green stone. His characteristically shiny, round heads began to appear in 1954.

His work titled Hunter, possibly the first large figurative piece of Inuit sculpture, was part of a collection of Inuit art that was acquired by the TD Bank Financial Group in 1951. His work received recognition as part of an exhibition of Inuit art known as The Coronation Exhibition held at Gimpel Fils in London, England in 1953. Mother with Child Playing String Games (c.1955, National Gallery of Canada) is an example of his strong approach, careful workmanship, and naturalistic detail. In 1973, Johnny Inukpuk was made a member of the Royal Canadian Academy of Arts.

Inukpuk's work is held in the permanent collections of several museums, including the Art Gallery of York University, the Musée des beaux-arts du Canada, the University of Pittsburgh Art Gallery, the Art Gallery of Ontario, and the University of Michigan Museum of Art.
