= Isa Smiler =

Inuk artist

- Born: 1921; Inukjuak, Nunavik
- Died: 1986 (aged 64–65)

Isa Smiler (born in Inukjuak, Nunavik in 1921, died at the same place in 1986) was an Inuk artist from Nunavik.

His work is included in the collections of the Musée national des beaux-arts du Québec and the Penn Museum
