= Your Country, My Country =

- French: Dans ton pays...
- Directed by: Marquise Lepage
- Written by: Marquise Lepage
- Produced by: Jacques Vallée; Monique Létourneau
- Starring: Laurent Faubert-Bouvier; Fatuma Kayembe; Louise Richer; Olivier Savoie-Mainguy
- Cinematography: Jean-Pierre Lachapelle
- Edited by: France Pilon
- Music by: Jean Derome; Robert Marcel Lepage
- Production company: National Film Board of Canada
- Release date: 1993
- Running time: 7 minutes
- Country: Canada
- Languages: French; English

Your Country, My Country (French: Dans ton pays...) is a Canadian drama short film, directed by Marquise Lepage and released in 1993. An examination of racism, the film centres on two classmates, a white Canadian boy (Laurent Faubert-Bouvier) and a Black Canadian girl (Fatuma Kayembe), who are drawn into conflict when the boy wrongly assumes that the girl's different physical appearance means she must have been born in a foreign country, but who are ultimately able to get past the initial misunderstanding and begin building a friendship when they discover that they have a lot in common.

The film was a Genie Award nominee for Best Live Action Short Drama at the 14th Genie Awards.
