= Charlie Inukpuk =

Canadian Inuk carver (born 1941)

Charlie Inukpuk is an Inuk carver from Nunavik.

== Early life and education ==
He was born in 1941, in Kotak, north of Inukjuak. His father Johnny Inukpuk was an artist; Charlie was the eldest son. He learned to carve as a teenager, from watching his father and other local artists.

== Career ==
His sculptures are often of local animals (including bears), kayaks, and mothers with children. He also carved heads for dolls that his wife, Elisapee Inukpuk, would make.

His work is held in many institutions worldwide, including the Museum of Anthropology at UBC, the University of Michigan Museum of Art, the Penn Museum, the National Gallery of Canada, the National Museum of the American Indian, the University of Saskatchewan, and the Iowa State University Museums.
