= Isa Paddy Aqiattusuk =

Inuk artist (1898–1954)

- Born: 1898; Inukjuak, Quebec
- Died: 1954 (aged 55–56); Craig Harbour, Northwest Territories

Isa Paddy Aqiattusuk (1898 – 1954) (also known as Akeeaktashuk) was an Inuk artist.

== Early life ==
He was born in the Inukjuak area of Quebec.

== Art career ==
In 1953, he was a featured artist in an exhibition at London's Gimpel Fils gallery.

His work is included in the collections of the National Gallery of Canada, the Musée national des beaux-arts du Québec and the Avataq Cultural Institute collection of Inuit art. Many of his sculptures depict hunters.

== Later life ==
Frederica Knight described him as a "friendly, outgoing man, who was fairly unsuccessful as a hunter and trapper, but whose immense talent as a stone carver was immediately recognized." The 1999 book The Canadian Encyclopedia describes him as "a jolly, robust, and outgoing man with an astonishing talent for observing and keenly portraying humans, animals, and birds in stone and ivory."

He was married and had children. He died in the Craig Harbour area of the Northwest Territories, perhaps of a hunting accident, in 1954.
