= Leah Nuvalinga Qumaluk =

- Born: April 17, 1934; Inukjuak, Canada
- Died: 2010 (aged 75–76)

Leah Nuvalinga (Sala) Qumaluk (April 17, 1934 – 2010) was a Canadian Inuk artist.

Born in Inukjuak, Quebec, Qumaluk and her husband, Josie Qumaluk, moved to Puvirnituq in 1954. She began her career as a carver before experimenting with stoneblock printing in 1960. She would go on to author at least ninety-five prints during her career, printing most of them herself as well; most of these were stonecuts. She also printed hundreds of editions for other artists, holding a regular job in a print shop to make the output possible. Early prints were dominated by mythological themes or demons conjured up by her own imagination; these were later replaced with quieter subjects such as animals or depictions of traditional life. By the late 1970s, her output had diminished, and in 1985 she retired. Her style is different from that of other Puvirnituq artists in that she did not use the border of the uncut block to frame her images.

Qumaluk's work may be found in the collections of the National Gallery of Canada, the Canadian Museum of Civilization, the Winnipeg Art Gallery, and the Metropolitan Museum of Art.
