= Looty Pijamini =

Canadian artist

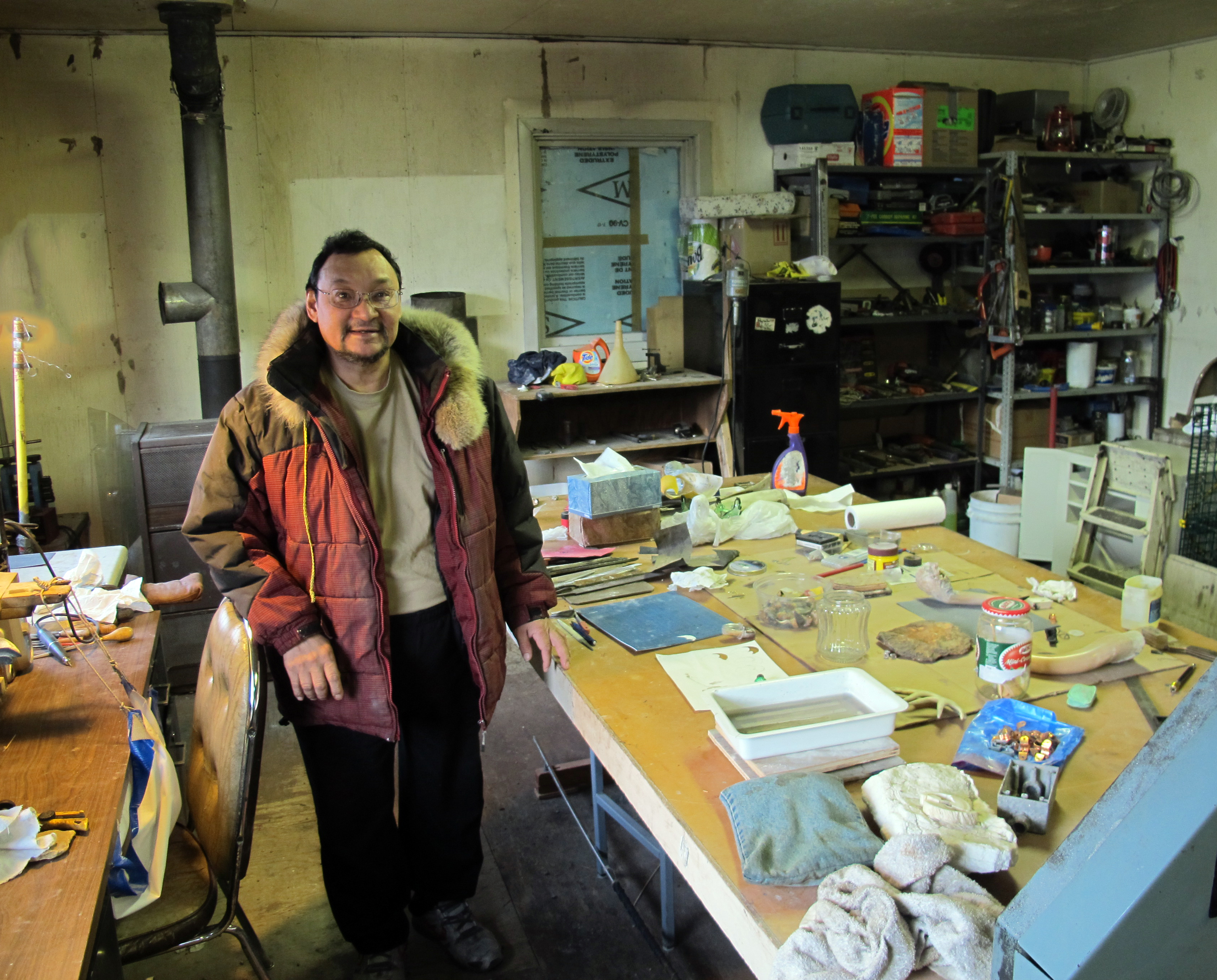
- Looty Pijamini in his shop
- Born: 1953 (age 72–73); Clyde River, Nunavut

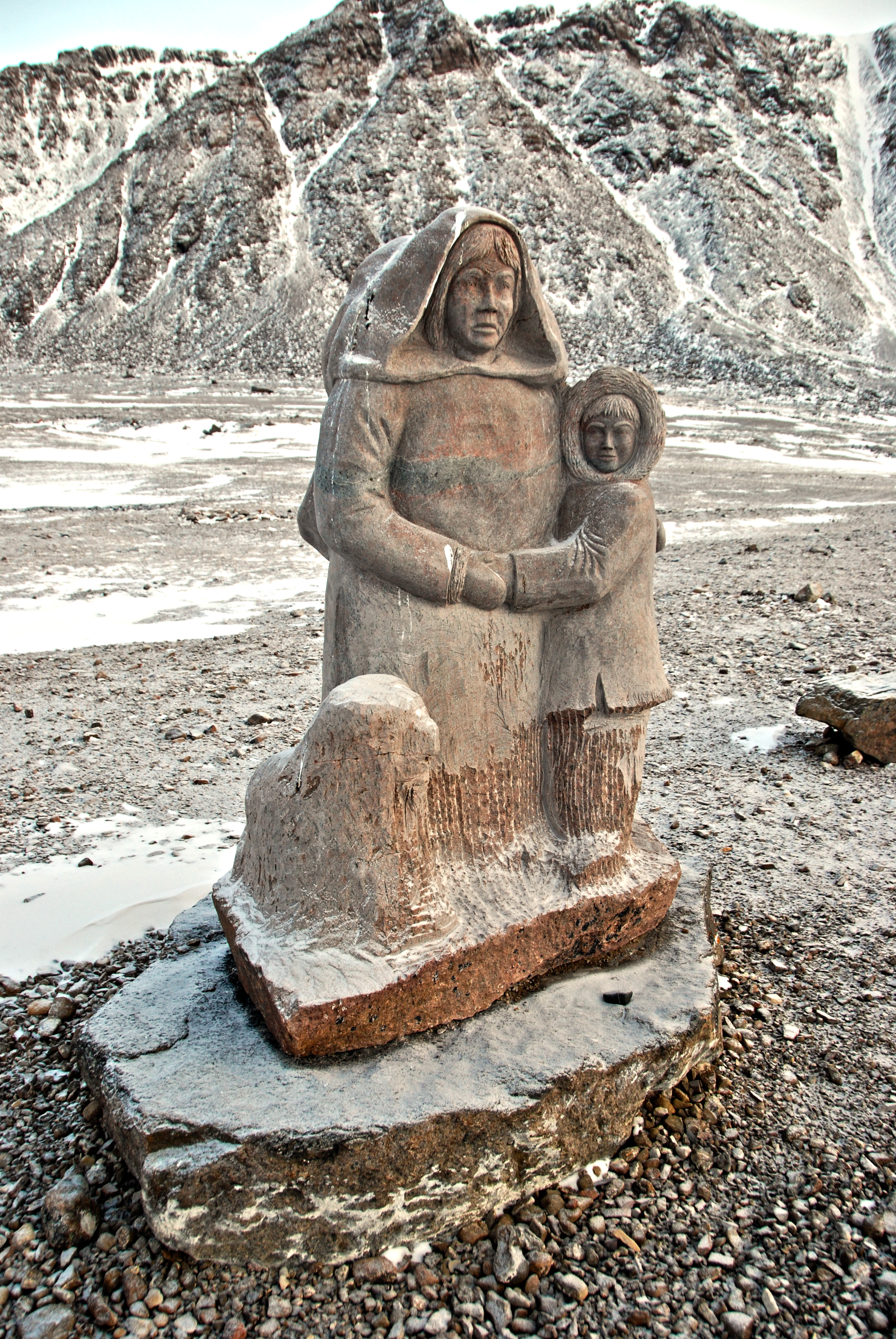
Monument of the first Inuit settlers of 1952 and 1955

Looty Pijamini (Inuktitut syllabics: ᓘᑎ ᐱᔭᒥᓂ; born 1953) is a Canadian Inuk artist. He lives and works in Grise Fiord, Nunavut.

Pijamini was born November 14, 1953, in Clyde River, Nunavut, and moved to Grise Fiord in 1961, when his father, who was a special constable in the Royal Canadian Mounted Police, was posted there.

Along with Simeonie Amagoalik in Resolute, Pijamini was commissioned by the Canadian government to build a monument to the High Arctic relocation which took place in 1955. Pijamini's monument, located in Grise Fiord, depicts a woman with a young boy and a husky, with the woman somberly looking out towards the ocean. Pijamini said that he intentionally made them look melancholy because the relocation was not a happy event. The monument was unveiled in September 2010.
