= Taamusi =

Male given name

Taamusi ᑖᒧᓯ Tuumasi ᑑᒪᓯ Tomassie Thomassie
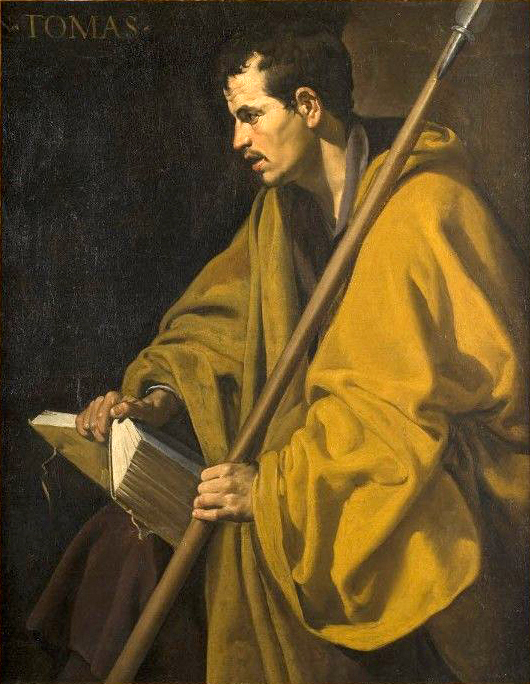
- Saint Thomas the Apostle
- Pronunciation: [ta:.mu.si] [tu:.ma.si]
- Gender: Male
- Language: Inuktitut

Origin
- Word/name: Aramaic

Taamusi (ᑖᒧᓯ), Tuumasi (ᑑᒪᓯ), Tomassie and Thomassie are Inuit Christian names originally given to Inuit baptised by missionaries in Kuujjuarapik. These names are used both as first names and surnames. It is derived from English, Thomas.

== Examples ==
- Taamusi Qumaq (1914-1993), politician and writer
- Tumasi Quissa (1948-), singer and song-writer
- Thomassie Mangiok (1983-), graphic designer
