= Taamusi Qumaq =

Inuk chief and cultural preservationist

- ᑖᒧᓯ ᖁᒪᖅ
- Pronunciation: [taː.mu.si qu.maq]
- Born: Qumaq; January 1, 1914; Niqsiturlik Island, near Port Harrison, Nunavik, Quebec, Canada
- Died: July 13, 1993 (aged 79); Povungnituk, Nunavik, Quebec, Canada
- Education: None
- Occupations: Writer, Politician
- Movement: Inuuqatigiit Tunngavingat Nunaminni
- Spouse: Maina Milurtuq
- Parents: Juusua Nuvalinngaq (father); Aalasi Qingalik (mother)

Taamusi Qumaq, CM CQ (January 1, 1914 – July 13, 1993) was an Inuk historian, linguist, writer, politician and elder from Nunavik, Quebec, Canada, who contributed to the preservation of the Inuit language and traditional culture. Despite lacking any formal schooling, Qumaq published two seminal works on the Inuit culture: a 30,000-word comprehensive Inuktitut dictionary and an encyclopedia on Inuit traditional customs and knowledge. He was fluent in Inuktitut only.

He understood Canadian and Quebec institutions and worked for their integration into Inuit lifestyle for the betterment of his community. He was a founding member of the first non-governmental co-op in the Canadian Arctic, in 1956 in Povungnituk. After contributing to the establishment of Rankin Inlet in the Northwest Territories, he returned to Povungnituk in 1960 and founded its first village council and acted as its chair from 1962 to 1968.

From 1972 to 1977, he was a vocal opponent of the James Bay and Northern Quebec Agreement and the leader of Inuit Tungavingat Nunamini, a movement opposing the signature of the land claims settlement by the Northern Quebec Inuit Association. In 1983 he took part to the Quebec commissions on Aboriginal rights and on Nouveau-Québec’s self-government.

In 2010, Presses de l'Université du Québec published his autobiography translated in French, Je veux que les Inuit soient libres de nouveau (I want Inuit to be free again). The autobiography was later re-released as a bilingual version in French and Inuktitut in 2020.

== Name ==
The name Qumaq was originally an Inuit mononym. In 1917, he was baptized and given the Christian name Taamusi (Thomas). Qumaq eventually became registered as his family name.

== Early life ==
Qumaq was born on Niqsiturlik island near Port Harrison sometime in January 1914 to his nomadic parents. The family travelled by dog sled between Great Whale River and Povungnituk and hunted game such as walrus, seal, and fish. Qumaq's family also collected fox pelts to trade for European supplies at trading posts near Port-Harrison and Povungnituk. In 1920, his mother participated in the filming of Nanook of the North.

His father died in a boating accident when Qumaq was 13 years old. Without this teaching figure, Qumaq had to rely on other Inuit families to learn how to hunt and construct an igloo. He settled in 1931 in Povungnituk with his siblings and mother.

== Adult life ==
In 1937, he married Maina Milurtuq. Over the next few years, there were few animals and starvation abounded in his community, which was exacerbated by the concomitant closing of trading posts, the drop in value of fox pelts and the decrease in availability of commodities due to World War II. However, Qumaq was able to sustain his family and elders with the help of other hunters. Mail was flown in from Moose Factory to Port-Harrison, and Qumaq was responsible from ferrying all the mail to Povungnituk, Akulivik, Ivujivik, and Saglouc on a single dog sled. He would bring the mail to Povungnituk, after which it was picked up by another courier to be transported farther north.

Following the relocation of Inuit near Akulivik and Povungnituk to Povungnituk proper in 1952, and the establishment of social welfare, Qumaq began to work at the new Hudson's Bay Company store for $150 per month. He travelled with members of the Hudson's Bay Company in 1958 to establish a general goods store to the north of Churchill, Manitoba, but instead landed in Rankin Inlet due to bad weather, where he lived for two years.

1958 was also the beginning of prefab wooden houses in Povungnituk. Previously, Inuit lived in igloos during the winter and tents during the summer. Upon his return to Povungnituk, Qumaq constructed his house in 1960 and never built another igloo.

== Political life ==
In 1961, an administrator of the department of Indian Affairs and Northern Development Canada mandated that a village council be elected. Nobody campaigned for the position and no names were pre-written on the ballot. To his own surprise, Qumaq was elected as head of the village council.

He lobbied against the federal residential school that was established in 1958, eventually replacing it in 1969 by public vote 89 to 9 with a school run by the Quebec government where Inuktitut and Inuit culture would be taught, in addition to the primary topics in English or French.

He also supported the new Inuit co-operative general store founded in 1963, which would eventually become a federation of co-operatives across Nunavik in 1966. The co-operatives made money by selling soapstone carvings in the south and by selling commodities to the local Inuit.

Qumaq and representatives from all the other villages in Nunavik met with René Lévesque in Fort Chimo in 1964, where they discussed Inuit autonomy and place in Quebec society.

He oversaw the construction of houses to ensure everyone had a permanent residence to stay. In his life he witnessed the gradual appearance of motor boats, skidoos, and alcohol in the community.
