= Adamie Niviaxie =

Inuk sculptor (born 1925)

Adamie Niviaxie (1925–?) was an Inuk sculptor.

== Early life and education ==
He was born in 1925. He lived in Inukjuak, Nunavik, Quebec, Canada. His father was a wood worker who built boats in Kuujjuarapik.

== Career ==
His sculptures are primarily animals carved in stone.

His work is held in a variety of museums, including the British Museum, the University of Michigan Museum of Art, and the Museum of Anthropology at UBC.
