= Grise Fiord =

Grise Fiord ᐊᐅᔪᐃᑦᑐᖅ Aujuittuq
- Hamlet
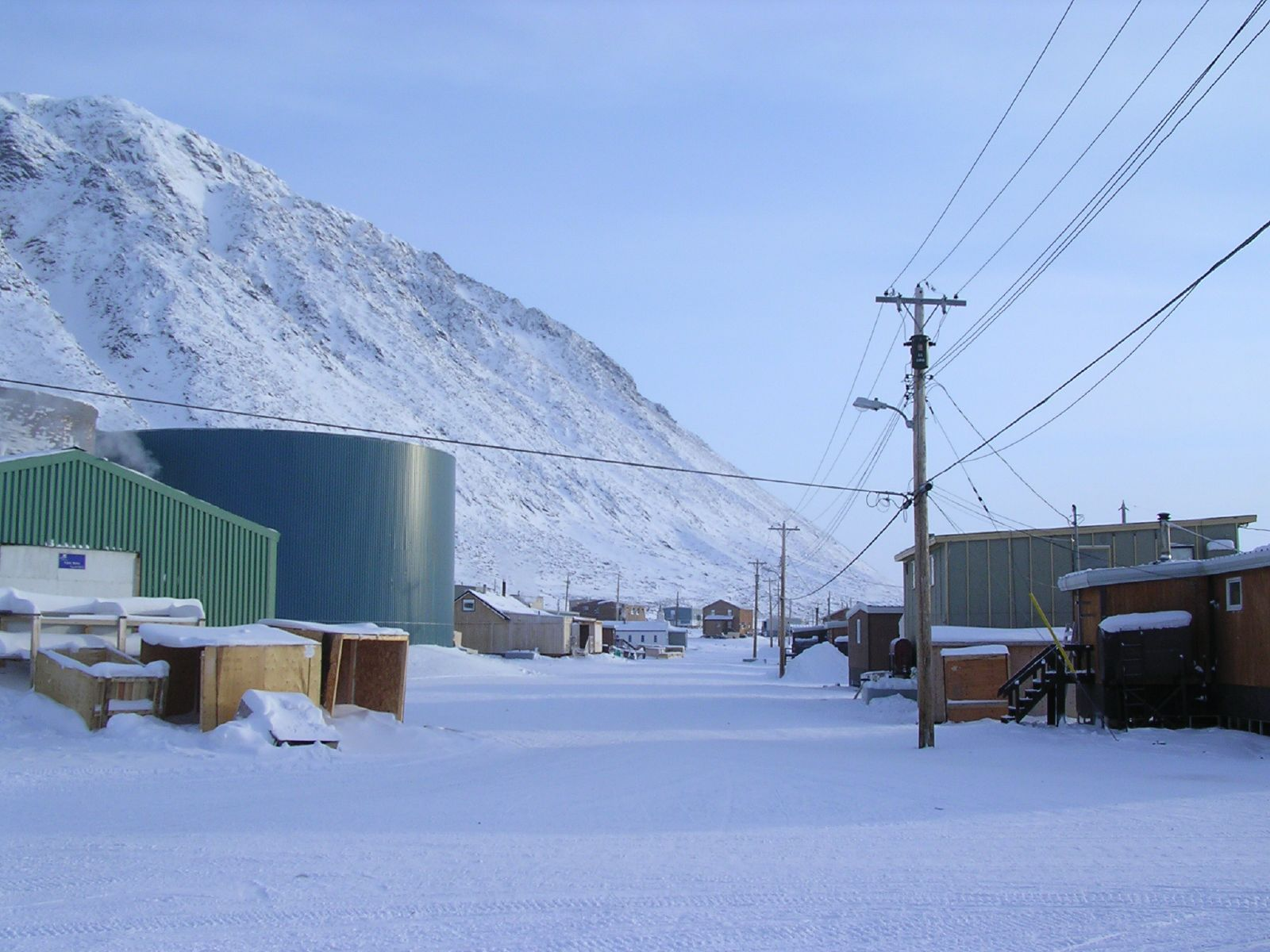
- Downtown Grise Fiord, March 2004
- Interactive map of Grise Fiord
- Location within Nunavut Location within Canada
- Coordinates: 76°25′00″N 082°53′45″W
- Country: Canada
- Territory: Nunavut
- Region: Qikiqtaaluk
- Electoral district: Quttiktuq
- High Arctic relocation: 1953

Government
  - Mayor: Meeka Kiguktak
  - MLA: Steven Taqtu

Area
  - Total: 332.90 km^{2} (128.53 sq mi)
- Elevation (at airport): 41 m (135 ft)

Population (2021)
  - Total: 144
  - Density: 0.4/km^{2} (1.0/sq mi)
- Time zone: UTC−05:00 (EST)
  - Summer (DST): UTC−04:00 (EDT)
- Canadian Postal code: X0A 0J0
- Area code: 867, Exchange: 980

Grise Fiord (/ɡriːz fiˈɔːrd/; Inuktitut: ᐊᐅᔪᐃᑦᑐᖅ, romanized: Aujuittuq, lit. 'place that never thaws') is an Inuit hamlet on the southern tip of Ellesmere Island, in the Qikiqtaaluk Region, Nunavut, Canada. It is one of three populated places on the island; despite its low population (144 residents at the 2021 Canadian census), it is the largest community (and only public community) on Ellesmere Island. Created by the Canadian Government in 1953 through a forced relocation of Inuit families from Inukjuak, Quebec, it is Canada's northernmost public community. It is also one of the coldest inhabited places in the world, with an average yearly temperature of −16.5 °C (2.3 °F).

== History ==
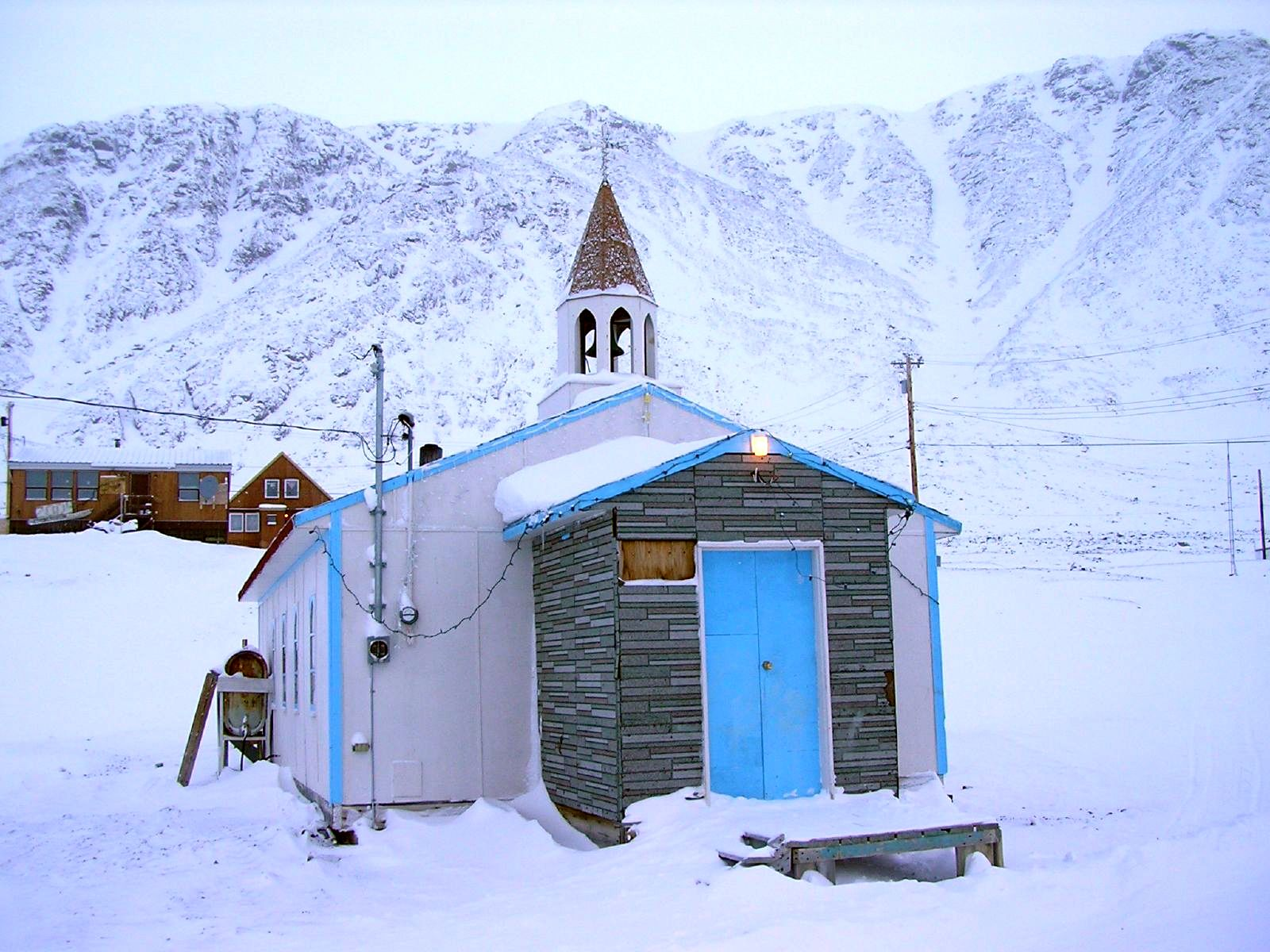
Grise Fiord Church, which was destroyed by fire on February 27, 2018

=== Creation ===
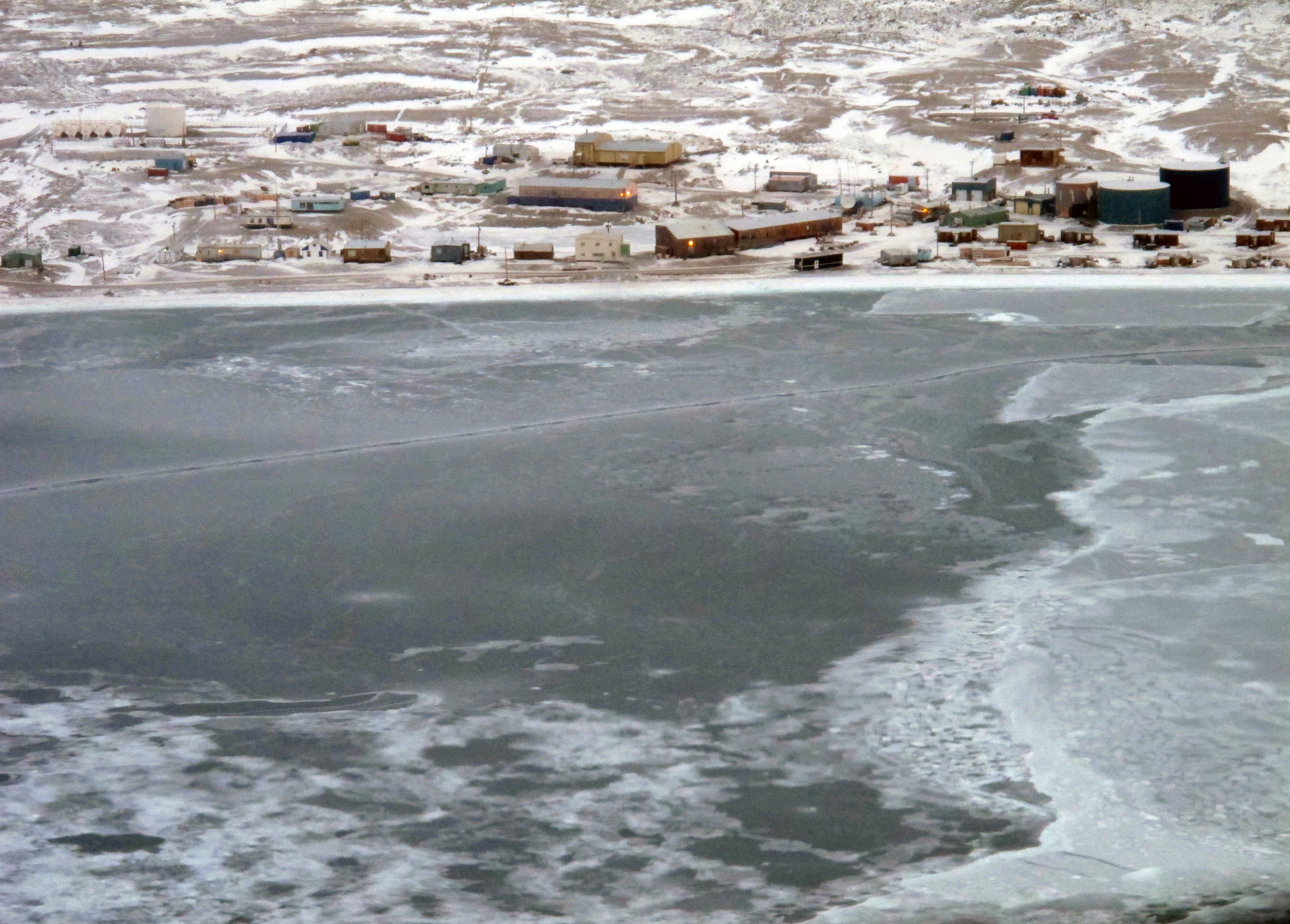
Grise Fiord

This community (and that of Resolute) was created by the Canadian government in 1953, partly to assert sovereignty in the High Arctic during the Cold War. Eight Inuit families from Inukjuak, Quebec (on the Ungava Peninsula), were relocated after being promised homes and game to hunt, but the relocated people discovered no buildings and very little familiar wildlife. They were told that they would be returned home after "two or three years" if they wished. This offer was later withdrawn however, for it would have damaged Canada's claims to sovereignty in the area; the Inuit were forced to stay. Eventually, the Inuit learned the local beluga whale migration routes and were able to survive in the area, hunting over a range of 18,000 km^{2} (6,900 sq mi) each year.

In 1993, the Canadian government held hearings to investigate the relocation program. The Royal Commission on Aboriginal Peoples issued a report entitled The High Arctic Relocation: A Report on the 1953–55 Relocation, recommending a settlement. The government paid CAD10 million to the survivors and their families, and gave a formal apology in 2010.

In 2009, artist and Grise Fiord resident, Looty Pijamini, was commissioned by Nunavut Tunngavik Incorporated to build a monument to commemorate the Inuit who sacrificed so much as a result of the Government's forced relocation programme of 1953 and 1955. Pijamini's monument, located in Grise Fiord, depicts a woman with a young boy and a husky, with the woman sombrely looking out towards Resolute Bay towards the companion monument carved by Simeonie Amagoalik. The Resolute monument depicts a lone man looking towards Grise Fiord. This was meant to show separated families, and depict them longing to see each other again. The Grise Fiord monument was unveiled by John Duncan, at the time, Minister of Aboriginal Affairs and Northern Development and Federal Interlocutor for Métis and Non-Status Indians, on September 10, 2010.

Grise Fiord was the location for a 1995 BBC television documentary entitled Billy Connolly: A Scot in the Arctic, in which the comedian Billy Connolly camped alone for a week on the pack ice near to the community, armed with a rifle to protect him from polar bears.

== Geography ==
Located at the southern tip of Ellesmere Island, Grise Fiord is one of three permanently inhabited places on the island. Farther north on the island, Environment Canada has a permanent weather station at Eureka, and at Alert there is a permanent Canadian Forces Base (CFS Alert) and weather station. Grise Fiord lies 1,160 km (720 mi) north of the Arctic Circle, and is the northernmost civilian community in Canada.

Grise Fiord is cradled by the Arctic Cordillera mountain range.

=== Climate ===
Grise Fiord has a tundra climate (Köppen: ETf; Trewartha: Ftkd) with very short, cool summers and long, cold winters lasting almost the entire year.

Climate data for Grise Fiord (Grise Fiord Airport) WMO ID: 71971; coordinates 76°25′22″N 82°54′08″W; elevation: 44.5 m (146 ft); 1991–2020 normals, extremes 1984–present
Month	Jan	Feb	Mar	Apr	May	Jun	Jul	Aug	Sep	Oct	Nov	Dec	Year
Record high humidex	−1.3	−5.0	2.3	−2.4	8.4	14.2	15.0	14.4	6.9	5.9	2.4	−1.8	15.0
Record high °C (°F)	4.4 (39.9)	−0.5 (31.1)	2.7 (36.9)	3.0 (37.4)	12.5 (54.5)	14.4 (57.9)	15.6 (60.1)	14.8 (58.6)	8.5 (47.3)	7.5 (45.5)	3.0 (37.4)	0.5 (32.9)	15.6 (60.1)
Mean daily maximum °C (°F)	−27.1 (−16.8)	−27.7 (−17.9)	−25.0 (−13.0)	−15.8 (3.6)	−4.0 (24.8)	4.0 (39.2)	6.8 (44.2)	5.6 (42.1)	0.1 (32.2)	−7.5 (18.5)	−15.9 (3.4)	−21.4 (−6.5)	−10.7 (12.7)
Daily mean °C (°F)	−30.6 (−23.1)	−31.8 (−25.2)	−29.3 (−20.7)	−21.0 (−5.8)	−8.4 (16.9)	1.1 (34.0)	—	—	−1.9 (28.6)	−10.0 (14.0)	−19.3 (−2.7)	−25.0 (−13.0)	—
Mean daily minimum °C (°F)	−31.7 (−25.1)	−33.7 (−28.7)	−32.1 (−25.8)	−24.3 (−11.7)	−11.1 (12.0)	−1.5 (29.3)	1.1 (34.0)	0.7 (33.3)	−3.6 (25.5)	−11.4 (11.5)	−20.2 (−4.4)	−27.0 (−16.6)	−16.3 (2.7)
Record low °C (°F)	−45.0 (−49.0)	−47.0 (−52.6)	−46.0 (−50.8)	−40.5 (−40.9)	−30.5 (−22.9)	−13.0 (8.6)	−3.5 (25.7)	−7.4 (18.7)	−16.0 (3.2)	−29.0 (−20.2)	−41.1 (−42.0)	−42.0 (−43.6)	−47.0 (−52.6)
Record low wind chill	−53.3	−51.8	−54.5	−44.9	−31.3	−12.3	−4.9	−12.6	−20.0	−33.2	−48.0	−45.6	−54.5
Average precipitation mm (inches)	7.9 (0.31)	6.0 (0.24)	13.5 (0.53)	12.1 (0.48)	9.4 (0.37)	13.8 (0.54)	35.0 (1.38)	28.0 (1.10)	15.4 (0.61)	18.6 (0.73)	14.8 (0.58)	8.8 (0.35)	183.2 (7.21)
Average rainfall mm (inches)	0.0 (0.0)	0.0 (0.0)	0.0 (0.0)	0.0 (0.0)	0.2 (0.01)	10.2 (0.40)	31.8 (1.25)	21.3 (0.84)	5.1 (0.20)	0.1 (0.00)	0.0 (0.0)	0.0 (0.0)	68.7 (2.70)
Average snowfall cm (inches)	6.8 (2.7)	5.7 (2.2)	11.1 (4.4)	10.4 (4.1)	9.6 (3.8)	4.7 (1.9)	1.6 (0.6)	11.2 (4.4)	14.3 (5.6)	—	14.8 (5.8)	—	—
Average precipitation days (≥ 0.2 mm)	7.2	6.6	9.3	9.0	7.6	6.0	8.9	8.6	7.4	9.6	8.00	8.0	96.0
Average rainy days (≥ 0.2 mm)	0.0	0.0	0.0	0.0	0.12	3.7	7.2	7.2	1.4	0.13	0.0	0.0	19.8
Average snowy days (≥ 0.2 cm)	5.5	4.7	6.1	5.2	5.6	1.6	0.47	2.2	5.1	—	6.6	—	—
Source: Environment and Climate Change Canada

== Demographics ==
Federal census population history of Grise Fiord
Year	Pop.	±%
1976	121	—
1981	106	−12.4%
1986	114	+7.5%
1991	130	+14.0%
1996	148	+13.8%
2001	163	+10.1%
2006	141	−13.5%
2011	130	−7.8%
2016	129	−0.8%
2021	144	+11.6%
Source: Statistics Canada

In the 2021 Canadian census conducted by Statistics Canada, Grise Fiord had a population of 144 living in 58 of its 64 total private dwellings, an increase of 11.6% from its 2016 population of 129. With a land area of 332.9 km^{2} (128.5 sq mi), it had a population density of 0.4/km^{2} (1.1/sq mi) in 2021.

== Community and fiord names ==
Just to the north of the community is the actual fiord, Grise Fiord, which means "pig inlet" in Norwegian. Otto Sverdrup from Norway so named it during an expedition around 1900 because he thought walruses in the area sounded like pigs.

The Inuktitut name is ᐊᐅᔪᐃᑦᑐᖅ (Aujuittuq), which means "place that never thaws".

== Living conditions ==
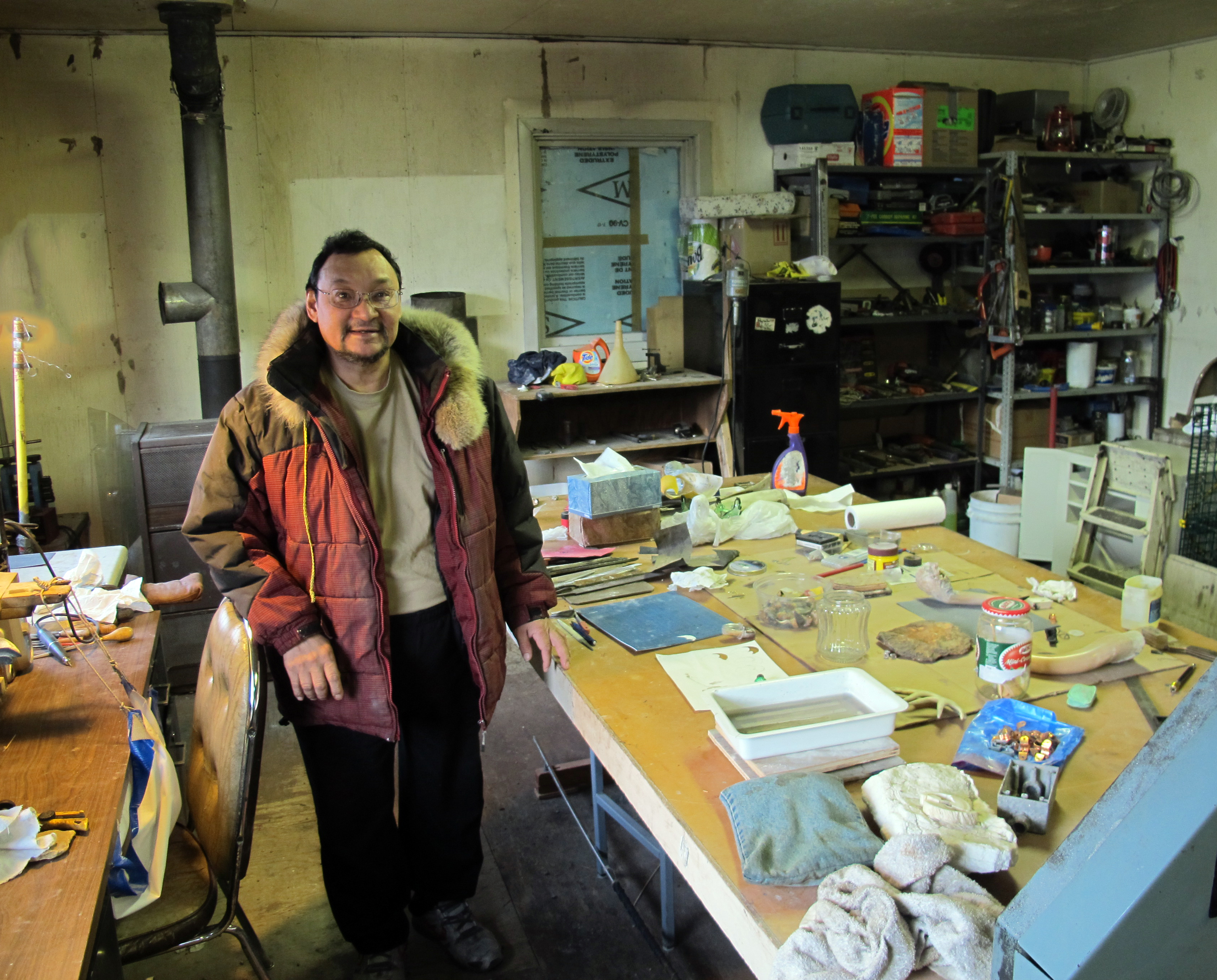
Artist Looty Pijamini in his studio

The houses are wooden and built on platforms to cope with the freezing and thawing of the permafrost. Hunting is still an important part of the lifestyle of the mostly Inuit population. Quota systems allow the villagers to supply many of their needs from populations of seals, walruses, narwhal and beluga whales, polar bears and muskox. Ecotourism is developing as people come to see the northern wildlife found on Ellesmere and the surrounding islands.

=== Transportation ===
There are no connecting roads on Ellesmere Island, so Grise Fiord is connected to the rest of the world by a small airstrip (Grise Fiord Airport), 1,675 ft (511 m) in length. Surrounded by mountains, it has one of the most difficult approaches for aircraft; it is cautioned that only very experienced pilots of Pilatus PC-12, DHC-6 Twin Otter and DHC-7 aircraft attempt the approach.

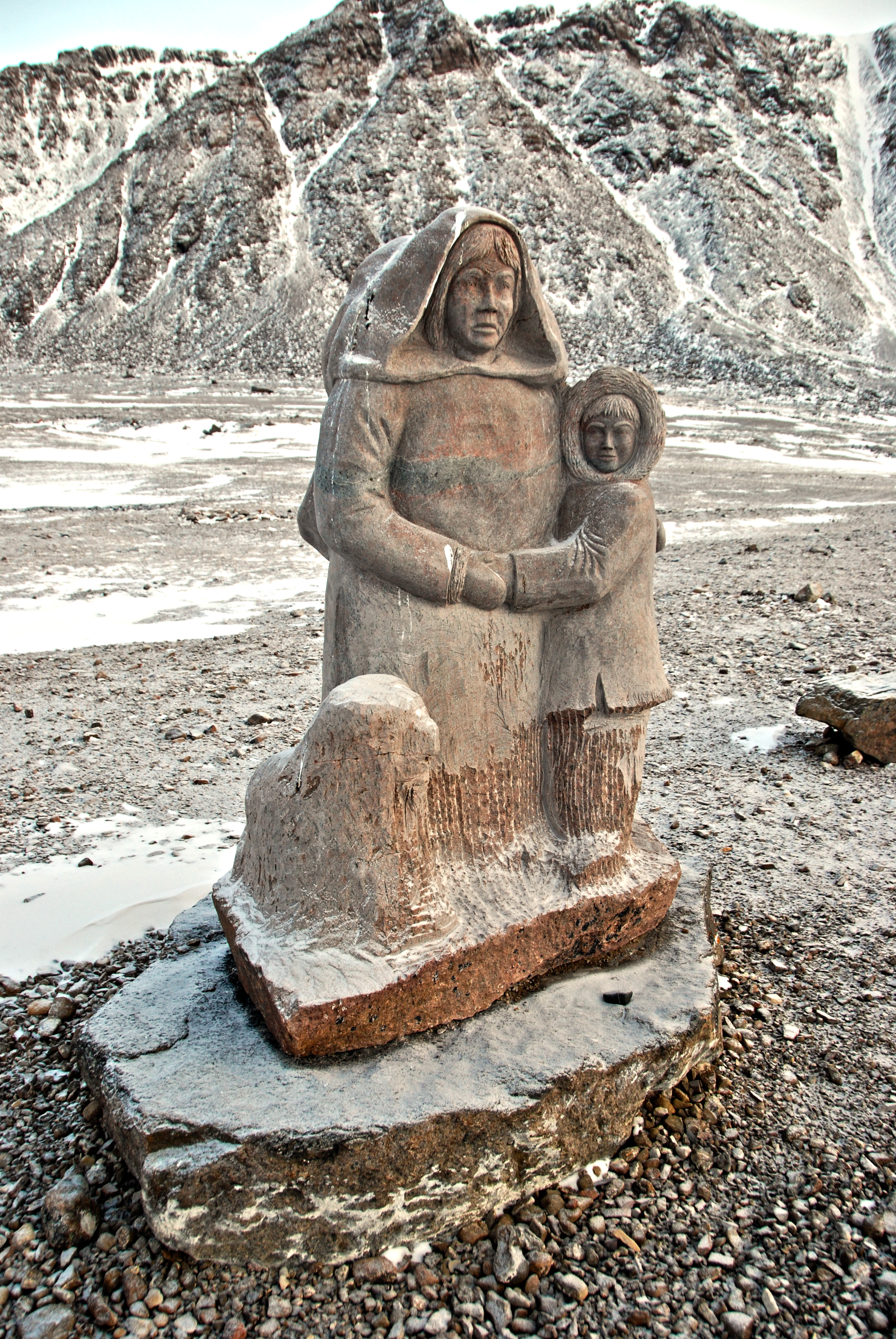
Monument to the first Inuit exiles of 1952 and 1955

For local travel needs, the villagers use all-terrain vehicles in the summer and snowmobiles in the winter. During the winter months, travel is limited to the town site and a small patch of land to the east, called Nuvuk, due to mountains and ice fields that cut off the town from the rest of the island. Small boats are used in summer to reach hunting grounds, and to hunt sea mammals on the ocean. Once a year, large ships (sealift) arrive with supplies and fuel.

=== Economy, development, and sustainability ===
The local cooperative is the main place to purchase supplies. There are local guide and outfitting operations, which are an important source of income for many families, as are carving, traditional clothing and other Inuit crafts. Due to the extreme location, the economy is subsistence-based. Because of the potential for avalanches and falling rocks from mountains, there is no room for expansion.

=== Communications ===
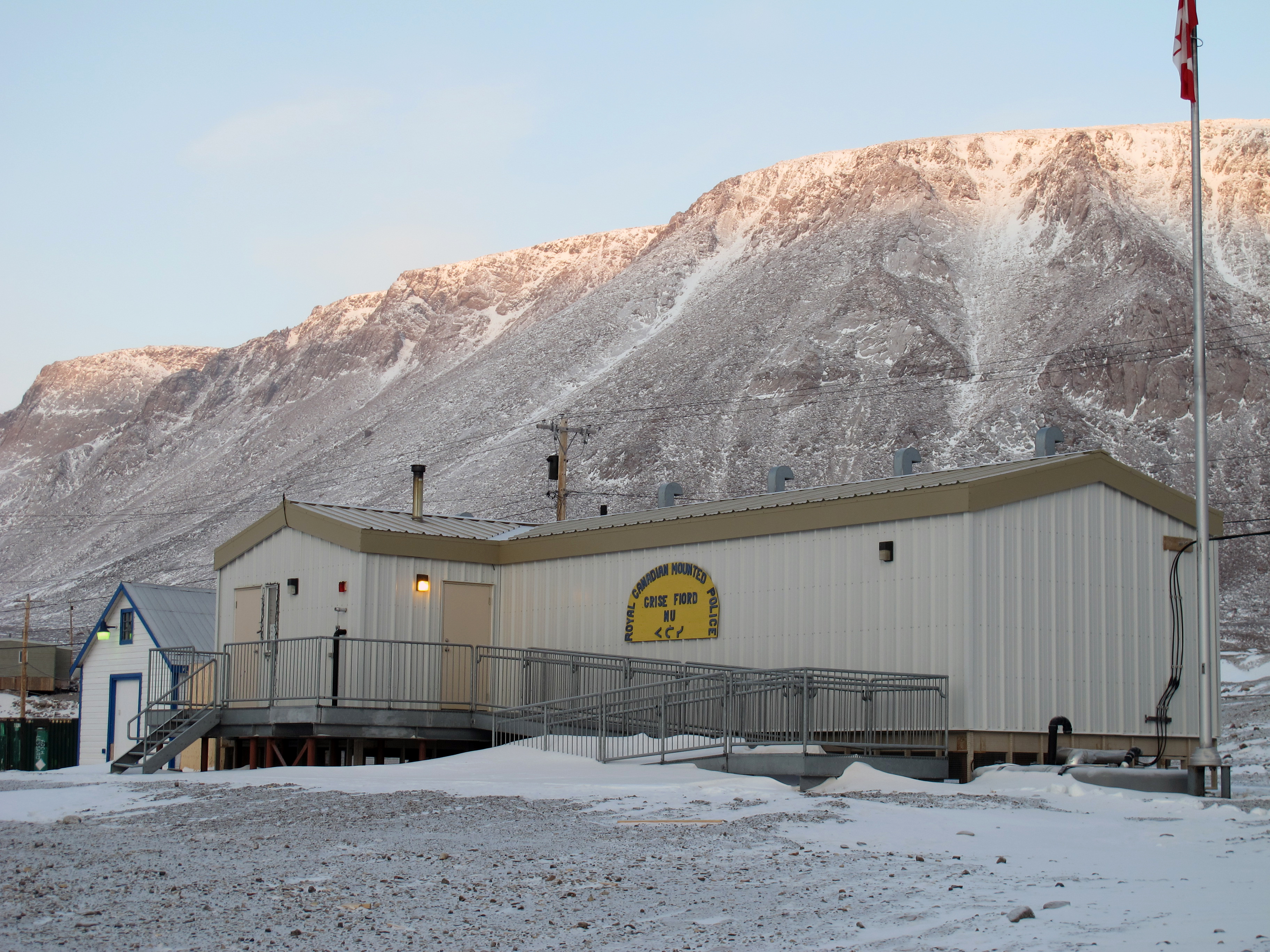
Canada's northernmost RCMP detachment

In 1970, Bell Canada established what was then the world's most northerly telephone exchange (operated since 1992 by Northwestel). It is in the 867 area code (formerly 819 before October 1997) with its only exchange code of 980.

Since 2005, the community has been served by the Qiniq network, a fixed wireless service to homes and businesses that connects to the outside world via a satellite backbone. In 2017, the network, designed and operated by SSI Micro, was upgraded to 4G LTE technology and 2G-GSM for mobile voice. In 2019, Bell Mobility became available to Grise Fiord.

=== Crime and safety ===
A Simon Fraser University study of Royal Canadian Mounted Police (RCMP) activity in the Baffin Region states that Grise Fiord had the lowest rate of criminal offences of all communities examined in 1992, and cites a 1994 Statistics Canada survey indicating that the hamlet has the highest perception of personal safety.

== Notable people ==
- P.J. Akeeagok, 6th premier of Nunavut

== See also ==
- List of municipalities in Nunavut
- Florin Fodor, a Romanian who was arrested trying to enter Canada illegally via Grise Fiord in September 2006.
