= Northern Quebec =

Region of Quebec, Canada

Northern Quebec (French: le nord du Québec) is a geographic term denoting the northerly, more remote and less populated parts of the Canadian province of Quebec.

The term has two related, overlapping but not identical usages; depending on the context, it may refer specifically to the administrative region of Nord-du-Québec, or to a broader geographic area also inclusive of the administrative regions of Abitibi-Témiscamingue and Côte-Nord, and the more northerly and remote portions of the administrative regions of Outaouais, Laurentides, Lanaudière, Saguenay–Lac-Saint-Jean and Mauricie. In the broadest sense, the term may be applied to almost any community further north than the densely populated Gatineau to Quebec City corridor along the north side of the St. Lawrence River; it is, however, never used to denote communities on the southern side of the river, even in the northernmost portions of the Gaspé Peninsula.
