= Pasatono Orquesta =

- Genres: Traditional music of Oaxaca
- Years active: 1998– present
- Website: pasatono.com

Pasatono Orquesta (Orchestra) is an eight-member ensemble of ethnomusicologists dedicated to rescuing and performing traditional Oaxacan music, especially that of the Mixtec region, and to promote it by adding more modern arrangements and influences. It was founded by three Oaxacan students at the Escuela Nacional de Música (National Music School) in Mexico City, who found that their traditional music was not taught at the school. They have been promoted by Lila Downs, have released four albums, and have toured the United States, playing in venues such as Lincoln Center in New York and Kennedy Center in Washington D.C. In Mexico, they have played in venues in Mexico City and Oaxaca, as well as the Festival Internacional Cervantino.

== The ensemble ==
With a name that refers to a kind of violin maker in Oaxaca, the ensemble's purpose is to rescue, preserve and reinterpret the sounds of indigenous village bands in the state of Oaxaca, especially those of the Mixtec people. They play traditional instruments such as violins, clarinets, trumpets, guitars as well as local instruments in danger of disappearing such as the bajo fondo, a ten-stringed guitar made in only a few villages in Oaxaca and the Oaxaca jarana, which differs from the better-known Veracruz version. It is smaller with five strings, most often used to play chilenas.

Pasatono recreates the rural orchestra that was popular from the end of the 19th century to the middle of the 20th. All members are ethnomusicologists, and are dedicated to researching traditional Oaxacan and Mixtec music, as well as performance, compositions and the dissemination of knowledge about native musical traditions. Much of this research involves traveling to rural communities in Oaxaca, as well as Mixtec communities in neighboring Guerrero and Puebla.

The rural village orchestra was once very common in rural Mexico, with those in Oaxaca mixing indigenous, European and African musical traditions. Much of it is based on European melodies instruments introduced during the colonial period, but African and indigenous rhythms can also be heard. In addition, these bands were also influenced by musical innovations of the 19th and early 20th century, for example the American jazz that was heard when wireless radio reached Oaxaca in the 1920s and 1930s. In total, pieces played by these ensembles can have influences from danzón, rumba, gypsy music, polka, pasodoble, marching bands, mazurka, swing, big band and foxtrot. Many of these influences have remained here long after going out of fashion in their places of origin. However, this music is in danger of disappearing as more modern musical styles do not use these instruments, and younger generations learn to play it or the instruments.

Current members of the ensemble include:

- Patricia García López on the obbligato violin
- (director) Rubén Luengas Pérez on Bajo quinto and vocals
- Edgar Serralde Mayer on Oaxaca jarana and vocals
- Verónica Acevedo on second violin
- Jorge Martínez Jiménez on clarinet
- Eloy Pérez Velázquez on baritone horn
- Sergio Martínez on double bass
- Pablo Márquez on percussion

== Repertoire ==
Their music is festive with a touch of nostalgia, with works that generally focus more on instrumentals than voice. To keep this music relevant, Pasatono plays new arrangements of traditional works as well as new compositions, adding more modern influences. The 2014 album Maroma, shows a very wide mix which includes jazz, chilena, polka and cumbia. The Maroma album is dedicated to the music of one-man circuses, called maromas, that roamed late 19th century rural Mexico. Basically the act consisted of single clowns who told jokes, juggled, performed some acrobatics, and sometimes even recited poetry. The music for these shows was played by local village string bands, and these compositions are recreated on the album.

They have also worked with other artists of other traditions, such as the New York-based group Golem, which describes itself as an Eastern European folk-punk band. They have produced music videos and live concerts have had elements of performance, e.g. working with a marmero clown and a tightrope walker. However, not all support their efforts at reinterpretation, feeling that traditional music should not be changed.

== History ==
The Pasatono Orquesta began as simply Pasatono, founded by Rubén Luengas, his wife Patricia Garcia and Edgar Serralde as a trio in 1998. The three were ethnomusicology students at the Escuela Nacional de Música in Mexico City, with the aim of being researchers, not performers. Here Luengas noticed that the school taught various traditional music styles, but nothing from the state of Oaxaca, so the three friends started playing the music they grew up with in Oaxaca, finding it a respite from the hustle and bustle of Mexico City. Ten years later, they reorganized and added new members and instruments from the original three (violin, bajo quinto and cántaro), changing the name to Pasatono Orquesta, adding a full traditional orchestra of rural Oaxaca.

Their first album was Yaa Sii, which means “happy music,” and since then, they have been discovered and promoted by Oaxacan artist Lila Downs. Pasatonos has had the most success playing in the United States, Mexico City and their native Oaxaca. They have performed at venues such as Lincoln Center in New York, Kennedy Center in Washington D.C., Centro Nacional de las Artes Mexico City, the Getty Museum in Los Angeles, the Henestrosa Library and the Macedonio Alcalá Theater in Oaxaca, as well as Mixtec communities in Oaxaca such as El jicaral, Coicoyán de las Flores and Yucuquimi de Ocampo. In 2014, they performed at the Festival Internacional Cervantino.

The band and its work were featured on a television program called Tocando tierra on Mexico's Canal 22.

== Discography ==
- Maroma (2014)
- La tiricia
- Tonos de nube
- Yaa sii
