= Inukjuak =

Inukjuak ᐃᓄᒃᔪᐊᒃ, Inukjuaq, Inujjuaq
- Northern village municipality
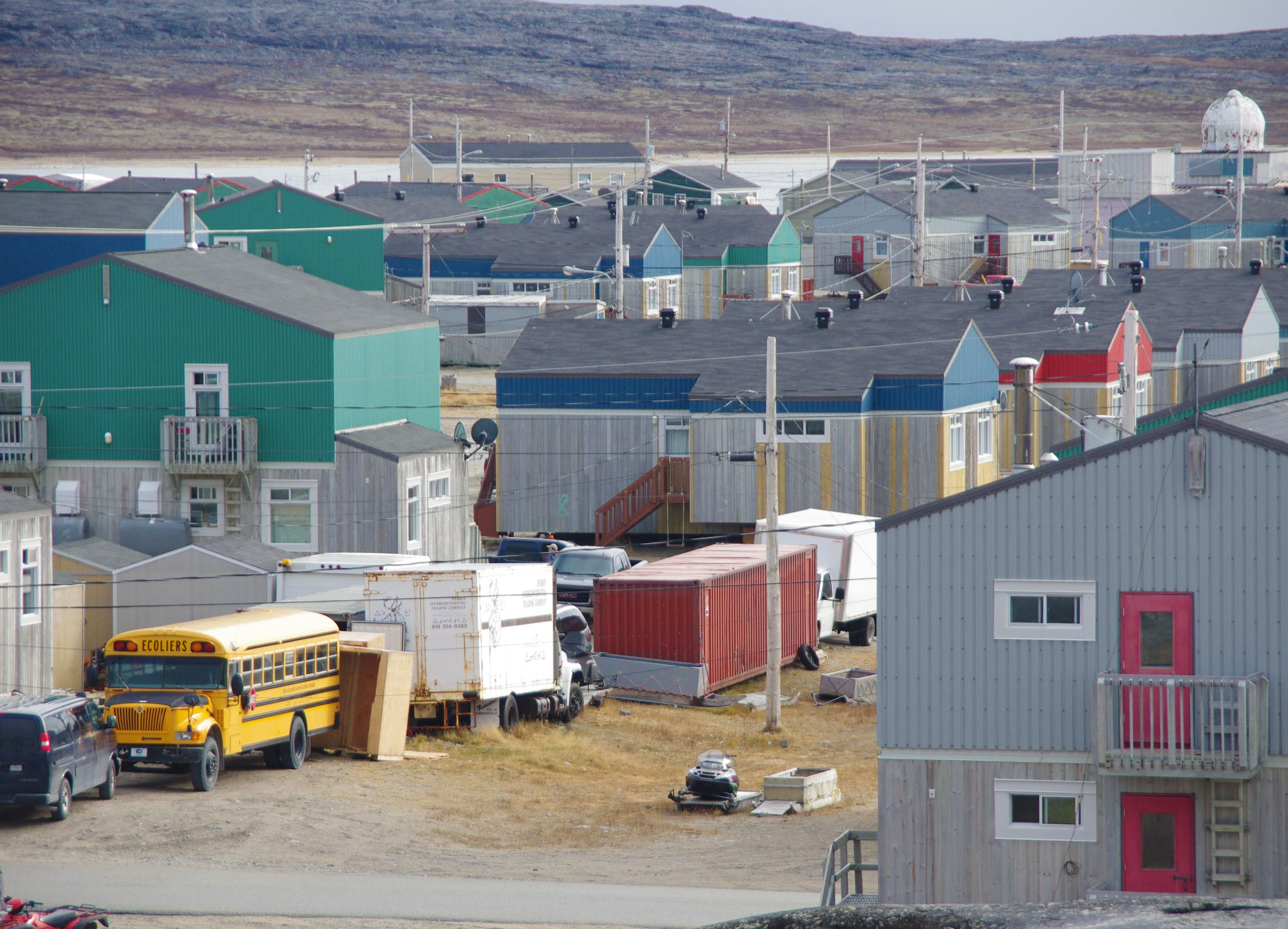

- Location within Quebec Location within Canada
- Coordinates: 58°27′N 78°06′W
- Country: Canada
- Province: Quebec
- Region: Nord-du-Québec
- TE: Kativik
- Constituted: 7 June 1980

Government
  - Mayor: Simeonie Nalukturuk
  - Federal riding: Abitibi—Baie-James—Nunavik—Eeyou
  - Prov. riding: Ungava

Area
  - Northern village municipality: 64.40 km^{2} (24.86 sq mi)
  - Land: 54.92 km^{2} (21.20 sq mi)
  - Urban: 3.33 km^{2} (1.29 sq mi)

Population (2021)
  - Northern village municipality: 1,821
  - Density: 33.2/km^{2} (86/sq mi)
  - Urban: 1,671
  - Urban density: 845.6/km^{2} (2,190/sq mi)
  - Change (2016–21): 3.6%
  - Dwellings: 588
- Time zone: UTC−05:00 (EST)
  - Summer (DST): UTC−04:00 (EDT)
- Postal code(s): J0M 1M0
- Area code: 819
- Website: www.nvinukjuak.ca

Inukjuak (Inuktitut: ᐃᓄᒃᔪᐊᒃ, Inujjuaq or Inukjuaq in Latin script, meaning 'The Giant') is a northern village (Inuit community) located on Hudson Bay at the mouth of the Innuksuak River in Nunavik, in the Nord-du-Québec region of northern Quebec, Canada. Its population is 1,821 as of the 2021 Canadian Census. An older spelling is Inoucdjouac; its former name was Port Harrison.

It is not accessible by road, but by boat in summer and year-round by air through Inukjuak Airport.

The police services for Inukjuak are provided by the Nunavik Police Service, which has one police station in the village.

== Etymology ==
'The Giant' is the literal translation of the word Inukjuak, but originally it was Inurjuat, which means "many people". In the past there was an Inuk (singular for the word Inuit) who went down to the river of Inukjuak to fetch some water. While there, the person saw many Inuit in kayaks approaching from the mouth of the river, and then yelled back out to the community "Inurjuat! Inurjuat!", where the name for the community comes from.

== History ==
The many archeological sites near Inukjuak indicate that the area has long been inhabited by the Inuit.

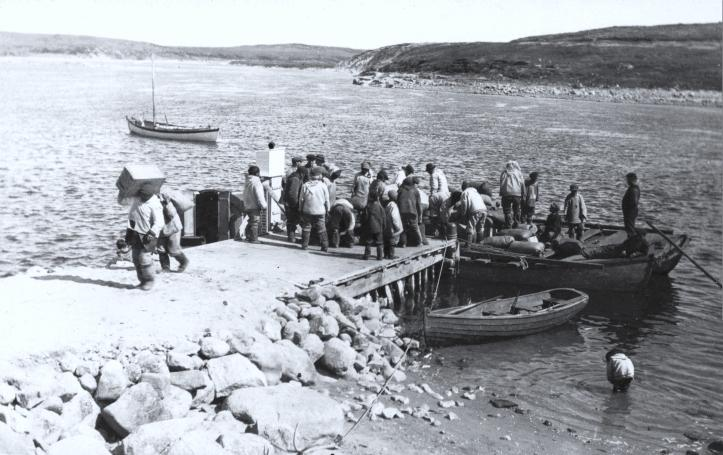
Port Harrison in 1922

At the beginning of the 20th century, the Révillon Frères company set up a fur trading post in Inukjuak, originally called Port Harrison. To compete with them, the Hudson's Bay Company (HBC) established a post in 1920. In the same year, Révillon Frères paid for Robert J. Flaherty to make Nanook of the North which was filmed between August 1920 and August 1921 in the area, including many scenes in the village which can be recognized at the present time

The HBC bought out Révillon Frères in 1936 and continued its trade monopoly here until 1958. In 1927 an Anglican mission was established, followed by a post office and Royal Canadian Mounted Police (RCMP) detachment in 1935, a nursing station in 1947, and a school in 1951. From this time on the Inuit started to give up their traditional nomadic way of life and live permanently in the community. A cooperative store was formed in 1962. Inukjuak was legally established as a municipality in 1980.

In 1953, the Canadian government controversially relocated some of the area's inhabitants to Resolute and Grise Fiord—then in the Northwest Territories, but now part of Nunavut. At the time, the relocation was described as a humanitarian gesture to save the lives of starving native people and enable them to continue a subsistence lifestyle. It was, in reality, a forced migration as part of a plan to establish a Canadian presence in the High Arctic and assert its sovereignty with human flagpoles. This relocation caused families to be split up and relocated persons faced hardships in the much more severe conditions of the far north.

Artist Leah Nuvalinga Qumaluk was born in Inukjuak in 1934.

== Geography ==
Despite its bitterly cold climate, Inukjuak is actually not very far north – especially for an area above the tree line. It is by North American standards located far south of warm-summer inland areas like Yellowknife and Fairbanks where vegetation thrives. Being on the 58th parallel it is located closer to the equator than cities like Stockholm, Oslo, Helsinki and Saint Petersburg, all of which have far gentler year-round climates. It is also on the same parallel as the extremely mild northern tip of mainland Scotland (Thurso). With the North American population centres being further south due to the cold climate it still lies far north of provincial centres Montreal and Quebec City, being located in the distant wilderness from the majority of Quebec's population. It also lies at a distance from Nunavik's largest population centre Kuujjuaq that is on a similar latitude but further to the east.

== Climate ==
Inukjuak has a subarctic climate (Köppen: Dfc), with a July average of 11.7 °C (53.1 °F) and February average of −25.4 °C (−13.7 °F). The climate is influenced by the freezing of the shallow Hudson Bay combined with extremely moderated summers with very pronounced seasonal lag as the bay thaws. As a result, Inukjuak gets an extremely cold climate for the latitude, especially considering its maritime position. On similar latitudes in Scandinavia in northern Europe, or the northernmost tip of mainland Scotland the summers are close to 3 °C (5.4 °F) warmer and winters are around the freezing point – demonstrating the extreme chilliness of the climate.

For example, Stockholm is 13.6 °C (24.5 °F) warmer annually, in spite of being a full degree farther north. Maritime climates in northern Scotland such as Thurso even make the mark of being 15 °C (27 °F) milder annually on the same latitude. Even compared to geographically analogous locations in the Russian Far East, Inukjuak has an annual mean 0.5 °C (0.90 °F) colder than Aldan and 3.3 °C (5.9 °F) colder than Magadan, whilst receiving about an hour less sunshine each day than those two localities. Due to the cold summers, Inukjuak is above the tree line despite lying more than 3,500 km (2,200 mi) from the pole. Inukjuak also is significantly colder than locations located substantially further north with warm-summer subarctic climates, being 1.7 °C (3.1 °F) colder than Yellowknife, 3.6 °C (6.5 °F) colder than Fairbanks, and 5.9 °C (10.6 °F) colder than Whitehorse.

Temperatures in Inukjuak are below freezing from mid-October to late May – the pronounced seasonal lag means May averages colder than October, April colder than November, and March colder than December. Only during a freakish warm wave on 5 December 1923 has Inukjuak recorded a temperature above 10 °C (50 °F) between November and April, while January has only topped freezing in 1940. During the early winter snowfall is very heavy, averaging 50 cm (20 in) in November but tapering off somewhat as the freezing of Hudson Bay completes and reduces the availability of moisture. The most monthly snowfall has been 155 cm (61 in) in November 1933 and the most in one day 43 cm (17 in) on 11 November 1934, whilst the highest depth of snow on the ground has been 179 cm (70 in) on 14 April 1955.

Snow usually melts when temperatures rise above freezing late in May, with typically only 7 cm (2.8 in) remaining on the ground at the beginning of June. Summer weather in Inukjuak, due to the cool Hudson Bay and prevailing cyclonic weather, is generally damp and unsettled, with rainfall especially frequent in August and September as the bay thaws completely: these months expect rain on more than half the days. Occasional spells of hot weather occur when the wind drives air from the hotter continent onto the coast: the record high temperature is 30 °C (86 °F) on 8 June 1955. By the end of September temperatures are already falling to near freezing and October sees the beginning of the long winter and a return to heavy snow driven by the western side of the Icelandic Low.

Climate data for Inukjuak (Inukjuak Upper Air) WMO ID: 71907; coordinates 58°28′N 78°05′W; elevation: 24.4 m (80 ft); 1991–2020 normals, extremes 1921–present
| Month | Jan | Feb | Mar | Apr | May | Jun | Jul | Aug | Sep | Oct | Nov | Dec | Year |
|---|---|---|---|---|---|---|---|---|---|---|---|---|---|
| Record high humidex | 1.6 | 2.4 | 4.4 | 8.4 | 26.5 | 32.4 | 34.0 | 28.9 | 30.0 | 17.5 | 7.2 | 2.6 | 34.0 |
| Record high °C (°F) | 1.9 (35.4) | 5.0 (41.0) | 4.8 (40.6) | 9.6 (49.3) | 26.8 (80.2) | 30.0 (86.0) | 30.0 (86.0) | 27.6 (81.7) | 27.1 (80.8) | 16.7 (62.1) | 8.3 (46.9) | 16.1 (61.0) | 30.0 (86.0) |
| Mean daily maximum °C (°F) | −19.9 (−3.8) | −21.1 (−6.0) | −15.4 (4.3) | −6.6 (20.1) | 1.8 (35.2) | 10.3 (50.5) | 15.9 (60.6) | 14.3 (57.7) | 8.8 (47.8) | 3.0 (37.4) | −3.2 (26.2) | −11.6 (11.1) | −2.0 (28.4) |
| Daily mean °C (°F) | −23.5 (−10.3) | −25.4 (−13.7) | −19.8 (−3.6) | −10.9 (12.4) | −1.5 (29.3) | 5.8 (42.4) | 11.4 (52.5) | 10.7 (51.3) | 6.1 (43.0) | 0.7 (33.3) | −6.4 (20.5) | −15.3 (4.5) | −5.7 (21.7) |
| Mean daily minimum °C (°F) | −27.2 (−17.0) | −29.5 (−21.1) | −24.6 (−12.3) | −15.3 (4.5) | −4.8 (23.4) | 1.3 (34.3) | 6.9 (44.4) | 7.1 (44.8) | 3.4 (38.1) | −1.7 (28.9) | −9.6 (14.7) | −18.9 (−2.0) | −9.4 (15.1) |
| Record low °C (°F) | −46.1 (−51.0) | −49.4 (−56.9) | −45.0 (−49.0) | −35.2 (−31.4) | −25.6 (−14.1) | −9.4 (15.1) | −6.7 (19.9) | −2.8 (27.0) | −11.1 (12.0) | −22.8 (−9.0) | −33.9 (−29.0) | −43.3 (−45.9) | −49.4 (−56.9) |
| Record low wind chill | −60.3 | −57.7 | −54.8 | −45.6 | −36.3 | −15.5 | −6.6 | 0.0 | −11.7 | −30.7 | −46.9 | −55.4 | −60.3 |
| Average precipitation mm (inches) | 14.4 (0.57) | 11.6 (0.46) | 15.5 (0.61) | 22.6 (0.89) | 27.0 (1.06) | 38.2 (1.50) | 60.1 (2.37) | 61.1 (2.41) | 70.1 (2.76) | 58.6 (2.31) | 50.6 (1.99) | 30.3 (1.19) | 459.9 (18.11) |
| Average rainfall mm (inches) | 0.0 (0.0) | 0.1 (0.00) | 0.1 (0.00) | 3.6 (0.14) | 12.6 (0.50) | 33.6 (1.32) | 59.5 (2.34) | 61.1 (2.41) | 62.2 (2.45) | 28.2 (1.11) | 3.2 (0.13) | 0.4 (0.02) | 264.6 (10.42) |
| Average snowfall cm (inches) | 15.0 (5.9) | 12.0 (4.7) | 16.1 (6.3) | 19.4 (7.6) | 14.6 (5.7) | 4.4 (1.7) | 1.0 (0.4) | 0.0 (0.0) | 7.5 (3.0) | 32.6 (12.8) | 50.0 (19.7) | 32.0 (12.6) | 204.5 (80.5) |
| Average precipitation days (≥ 0.2 mm) | 10.7 | 9.1 | 9.1 | 10.0 | 11.3 | 10.7 | 12.8 | 15.1 | 18.9 | 20.4 | 20.6 | 15.1 | 163.8 |
| Average rainy days (≥ 0.2 mm) | 0.09 | 0.04 | 0.09 | 1.2 | 4.5 | 8.5 | 12.8 | 15.1 | 16.2 | 8.6 | 1.2 | 0.13 | 68.5 |
| Average snowy days (≥ 0.2 cm) | 10.8 | 9.2 | 9.3 | 9.9 | 8.4 | 3.6 | 0.26 | 0.13 | 5.0 | 15.6 | 20.3 | 15.3 | 107.8 |
| Average relative humidity (%) (at 1500 LST) | 75.4 | 75.0 | 77.8 | 80.9 | 78.4 | 67.0 | 65.0 | 72.9 | 78.3 | 81.9 | 85.6 | 82.7 | 76.7 |
| Mean monthly sunshine hours | 63.5 | 122.5 | 182.5 | 183.2 | 159.4 | 209.4 | 226.0 | 171.7 | 97.9 | 50.4 | 31.8 | 35.2 | 1,533.5 |
| Percentage possible sunshine | 28.6 | 46.7 | 49.9 | 42.5 | 30.6 | 38.4 | 41.6 | 36.0 | 25.4 | 15.8 | 13.4 | 17.5 | 32.2 |
Source: Environment and Climate Change Canada (rain/rain days, snow/snow days, precipitation/precipitation days and sun 1971–2000)

== Demographics ==
In the 2021 Census of Population conducted by Statistics Canada, Inukjuak had a population of 1,821 living in 481 of its 588 total private dwellings, a change of 3.6% from its 2016 population of 1,757. With a land area of 54.92 km^{2} (21.20 sq mi), it had a population density of 33.2/km^{2} (85.9/sq mi) in 2021.

== Education ==
The Kativik School Board operates

- the Innalik primary school
- the Uquutaq high school
- and the Vocational Education at Nunavimmi Pigiursavik Centre. Adl.

== Notable people ==
- Isa Paddy Aqiattusuk, artist
- asinnajaq, artist, writer, filmmaker, and curator
- Larry Audlaluk, activist and writer
- Melissa Haney, pilot
- Charlie Inukpuk, artist
- Adamie Niviaxie, sculptor
- Annie Niviaxie, sculptor
- Leah Nuvalinga Qumaluk, artist
- Taamusi Qumaq, historian, writer, and politician
- Isa Smiler, artist
