= Shonfield =

Shonfield is a surname. Notable people with the surname include:

- Andrew Shonfield (1917-1981), British economist, husband of Zuzanna, father of Katherine
- Katherine Shonfield (1954-2003), British architect, daughter of Andrew and Zusanna
- Zuzanna Shonfield (1919-1941), Polish-born British writer and historian, wife of Andrew, mother of Katherine
