= Kenneth Saltmarche =

Canadian museum director, artist (1920–2003)

- Born: Kenneth Charles Saltmarche; September 29, 1920; Cardiff, Wales
- Died: July 3, 2003 (aged 83); Toronto, Ontario, Canada
- Education: Ontario College of Art, Toronto
- Known for: Artist, arts administrator, cultural leader and art critic
- Spouse: Judith Ann Saltmarche (d. 1992)
- Awards: LLD, University of Windsor (1982)

Kenneth Saltmarche (Ken) LL. D. (September 29, 1920 – July 3, 2003) was a Canadian museum director and artist. He was a crucial figure in developing the existence of the Art Gallery of Windsor (now Art Windsor-Essex) and its collection, and served the gallery for nearly 40 years (1946–1985). In his lengthy stay, his career was not unlike two of his artist-peers in Canadian art, Clare Bice, director of Museum London (1940–1972) and T. R. MacDonald of the Art Gallery of Hamilton (1947–1973).

== Early life ==
Kenneth Saltmarche was born in Cardiff, Wales, UK. He moved to Windsor, Ontario with his parents in 1924 and studied art in Detroit and with a Windsor artist in 1945, then attended the Ontario College of Art in Toronto where he studied and worked with Franklin Carmichael and contemporaries Yvonne McKague Housser and John Martin Alfsen.

== Career ==
Saltmarche was placed in charge of operations of the Art Gallery of Windsor in 1946 (it had been founded on the top floor of the Willistead Manor in Windsor, Ontario in 1943). He became director of what was then called the Willistead Art Gallery of Windsor from 1960 to 1969, then director of the Art Gallery of Windsor. He was instrumental in making the gallery an independent institution (until 1959, it was governed by the Windsor Public Library Board) and in building the gallery collection. His focus throughout his nearly 40 years with the gallery was on building a community presence for a public art gallery in Windsor. He staged events such as Art in the Park and juried shows, mostly for the community, as well as originating shows of Canadian art, especially aided by curator Ted Fraser who joined him at the gallery in the mid-1970s.

In 1982, Saltmarche wrote a book titled A collection of humorous sketches from a personal book of hours – and hours and hours – in hospital, published in Windsor, Ontario by Poor Me Products. That same year, he was awarded an Honorary Doctorate by the University of Windsor.

== Art ==
Saltmarche was renowned especially as a portrait artist. His work is in the collection of Art Windsor-Essex as well as the University of Windsor. In 1993, his retrospective was held at the Art Gallery of Windsor, curated by Catharine Mastin with a catalogue she authored with Megan Bice and William Withrow.

In 2013, Art Windsor-Essex organized The Saltmarche Soirée & Live Auction A Fundraiser to Benefit the Art Gallery of Windsor, a sale or the Saltmarche's art and collection. In 2018, Chris Finn, the gallery curator, presented Kenneth Saltmarche: Dedicated Visions, an exhibition which again examined Saltmarche's art.

== Personal life ==
His twin sons, Noel and David, born in 1949, died of cancer in 2011.
