= Katherine Clarke =

Katherine Clarke may refer to:

- Katherine Clarke (artist)
- Katherine Clarke (historian)

== See also ==
- Katherine Clark
- Catherine Clarke (disambiguation)
- Catherine Clark (disambiguation)
