= Clare Bice =

Canadian author (1909–1976)

- Born: January 24, 1909; Durham, Ontario
- Died: May 18, 1976 (aged 67); Newfoundland
- Resting place: Woodland Cemetery, London, Ontario
- Occupations: Author, artist, administrator
- Writing career
- Genre: Children's Literature

Albert Clare Bice CM RCA (January 24, 1909 – May 18, 1976) was a Canadian artist, curator, and children's book author/illustrator. He was curator/director of what is now called Museum London from 1940 to 1972. In his long-term stay, he was not unlike Kenneth Saltmarche who was at the Art Gallery of Windsor (now called Art Windsor-Essex) (1946-1985) and T. R. MacDonald at the Art Gallery of Hamilton (1947–1973).

== Biography ==
Born in Durham, Ontario, and raised in London, he received a Bachelor of Arts degree in History and English from the University of Western Ontario in 1928. From 1930 to 1932, he studied at the Art Students League of New York and Grand Central School of Art in New York. He worked included landscape painting, portrait painting, and figure painting. From 1940 to 1972, he was the curator of the Williams Memorial Art Gallery and Museum (it was renamed the London Regional Art and Historical Museums and now is called the Museum London). He died on May 18, 1976, while on a sketching trip in Newfoundland.

== Recognition and awards ==
He was a member of the Ontario Society of Artists, Canada's oldest continuously operating art society. From 1967 to 1970, he was the president of the Royal Canadian Academy of Arts.

In 1973, he was made a Member of the Order of Canada "for his contribution to the fine arts as painter, author-illustrator and gallery director".

== Works ==
He was the author and illustrator of five children books: Jory's Cove (1941), Across Canada: Stories of Canadian Children (1949), The Great Island (1954), A Dog for Davie's Hill (1956), and Hurricane Treasure (1965). He also illustrated six books by Canadian writer Catherine Anthony Clark (1892–1977): The Golden Pine Cone (1950), The Sun Horse (1951), The One-Wing Dragon (1955), The Silver Man (1958), The Diamond Feather (1962), and The Hunter and the Medicine Man (1966).

Cultural offices
Preceded by Harold Beament	President of the Royal Canadian Academy of Arts; 1967-1970	Succeeded by John C. Parkin
