= Katherine Clarke (artist) =

British artist and designer

- Born: 1961 (age 64–65)

Katherine Clarke (born 1961) is a British artist and designer. Originally from Jersey but practising in London since the early 1980s, she is one of the founding members of muf architecture/art, a London-based practice of architects, artists and urban designers. Katherine unusually is at once practitioner, artist and theorist who brings her research based critical practice to both art commissions and the authoring of public space projects and urban strategies.

== Career ==
=== muf architecture/art ===
muf is a collaborative group of architects, artists and designers who specialise in the design of urban public spaces. The practice works with the public realm of architecture, addressing the spatial, social and economic infrastructures of the built environment.

Fior was involved with the muf project of a new town square for Barking, East London, for which they were awarded the 2008 European Prize for Public Space, a first for the UK. Their work is said to be process driven and Katherine worked extensively on the Venice Biennale and the Altab Ali Memorial in Whitechapel, engaging with the community to find a meaningful response to the site.

=== Academic ===
Katherine previously taught previously at the Architectural Association where she met Juliet Bidgood and Liza Fior, with whom she collaborated to create muf with Kath Schonfield. She has also taught at the Chelsea School of Art and University of East London.

=== Art ===
Katherine works in the medium of video. She has made video work as part of the research, development and description of each project in the studio, and contributes to the conceptual direction of projects. Her own independent work has been widely exhibited. She installed a large photography piece at the AA members room, depicting a horse which challenged traditional relationships of the viewer/viewed owner/owned.

=== Publications ===
- muf, "An Invisible Privilege," in Altering Practices: Feminist Politics and Poetics of Space, ed. Doina Petrescu (London: Routledge, 2007).
- muf and Katherine Vaughan Williams, "How do you do 'what you do' ?," in Architecture and Participation, ed. Peter Blundell Jones, Doina Petrescu, and Jeremy Till (London: Routledge, 2005).
- Liza Fior, Katherine Clarke, and Sophie Handler, "It's all about getting what you want - what we want is to make work that fits," Architectural Design 75, no. 2 (April 2005).
- muf, This Is What We Do: A Muf Manual (London: Ellipsis, 2001)
