= Fred Hagan =

Canadian artist (1918–2003)

Frederick Hagan
- Born: Robert Frederic Hagan; May 21, 1918; Toronto
- Died: September 6, 2003 (aged 85); Newmarket, Ontario
- Education: Ontario College of Art, Toronto with John Martin Alfsen and Franklin Carmichael (1936-1941); Art Students League, New York and at George C. Miller`s Lithography Shop, New York (1946)
- Spouse: Isabelle Heald
- Awards: Canadian Centennial Medal (1967); RCA Medal (1998);

Frederick Hagan (May 21, 1918 – September 6, 2003) was a Canadian lithographer, painter and art instructor.

== Early life and career ==
Fred Hagan was born in Toronto in the area known as "Cabbagetown". When he was 13 years old, his father died, leaving his mother with eight children to support, so he went to work in a paper-box factory to help the family. From a studio he created in the family garage, he sketched his neighborhood. He attended night school at Central Technical School, then continued to work in wood fabrication while studying at night at the Ontario College of Art, Toronto with John Martin Alfsen, his mentor, Franklin Carmichael, and Fred Haines (1936–1941).

Four of his drawings were selected to be hung at the 1939 New York World's Fair and that same year, he began to exhibit his work at the Royal Canadian Academy (he was awarded the RCA medal in 1998). In 1941, Hagan was the resident artist at Pickering College in Newmarket and taught evenings at the Northern Vocational School, Toronto (1945–1946). He eventually settled in Newmarket, and married Isabelle Heald.

In 1946, he studied at the Art Students League with Martin Lewis, and studied printmaking at George C. Miller's Lithography Workshop, New York. In 1946, he was hired to teach drawing, painting, and printmaking at the Ontario College of Art and he became head of printmaking at OCAD in 1955 until he retired in 1983.

During the summers, he recorded his family, friends and country life in his figurative paintings, providing a social commentary on life in Ontario in the 1940s. In 1967, he exhibited with other staff members of OCAD at Art Gallery of Brant. In 1977, he was given a retrospective at the Grimsby Public Library and Art Gallery, Ontario, titled Hagan, the mind and the hand: 1938-1976. Between 1986 and 1989, Hagan released "Exploration of Canada", a series of 16 stamps for Canada Post.

In 1967, he was awarded the Canadian Centennial Medal. He held memberships in the Canadian Society of Graphic Art (of which he was made an Honorary Member in 1965), the Canadian Society of Painter-Etchers and Engravers, the Ontario Society of Artists, and the Print and Drawing Council of Canada. His work is in the collections of the Art Gallery of Ontario, the National Gallery of Canada, the Art Gallery of Hamilton, the Glenbow Museum, and numerous other Canadian galleries. He is represented by Bau-Xi Gallery in Toronto.

Frederick Hagan died in Newmarket, Ontario, September 6, 2003. Fred Hagen Court in Newmarket, Ontario is named for him. A plaque in his honour is located at 262 Ontario Street, Toronto. His papers are in the Art Gallery of Ontario E. P. Taylor Research Library and Archives.

Among his students was master printmaker J. C. Heywood.
