= Albert Chiarandini =

Visual artist

- Born: Umberto Chiarandini; September 30, 1915; Udine, Friuli, Italy
- Died: December 18, 2007 (aged 92); Toronto, Ontario, Canada
- Citizenship: Canadian
- Education: Ontario College of Art
- Known for: painter
- Elected: member of the OSA

Albert Chiarandini (September 30, 1915 – December 18, 2007) was an Italian-Canadian painter most closely associated with Group of Seven in his art.

His heritage includes 3,000 paintings, mostly in oil, in portraiture, landscapes, and compositions genres. As an art master, he influenced new generation artists, such as Giuseppe Pivetta (born. 1938) and Bruce Smith (1925-2005).

== Biography ==
Albert Chiarandini was born in Udine, Italy, in 1915. While Chiarandini was still a little child, his family, including his mother and brother, took shelter in a refugee camp in southern Italy. As a result, the boy suffered severe illness, including infections that permanently affected his sight in one eye. When Chiarandini returned to Chiavris, then the outskirts of Udine, he took early interest in painting. He had to make his own paintbrushes from bristles cut from the brushes used to whitewash the outside walls of the shed behind the house (or, as legend has it, from his father's shaving brush), using the side wall of the shed as a canvas. He attended school and studied art in the city, completing the third year of the High School for Professional Development. Chiarandini studied under the sculptor Luigi Moro (1881-1946).

In 1932, he left fascist Italy with his brother and mother to reunite with the father, who, after fighting in World War I, ended up in Toronto. In Canada, Chiarandini attended the Ontario College of Art, where he received scholarships and completed the program with honours. In 1960, he moved to Yorkville, Toronto.

For a few years, Chiarandini had to labor in the construction industry at the expense of the creative work. Later, in one of his diaries, he expressed regret that he could not devote himself full-time to the art. Meanwhile, his reputation as an artist continued to grow and he received numerous commissions to paint prominent citizens and university and hospital administrators. By the late 1950s, Chiarandini was already well-known as a master of portraiture. He worked at the Ontario College of Art as an instructor in portrait painting for a few years also teaching at Northern Secondary School. By his late eighties he continued to teach privately.

In the 1960s, he became an elected Fellow of the International Institute of Arts and Letters (F.I I A.L.) and an appointed member of the Ontario Society of Artists.

Albert Chiarandini died in Toronto in 2007.

== Art ==
Chiarandini created approximately 3,000 paintings, practically all in oil.

He did not embrace the then fashion for abstract painting and photorealism considering himself to be a more traditional figurative artist. The style Chiarandini adopted is a sort of symbolic realism based on the classics but influenced by Canadian movements. He created in several genres, including portraiture, rural landscapes, townscapes, and large compositions. Both Chiarandini painting style and techniques are close to the Group of Seven. And many critics noted that his works are at a level of mastery almost equal to the best works of the famous Canadian landscape artists.

Being under the influence of the hippie culture, the artist painted and painted a series of portraits of Yorkville bohemians who agreed to pose for him. Among them is David Fennario, later an acclaimed Montreal playwright.

Philosophically, Chiarandini held pessimistic views about society and life. His diary entries in the 1960s refer to humankind’s dishonesty and materialism. Chiarandini denounced the North American preoccupation with money and the "crazy world" of the mid-1980s. "Life is not easy" was the refrain he repeated during conversations and interviews in 2004. This worldview, which Chiarandini verbalized in diaries, also emerges in visual form from his paintings.

=== Influence ===
At his very first exhibition (1938), the artist's work was shown with representatives of the Group of Seven. Chiarandini was among the artists featured in the 2005 Ontario Celebrations for the Group of Seven, too.

His work was influenced by the post-impressionists such as Van Gogh, Matisse, and Cezanne. At Ontario College of Art, Chiarandini studied under the guidance of Frederick Challener, John Alfsen, and Franklin Carmichael, a member of the Group of Seven. Among the classics who influenced him was Titian.

=== Exhibitions and galleries ===
In 1938, Chiarandini had his first exhibit at the Art Gallery of Ontario in the company of members of the Group of Seven.

His works are represented in private and public collections around the world, including the Robert McLaughlin Gallery and the National Archives of Canada.

In 2004, a major collection of his paintings were donated to the Georgina Arts Centre and Gallery in Sutton, Ontario, as a part of The Group of Seven Project.

In 2015, on the occasion of the centennial of Chiarandini's birth, a series of exhibitions were held in Canada and Italy. A dozen of his portrait works from the Carrier Gallery, the Georgina Arts Centre and Gallery, the University of Ottawa, and private collections, were displayed at Gallery Gevik in Toronto. The Georgina Arts Centre & Gallery of Ontario has organized an exhibition in collaboration with the Canadian Cultural Center of the University of Udine.

In 2019, some of the painter's best-known works were featured in an exhibition at the Centaur Theatre in Montreal, Quebec.

One of Chiarandini's masterpieces is on display in Toronto City Hall.

== See also ==
- John Martin Alfsen
- A. Y. Jackson
- Edwin Holgate
