= Laura Millard =

Canadian artist (born 1961)

- Born: 1961; Calgary, Alberta
- Education: Alberta College of Art, Calgary (1979–1981); Bachelor of Fine Arts, Nova Scotia College of Art and Design (1981–1983); Master of Fine Arts, Concordia University, Montreal (1989–1992)
- Known for: multimedia artist, educator
- Website: lauramillard.com

Laura Millard RCA (born 1961) is a Canadian contemporary artist. She uses for her installations drawings and videos records of the marks left on the earth obtained from drones, such as traces of the tracks of skates and snowmobiles on ice in northern Canada in a long-term investigation of ways to reinvent the landscape tradition of Canada. She also is an educator with over many years of experience working at OCAD University (she began teaching there in 1995) and a writer; she lives and works in Toronto.

== Career ==
Millard was born in Calgary and attended the Alberta College of Art, Calgary (1970–1981). She received a BFA degree from NSCAD University in 1983 and an MFA degree from Concordia University, Montreal in 1992. She is an associate professor in the graduate program at OCAD University where she has worked since 1995. She also has lectured and taught at art galleries and universities across Canada. In 1998, she was the author of Algonquin Memories: Tom Thomson in Algonquin Park and she has written other books and articles.

== Work ==
Millard was initially a landscape painter. In 1999, in the Burlington Art Centre's Imagining An[other] Canada – Reconsidering images of Nationalism in the Canadian Landscape, curated by Carol Podedworny, Millard was said to be rethinking landscape. Over time, she brought together in her art the contradictory ways in which landscape could be seen, altered and represented, varying her approach for different exhibitions to try and reinvent the genre.

In 2004, she was said to have merged the arts of painting and photography to create a "highly evocative" body of work that concentrated on ice-frozen areas of the Bow River in Alberta. In 2016, in a group exhibition at Toronto's InterAccess Gallery, titled Once Is Nothing: A Drone Art Exhibition, she let a quadcopter fly at ankle height to record the leaves in Scarborough's Rouge Park for a video, Passing. In her solo exhibition trace at the McClure Gallery in Montreal in 2020, she used a drone to make drawings of the land below, marked them with different media, then printed selected images on fabric and used them in lightboxes which enveloped the viewer so that he or she could experience the place for themselves.

In 2024, Millard was part of the Arctic Circle Alumni Residency in the Arctic Archipelago of Svalbard. Among Millard's creations as a result were a suite of motion lamps that combined her photographs of disappearing glaciers with lamps that rotated thanks to heat convection from their bulbs.

== Exhibitions ==
Millard began showing her work as an artist in group exhibitions in 1987 in Calgary. Since then, she has participated in many group exhibitions both nationally and internationally. In 2017, her work was included in Every. Now. Then: reframing nationhood at the Art Gallery of Ontario in Toronto. In 2020, her work was shown in The Uncanny Outdoors at the MacLaren Art Centre, Barrie. She has had solo exhibitions at galleries across Canada and internationally including such exhibitions as Contrail, at the Where Where Exhibition Space, Beijing (2011); Crossing, at the Whyte Museum, Banff, Alberta (2019) and in 2020, trace, at the McClure Visual Arts Center, Montreal, Quebec.

== Selected collections ==
Her work is in the public collections Alberta Foundation for the Arts; the Glenbow Museum, Calgary, Alberta; the MacLaren Art Centre; and Museum London in London, Ontario.

== Awards ==
She is the recipient of grants from the Canada Council for the Arts, the Ontario Arts Council, and the Alberta Foundation for the Arts. Millard has done artists residencies in the Arctic Circle Residency in Svalbard and the Klondike Institute of Art and Culture in Dawson City, Yukon, and in Canada at the Banff Centre and NSCAD University. In 2011, she was inducted into the Royal Canadian Academy of Arts.

== Bibliography ==
- The Bow: living with a river. Toronto: Key Porter. 2004.
