= Arlette Carreau-Kingwell =

Canadian textile artist and painter

- Carreau-Kingwell with her work in 1974
- Born: 1917; Montreal, Quebec
- Died: January 7, 1994 (aged 76–77); Sarsfield, Ontario
- Occupations: Painter and textile artist

Arlette Carreau-Kingwell (1917–1994) was a Canadian painter and textile artist.

== Early life and education ==
Arlette Carreau-Kingwell was born in 1917 in Montreal, Quebec. She studied at the École des beaux-arts de Montréal, as well as interning in Denmark at Holbæk Ladegård.

She studied under Adrien Hébert, and learned printmaking at The Saidye Bronfman Centre when it had visual arts classes.

== Career ==
Her most notable work generally consisted of small batiks under glass, as well as larger wool (and sometimes fur) tapestries. She taught at the Université du Québec à Trois-Rivières

After a career of mostly tapestry work, she shifted focus to painting, though many of her paintings are now lost due to poor documentation.

== Awards and exhibitions ==
She was the recipient of the French prize for crafts at the 1971 Royal Canadian Academy of Arts exhibition. She exhibited at the Canadian Handicrafts Guild and the National Gallery of the Montreal Museum of Fine Arts, and won the Molinari-Gaucher Award at the Royal Canadian Academy. Her work appeared in museums in Montreal, Halifax, and Charlottetown in Canada, as well as in French Africa, France, and Belgium. She displayed in Expo 67 inside the Habitat

In 1987 she participated in the HOMMAGE exhibition at the Galerie d'art du Parc in Trois-Rivières, an exhibition of 80 artists who had previously exhibited there on its 15th anniversary.
