= Kirsten Abrahamson =

Canadian ceramic artist

Kirsten Lillian Abrahamson is a Canadian ceramic artist.

== Personal background ==
She was born in Cleveland, Ohio, in 1960. She moved to Canada with her family at the beginning of her high school years and subsequently became a Canadian citizen. After completing high school, she moved to Calgary, Alberta, to study at the Alberta College of Art and Design where she earned Diplomas in Ceramics and Glassblowing. In 1984 and 1985, she attended the summer sessions in Ceramics at The Banff School of Fine Arts, Banff, Alberta. She then attended the University of Calgary from which she earned a Bachelor of Fine Arts (Ceramics) in 1987 and Master of Fine Arts (Sculpture) in 1990. Subsequently, she was an artist in residence at the Alberta College of Art and Design, and later at the Banff Centre. Her career evolved as an artist and as an instructor at post-secondary institutions.

== Body of work ==
Abrahamson's work was influenced by a sojourn in Mexico in 1993, where she and a colleague experienced the Day of the Dead festival. Out of that experience, she and her colleague created a special exhibition entitled Revival shown at the Muttart Gallery. Subsequently, they had a second exhibition, Days of the Dead at The New Gallery in Calgary. Abrahamson portrayed the symbolism of this festival.

Through her extensive course of studies in ceramic art, Kirsten Abrahamson has both an understanding of ceramic traditions and the formal skills in ceramic arts developed from the 19th through to the 21st century. Her foremost work, Diary of a River, has been the subject of critical analysis.

That work was reviewed in a short book by Carol Podedworny. Podedworny observed that Abrahamson's work reflects the California Funk and Bay Area Ceramics traditions and that Abrahamson's "bold, satirical and colourful leanings are reflected in her narrative and figurative works that have a strong personal introspective penchant". The use of low-fire clay and glazes permit the construction of large objects and brighter colours.

Similarly, Virginia Eichorn's article, about Diary of a River, featured in ESPACE SCULPTURE, observed that Abrahamson's studio work takes an autobiographical approach in the creation of ceramic art that reflects the themes in her life. Diary of a River was subsequently acquired by the Alberta Foundation for the Arts as part of its permanent collection. A number of her other works have been also been acquired by the Alberta Foundation for the Arts.

Abrahamson's ceramic art is illustrated and exemplified in several ceramics texts. One of these is Gail Crawford's book Studio Ceramics in Canada, a standard reference text published with the assistance of the Gardiner Museum, the only museum in Canada dedicated to ceramic art. The text discusses and illustrates Canadian ceramic art work and ceramic artists in Canada. Kirsten Abrahamson's glazing work has also been used for illustrative purposes in two books by professional studio potter Robin Hopper. In 2012 her work was featured by the Jonathon Bancroft-Snell Gallery's promotion in Ceramics Monthly.

Kirsten Abrahamson's works were represented in 5 of the 10 National Biennial of Ceramics exhibitions. At the 10th Biennial she was awarded the "Prix Du Public". During its 20-year history, this exhibition was a juried national ceramics show. At its 10th and final exhibition, the participants were selected by curators who invited submissions from artists in each of four regions.

== Awards ==
Abrahamson's work has been recognized by the awards or prizes in these venues,

- University of Calgary Art Department 50th Anniversary One of 30 Alumni honoured during the University of Calgary anniversary by display of their works at Nickle Gallery, September 2016.
- Prix du Public awarded at the 10th National Biennial of Ceramics at Trois-Riviers, Quebec in 2002
- Distinguished Alumni Award of Excellence granted in honour of the 75th anniversary of the Alberta College of Art and Design in 2002
- Awarded 2nd Prize in Fit for a King juried exhibition displayed at the Gardiner Museum, Toronto in 1992.

== Collections ==
Her work has been acquired by individuals and collected in private and public galleries. The works of Kirsten Abrahamson are held in the permanent collections of the following institutions;

- The Burlington Art Centre, Burlington, Ontario
- The Banff Centre for the Arts, Banff, Alberta
- The Nickle Arts Museum at the University of Calgary, Calgary, Alberta
- The Claridge Collection, Montreal, Quebec
- The Alberta Foundation for the Arts, Edmonton, Alberta
- Alberta College of Art + Design Permanent Collection, Calgary, Alberta
- The City of Calgary Civic Art Collection, Calgary, Alberta (housed at the Triangle Gallery)

== Exhibitions ==
Her work has been given wide public exposure and has been included in several international shows in the United States (in San Diego, California; Minneapolis, Minnesota; New York, New York and; San Angelo, Texas ) and overseas; in Taipei, Taiwan; and Prague, Czechoslovakia.

=== Solo exhibitions ===
- Queue Jonathon Bancroft Snell Gallery, October 2015
- Her epic work Diary: of a River, first shown at the Illingworth Kerr Gallery Calgary, subsequently traveled to the London Regional Museum and Art Gallery at London, Ontario, and thereafter to the University of Waterloo Gallery in Waterloo, Ontario, during 2004–2005.
- The 2002 Feature exhibition at the Harbinger Gallery of Waterloo.
- The 1994 Revival exhibition at the Muttart Gallery (now the Art Gallery of Calgary).
- Her Personal Mythologies exhibition presented in 1990 at The Nickle Arts Museum of the University of Calgary.
- The Personal Mythologies of Dee Dee Alteridem shown in 1990 at the University of Calgary Little Gallery.
- Accidental Solo exhibited in 1989 at the Canadian Art Gallery of Calgary.
- I Love A Parade presented by the Muttart Gallery (now the Art Gallery of Calgary).

== See also ==
List of Canadian artists

== Bibliography ==
Publications referencing the work of Kirsten Abrahamson;

- Chaytor, K and Krueger, J ed. Relational Learning: ACAD Ceramics Visiting Artists The First 3 Decades, ACAD Ceramics, Calgary, Alberta, 2017
- Eichorn, Virginia Diary of a River ESPACE SCULPTURE, Vol. 75, p 39-40, Spring 2006
- Podedworny, Carol Diary of a River Illingworth Kerr Gallery, 2005 - 7 pages
- Crawford, Gail Studio Ceramics in Canada, Gardiner Museum of Ceramic Art, Goose Lane Editions, 2005, p. 215
- miniARTure Sample of work The Triangle Gallery 2004
- Hopper, Robin Making Marks, Iola: Krause Publications, 2004
- Hopper, Robin The Ceramic Spectrum, 2nd Ed., Iola: Krause Publications, 2001
- Shea, Melissa Dead Dudes in Mexican Duds, Gauntlet, p. 21 Oct. 1999
- Tousley, Nancy Critics Pick, The Calgary Herald, Oct. 6, 1999.
- Laviolette, Mary-Beth Oeuvre The Top: Ceramic Artist Kirsten Abrahamson Walks a Tight Line Between the Exuberant and the Absurd, Avenue, 8-9 Dec. 1997
- Auth ukn The Lighter Side of Death, Where, p. 12. (Calgary) Oct. 1994
- Walton, Mark REVIVAL: Abrahamson and Strakowski, Muttart Gallery Newsletter, Volume 6, Issue 5. Sept./Oct., 1994
- Abercrombie, Nora The Mexican Connection, Arts Bridge, Vol. 3, No. 2, Issue 8, 4. Fall 1994
- Walton, Mark Death Stalks the Muttart, Artichoke, Vol.6, No.3, Fall/Winter, 1994
- Ylitalo, Kathryn Kirsten Abrahamson, Visual Arts Newsletter, Vol.11, No. 9, Issue 53, p. 4. Feb. 1990,
- Tousley, Nancy Art College Exhibit a Show of Strength, Calgary Herald, p. C7 Sept. 27, 1985
- Tousley, Nancy Sculptor Pokes Fun at Tourists, Calgary Herald, April 1985
