= Catherine Clark =

Catherine Clark may refer to:

- Catherine Clark (broadcaster)
- Catherine Clark (sports administrator)
- Catherine Clark Kroeger, American writer, professor
- Catherine Anthony Clark, Canadian children's author

== See also ==
- Catherine Clarke (disambiguation)
- Katherine Clarke (disambiguation)
- Katherine Clark
