= Catherine Clarke =

Catherine Clarke may refer to:

- Catherine Clarke (academic), British historian, professor at the Institute of Historical Research
- Catherine Clarke Fenselau (born 1939), American scientist working in mass spectrometry
- Catherine Freitag Clarke, American biochemist
- Catherine Goddard Clarke, American writer, educator and religious leader

== See also ==
- Catherine Clark (disambiguation)
- Katherine Clarke (disambiguation)
