= Ed Bartram =

Canadian artist (1938–2019)

- Born: Edward John Bartram; March 21, 1938; London, Ontario, Canada
- Died: August 25, 2019 (aged 81); Toronto, Ontario, Canada
- Education: essentially self-taught as an artist with help from Herb Arris (1958); Vera Frenkel at University of Toronto, Toronto, Ont. studied etching (1960); Telesforas Valius at Central Technical School, Toronto, Ont. studied etching (1965–1968); J. C. Heywood (1970s)
- Known for: Printmaking, painting
- Awards: Royal Canadian Academy 1976; Ontario Society of Artists 1971; Ontario Arts Council Publication & Purchase Award 1974

Ed Bartram RCA (March 21, 1938 – August 25, 2019), also known as Edward or Ted Bartram, was a Canadian artist who was known for capturing the rockscape of Georgian Bay through printmaking, painting and photography.

== Career ==
Ed Bartram, born in London, Ontario, had a B.A., University of Western Ontario and an M.A. Art & Archeology, University of Toronto; but was largely self-taught as an artist. He had help in learning about painting and the processes of printmaking from many individuals. Among them, he counted Herb Arris from whom he took evening classes at H. B. Beal Secondary School in London, Ontario (1958), Vera Frenkel at the University of Toronto (1960) and Telesforas Valius at Central Technical School, Toronto (1965–1968), with both of whom he studied etching. J. C. Heywood advised him on creating tonal effects in the 1970s.

In the 1950s, on a canoe trip to Georgian Bay with his friends, he discovered Bartram Island (named after him in 1991) which he bought around 1965. Although in the 1960s, he had experimented with what he learned from Frenkel and Valius, making abstract prints and paintings, around 1970, on the island, he had a revelation. In Georgian Bay, he was surrounded by abstract rock surfaces that revealed the passage of time. He conceived of the scene as providing a metaphor for the way he made prints since in using an etching plate and gouging and scraping it, he felt he was reenacting the primordial forces he saw in action on the rockscape. The island, marked by glaciation, offered him a perspective through which he understood the natural world. The rocks of Georgian Bay and their surfaces became his theme and remained so for his entire life.

== Work ==
In the 1970s, Bartram made prints of the rock faces and their surfaces, often suggesting the lichen that covered them through intaglio, then in 1977, recorded the scene itself in Georgian Bay with rock as a large part of the scene, leaving only a narrow area of sky at the top. The area of sky grew gradually larger, but his story was still the rock face. In 1995, he began to make variable mixed media prints that were one of a kind. Throughout his practice, he created paintings and in 2013, he gave up printing for painting.

== Exhibitions ==
Bartram had many solo and group exhibitions. A 10-year travelling retrospective of his work was organized by the Art Gallery of Brant in Brantford in 1979; a 20-year retrospective was held at the Justina M. Barnicke Gallery, Hart House, Art Museum at the University of Toronto, in 2001; and the McMichael Canadian Art Collection in Kleinburg held a solo exhibition, The Eye Within, in 2009. His work has been represented by the Mira Godard Gallery since 1977 and is also carried by the Galerie d'art Jean-Claude Bergeron in Ottawa, which did shows after Bartram died as did the Godard Callery.

== Awards and selected public collections ==
In 1974, he was awarded the Ontario Arts Council Publication & Purchase Award – "Editions 1", at the Art Gallery of Brant and as a result, his print Island Forms is in the collections of the Art Gallery of Ontario and York University, both in Toronto, and the University of Guelph. His work is also in Museum London in London, Ontario the Art Gallery of Guelph the Art Gallery of Hamilton, the McMichael Canadian Art Collection and many other university and public galleries across Canada as well as many corporate and private collections.

== Memberships and teaching ==
He was elected a member of the Royal Canadian Academy of Arts in 1976 and of the Ontario Society of Artists in 1971. He served as an instructor in printmaking at Central Technical School in Toronto (1971–1986) and as an Intaglio instructor at the Ontario College of Art and Design (1985–2003).

Ed Bartram died on August 25, 2019, in Toronto.
