= Franklin Arbuckle =

Canadian artist (1909–2001)

- Born: George Franklin Arbuckle; February 17, 1909; Toronto, Ontario
- Died: July 29, 2001 (aged 92); Toronto
- Education: Ontario College of Art with J.W. Beatty and J.E.H. MacDonald; summer classes at Franz Johnston's Georgian Bay art school
- Known for: illustrator, painter, educator
- Spouse: Frances-Anne Johnston (m. 1934)
- Awards: Jessie Dow award, Montreal Museum of Fine Arts Spring Shows (1946 and 1947) and four major prizes, Montreal Art Directors' Club

Franklin Arbuckle (nicknamed Archie) RCA (February 17, 1909 – July 29, 2001) was a Canadian illustrator, painter and educator who contributed more than 100 covers and many illustrations to Maclean's magazine in a 60-year career.

== Biography ==
Born in Toronto, he attended the Ontario College of Art, studying with J.W. Beatty, J.E.H. MacDonald, and C.W. Jefferys (1927-1930). As a student, he was one of the illustrators for the Student Annual published at the college (1929?) along with teachers such as Carl Schaefer.

When he graduated he taught at Northern Vocational School in Toronto, took classes and taught in a summer art school run by Franz Johnston, and worked as a commercial artist. During the Second World War, he became an illustrator. He worked for Bomac Engravers in Toronto, an engraving company with offices in Ottawa and Montreal which moved Arbuckle and his family to Montreal (1941-1958). During these years, he exhibited his paintings at the Royal Canadian Academy of Arts from 1932 to 1966, in a solo exhibition at the Art Gallery of Toronto (later the Art Gallery of Ontario) in 1940 and a group exhibition in 1941, and in the Montreal Museum of Fine Arts from 1946 to 1967.

He did his first cover for Maclean's magazine in 1944. Directed by the magazine editors, Arbuckle went cross-country by Canadian Pacific Railway and did paintings for covers and illustrations of different subjects. His total production numbered over 100 covers as well as illustrations for many articles.

The Arbuckle family returned to Toronto in 1958 and Arbuckle taught at the Ontario College of Art till 1989. During this time, he illustrated a number of books on historical themes including "Great Canadians" (1965) and "They Shared to Survive, The Native People of Canada" (1975) as well as illustrating historical themes for major Canadian corporations such as Seagram's (today this collection is in the McCord Museum, Montreal) and the Pulp and Pape Industry of Canada (1951). He also painted murals, including one for Hamilton City Hall (1961) as well as designing tapestries.

In 1996, the McMichael Canadian Art Collection exhibited Souvenir viewpoints: watercolours by Franklin Arbuckle; He died in Toronto in 2001.

== Selected public collections ==
- Art Gallery of Algoma;
- Art Gallery of Ontario, Toronto;
- Canadian Association of New York (CANY);
- Dalhousie Art Gallery;
- Government of Ontario Art Collection, Toronto;
- McCord Museum, Montreal;
- Musée national des beaux-arts du Québec;
- National Gallery of Canada, Ottawa;
- Ottawa Art Gallery;

== Memberships ==
- Ontario Society of Artists (1933-2001);
- Canadian Society of Book Illustrators;
- Royal Canadian Academy of Arts (1945); full member, president of the RCA from 1960 to 1964;

== Awards ==
- Jessie Dow award, Montreal Museum of Fine Arts Spring Shows (1946 and 1947);
- four major prizes, Montreal Art Directors' Club;
- Canadian Centennial Medal;

== Legacy ==
- 2004: The McCord Museum exhibited the ‘’Cities of Canada’’.
- 2022: Ottawa Art Gallery showed a number of Arbuckle's Maclean's covers in a separate gallery in its show A Family Palette Exhibition.

Cultural offices
Preceded by Charles Comfort	President of the Royal Canadian Academy of Arts; 1960–1964	Succeeded by Harold Beament
