= The Golden Pine Cone =

1994 novel by Catherine Anthony Clark

- First edition (publ. Macmillan of Canada)
- Author: Catherine Anthony Clark
- Publisher: Harbour Publishing
- Publication date: January 1, 1994
- ISBN: 9781550170856

The Golden Pine Cone is a novel by Canadian author Catherine Anthony Clark. The main characters are siblings Bren and Lucy, who find a golden pine cone in the woods and go to the spirit world in order to give it to its rightful owner, Tekontha, ruling spirit of British Columbia, where it takes place.

The Golden Pine Cone was Clark's first novel. It was originally published in 1950. An illustrated second edition was published by Harbour Publishing in 1994. In their critical review of Canadian children's books, The New Republic of Childhood, Sheila Egoff and Judith Saltman describe The Golden Pine Cone as "ahead of its time."

== Synopsis ==
Bren and Lucy are playing in the woods when Lucy finds the Golden Pine Cone, dangling from an alder branch. She and Bren walk home, but on their way, they meet a homeless man. They give him something to eat and as a reward for their kindness he gives them his dog, Ooshka. That night, an evil giant named Nasookin comes, seeking the Golden Pine Cone, which is really an earring, belonging to Tekontha (Ooshka, who can talk, tells them this). They hide in the cow tunnel, as Nasookin cannot fit. The next day, Ooshka tells them to give the Golden Pine Cone to the Fish Hawk, who will take it to Tekontha's Valley, but he drops it into the Lake Snake's Mud Swamp, at the far end of the Big Lake. That night, the children go to the Floating Island, which comes out of the water every full moon in the middle of the lake. There lives the beautiful princess, Onamara. She tells them that she is Nasookin's wife, and that her Heart is at the bottom of the lake; the Pearl Folk live there. The children are sucked down into the Wishing Pool on the Floating Island, which brings them to the Pearl Folk. The Pearlies tell them that the Lake Snake still has the pine cone, and, if they slay him, they will give them Onamara's Heart back. Bren and Lucy succeed, and come out of the Big Lake, landing by a slough, where they meet Head Goose. The next day, Head Goose and his friends find a net and use it to carry them and Ooshka to Tekontha'so Valley, but they crash and land in Nasookin's Valley, instead. Nasookin cares for them, and it is revealed he has a crush on Lucy (he nicknamed her "Little Squirrel"), who thinks that he is not as bad as they had originally assumed. Months have now passed, and the forest is now blanketed with snow. Ooshka tells Bren and Lucy about the Cabin where they should run away to. When they get there, they meet the owner, Old Buffer. He cares for them, and gets the Squareheads to give them a ride to Tekontha's Valley, but the sleighs crash at the Ice Witch's castle. They kill her with an axe, and revive a mammoth that was frozen by the Ice Witch. As a reward for saving him, the Mammoth then takes them the rest of the way to Tekontha's Valley, where they return the Golden Pine Cone, and free Ooshka and Nasookin of their crimes. Nasookin takes Bren and Lucy to Onamara, his wife, and they give her her Heart. Bren and Lucy are then safely returned to their parents.
