= Harold Beament =

Canadian artist (1898-1985)

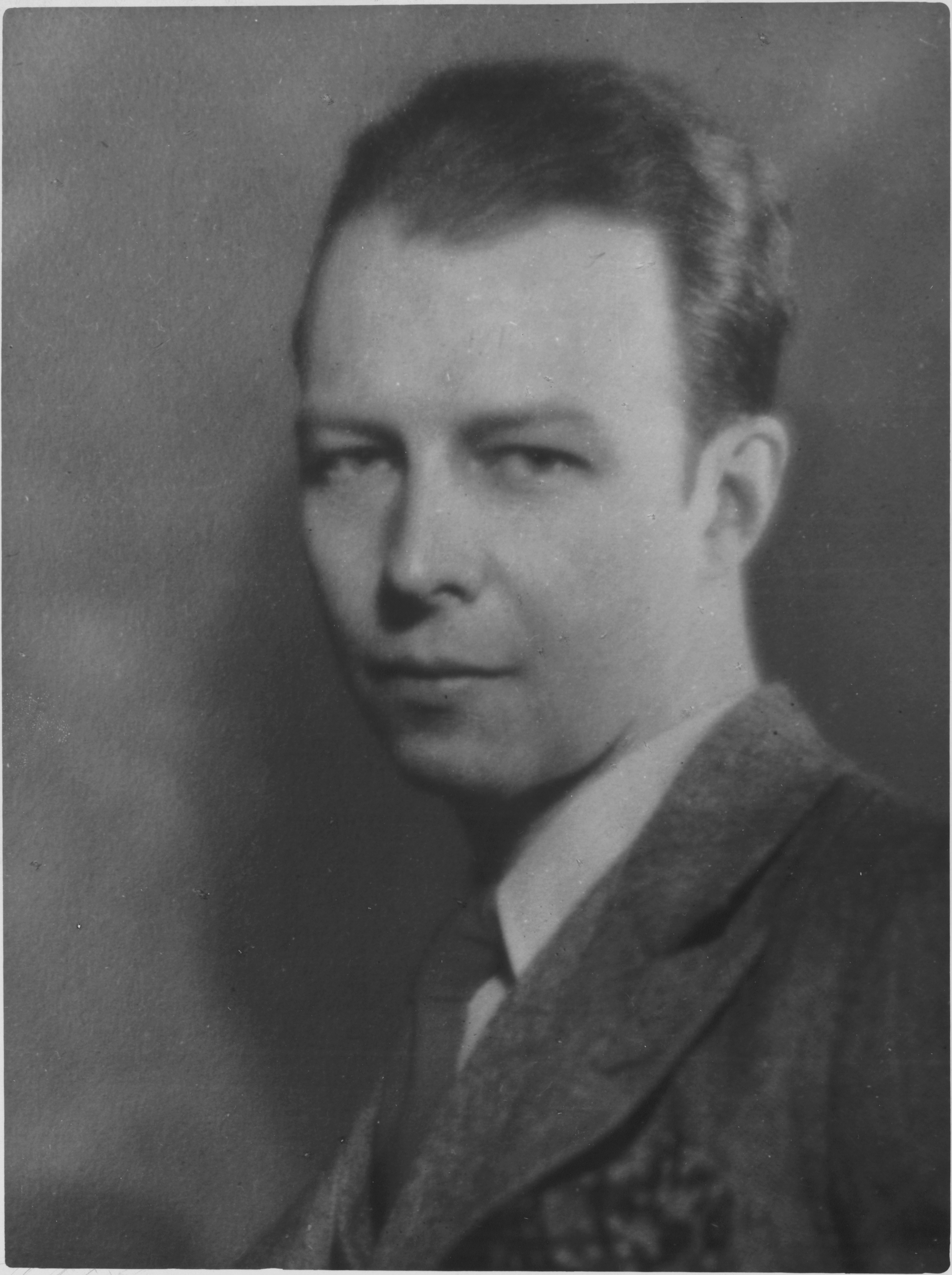
- Born: Thomas Harold Beament; July 23, 1898; Ottawa, Canada
- Died: May 13, 1984 (aged 85); Montreal, Canada
- Education: Evening life classes with J.W. Beatty at the Ontario College of Art, Toronto
- Occupations: Painter, graphic artist
- Awards: Member of the Royal Canadian Academy (ARCA 1936, RCA 1947, Pres. 1964-67)

Harold Beament RCA (also known as Thomas Harold Beament) (July 23, 1898 – May 13, 1984) was an Official Second World War artist with the Royal Canadian Navy and held the highest service rank of any Canadian artist in the Second World War – of Commander. He was noted for the treatment of his depictions in his paintings of landscape and figures in landscape and graphic work, described as "descriptive realism" by some authors.

== Career ==
Beament was born in Ottawa and attended primary and secondary schools there. He enrolled at Osgoode Hall in Toronto in 1916. On account of World War I, Beament interrupted his studies to join the Royal Canadian Navy Volunteer Reserve (RCNVR). He served first as an ordinary seaman, followed by a promotion to warrant officer. After the end of the war Beament returned to Osgoode Hall and graduated as a lawyer in 1922. In the same year he began to attend evening life classes with J.W. Beatty at the Ontario College of Art in Toronto. Beament, continued to serve with the peacetime Naval Reserve and was promoted to the rank of officer in 1924. After he had moved to Montreal in 1926, he was promoted to Lieutenant Commander, Montreal RCNVR Division in 1930.

Beament held his first important solo show at the Watson Art Gallery in Montreal and continued to exhibit with the gallery until 1939. Beament became a good friend of gallery owner William R. Watson, as both men had served in the Navy. He also exhibited regularly in the Montreal Museum of Fine Art Spring Shows and the Royal Canadian Academy of Arts (RCA) Annual Shows. In 1935, Beament won the Jessie Dow Prize at the Montreal Museum of Fine Art Spring Show.

Beament taught art at the Montreal Museum of Fine Art School in 1936 and privately from 1936 to 1957. At the outbreak of WWII, Beament entered full-time service with the RCNVR, as a commander of minesweepers and escort vessels on North Atlantic patrols (1939-1943). He rose in rank to Commander in 1943, then as official Canadian war artist, painted scenes at sea till 1947. The Canadian War Museum has some 76 paintings by Beament. He was awarded the Auxiliary Forces Officer's Decoration in 1943.

Following his retirement from the Naval Reserve in 1947, Beament resumed his full-time career as a professional painter. He held two solo shows at Laing Galleries, Toronto in 1948 and 1949 and painted a wide variety of subjects while travelling extensively. In the Canadian North he painted scenes of the Inuit, made into prints by Sampson Matthews. One Inuit figure by Beament can be seen on a 1955 ten cent stamp that he designed for the Canadian Postal Service (now Canada Post). These lithograph prints of Inuit were used by the Queen Elizabeth Hotel, Montreal.

Beament is represented in the following notable public collections: National Gallery of Canada; Canadian War Museum; McMichael Canadian Art Collection; Art Gallery of Hamilton; Museum London, Ontario; and elsewhere. He was a member of the Royal Canadian Academy (ARCA 1936, RCA 1947, Pres. 1964–1967) and a member of the Canadian Society of Graphic Art (1926-1928), the Arts Club, Montreal, and Pen & Pencil Club, Montreal. He was also an Honorary Member of the Chelsea Arts Club in London, England. Beament died in Montreal, in 1985. He is the father of artist, Tib Beament.

A fonds of his material is at Library and Archives Canada containing drawings made on his arctic trip.,

Cultural offices
Preceded by Franklin Arbuckle	President of the Royal Canadian Academy of Arts; 1964-1967	Succeeded by Clare Bice
