= Muf =

Collaborative of artists, architects and urban designers

muf

Practice information
- Founded: 1994
- Location: London, England

Website
- www.muf.co.uk

muf is a collaborative of artists, architects and urban designers based in London, England, specialising in the design of the urban public realm to facilitate appropriation by users.

Projects include Kings Crescent Estate.

In 2011 muf worked to renovate Altab Ali Park.

== History ==
muf were formed in 1994 when they were loaned office space for 6-months in Great Sutton Street, London. They were committed to working in the public realm, at the same time critiqueing the private realm (where 'care' and 'feeling' had been confined). muf were strong supporters of flexible working practices, which allowed childcare responsibilities and external teaching commitments to continue. In 1995 muf consisted of two architects, Juliet Bidgood and Liza Fior and an artist, Katherine Clarke, in regular collaboration with urban theorist, Katherine Shonfield.

== Notable projects ==
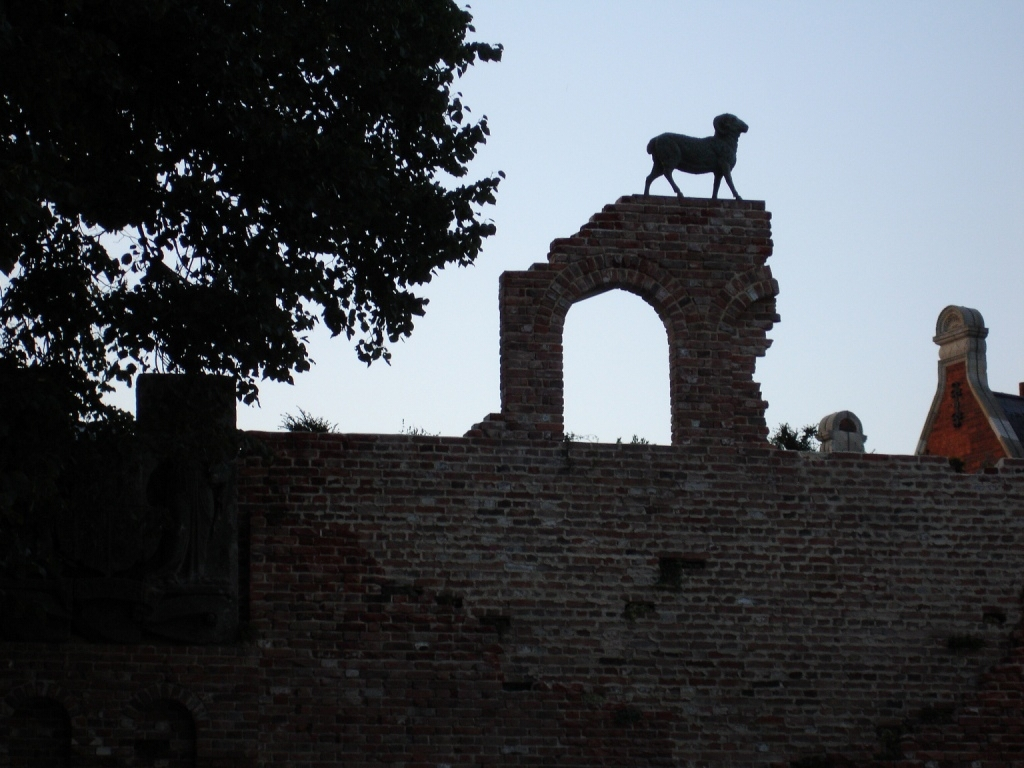
Muf's Folly Wall in Barking Town Square

- 2005 – Broadway Estate Park, Tilbury – new public area including a dressage arena for horses.
- 2008 – Barking Town Square
- 2010 – British Pavilion, Venice Biennale of Architecture – muf were appointed as artistic directors.
- 2011- Mile End Bridge
- 2011- Altab Ali Park, Whitechapel
- 2016- Wonderlab, The Science Museum
- 2018- Kings Crescent Estate Public Realm
- 2019- Golden Lane Estate Play

== Awards ==
2018

RIBA National Award 2018 (Kings Crescent Estate with Karakusevic Carson and Henley Halebrown)

RIBA Regional Award, London (Kings Crescent Estate with Karakusevic Carson and Henley Halebrown)

New London Awards, Mayor's Prize (Kings Crescent Estate with Karakusevic Carson and Henley Halebrown)

2012

Swiss Architecture Prize (nominee)

2011

muf: Public Realm Architect of the Year (BD Architect of the Year Awards)

J&L Gibbons with muf (Making Space in Dalston): Landscape Institute President's Award

Barking Central, Public Realm Architect: RIBA Award

2010

Eastern Curve (Making Space in Dalston): Hackney Design Award

Leysdown Rose Tinted, Rosa Ainley and muf architecture/art: Arts and Health Award

Mies Van der Rohe Prize (nominee)

2008

Barking Town Square: Awarded the European Prize for Urban Public Space for their town square project.

Mies van der Rohe Prize (nominee)

2007

Whitecross Street: The Islington Society Architecture and Conservation Award

2003

Camden Arts Centre: Art for Architecture Award

2000

Hypocaust Building Competition: St Albans City and District Council

muf: Jane Drew Prize shortlist

== Exhibitions ==
São Paulo Biennale, 2019

Singapore Biennale, 2019

Manifestos Royal Academy 2019

Vienna, Critical Care: Architecture for a Broken Planet, 2018

Public Luxury, Ark Des, Stockholm 2018

Robin Hood Gardens, Venice Biennale, Arts Pavilion 2018

Urbanistas – Women Innovators in Architecture, Urban and Landscape Design, Roca London Gallery, London and Northern Architecture Centre, Newcastle 2015

Venice Architecture Biennale 2012, invited exhibitor

Venice Architecture Biennale 2010, British Pavilion Author

== Publications by muf ==
Books

More than one (fragile) thing at a time, http://morethanonefragile.co.uk/, tabletwoproductions, London: forthcoming

This Is What We Do: A muf Manual, London: Ellipsis, 2001

Design Guidance

Whitechapel Public Realm and Open Space Guidance, Sep 1, 2016, WPROSG for the London Borough of Tower Hamlets, https://issuu.com/mufarchitectureartllp/docs/wprosg

Is This What You Mean by Localism? Sep 1, 2015, https://issuu.com/mufarchitectureartllp/docs/is_this_what_you_mean_by_localism

Hackney Wick & Fish Island Design and Planning Guidance, Mar 12, 2014, https://issuu.com/mufarchitectureartllp/docs/hwfiguidance

The Barking Code for the Public Realm and how it should be applied, 2006–2012, 26 Feb. 2013, https://issuu.com/mufarchitectureartllp/docs/report_10_080724lowres

Making Space in Dalston (with J&L Gibbons), Jan. 30, 2013, https://issuu.com/mufarchitectureartllp/docs/making_space_big

Articles

‘Making Time for Conversations of Resistance’ (with Elke Krasny and Jane da Mosto), in Meike Schalk et al. (eds.), Feminist Futures in Spatial Practice, Baunach: AADR Spurbuch Verlag, 2017

‘What happens when the wall comes down?’, MIAW 2017/Milano Farini Rail Yard: Just Like Starting Over, Lettera Ventidue 2017

‘Preparations for the Afterlife: Barking Town Square muf architecture/art’ (with Katherine Clarke), in L. Brown (ed.), Feminist Practices: Interdisciplinary Approaches to Women in Architecture, London: Routledge, 2016

‘Visions for 2017’, Disegno Daily 26 Dec. 2016

‘Into the Fun Palace: The Swiss Pavilion’, The Architectural Review, 25 July 2014

‘Spaces that Inspire Ownership through Occupation’, conversation with Myrna Margulies Breitbart, in M.M. Breitbart (ed.), Creative Economies in Post-Industrial Cities, Ashgate, 2013

R-Urban Wick Zine no. 2, May 2013

‘Alternative Legacies for the Olympic Park site’ (with Katherine Clarke), in F. Waltersdorfer and N. Rappaport (eds.) Architecture Inserted, Yale School of Architecture, W.W. Norton: 2011

‘Afterlife – Barking Town Square’, Hintergrund 49 (2011), pp. 28–32

‘Public Spaces through the prism of time’, Adaptable City/La Ville Adaptable, pp. 13–17, Paris: EUROPAN 2011

‘Mapping in Hackney Wick and Fish Island: Observation is Proposition’, Architectural Design 82:4 July/August 2011, pp. 118–121

‘Pendolino’, in W. Scheppe, Done.Book: Picturing the city of society, British Council/Hatje Cantz, 2010

‘Two-way traffic’, in Villa Frankenstein vol. 1, Manchester: Cornerhouse Publications, 2010

‘Two-way traffic’ (with Katherine Clarke), The Architects’ Journal, 26 Aug. 2010

‘An Invisible Privilege’ (with muf), in Doina Petrescu (ed.), Altering Practices: Feminist Politics and Poetics of Space, London: Routledge, 2007, pp. 57–68

‘It's all about getting what you want - what we want is to make work that fits’ (with Katherine Clarke and Sophie Handler), Architectural Design 75, no. 2 (April 2005)

‘Rights of common: ownership, participation, risk’ (with Sophie Handler, Katherine Clarke and Katherine Shonfield), in P. Blundell Jones, D. Petrescu and J. Till (eds.), Architecture and Participation, London: Routledge 2005, pp. 211–16

‘Shared Ground’, in J. Hill (ed.), Occupying Architecture pp. 119–134, Routledge 1998

== Media Coverage ==
Space the final frontier, for Financial Times, Edwin Heathcote, 2020

‘Ruskin Square’, in Critical Care: Architecture and Urbanism for a Broken Planet ed. Angelika Fitz, Elke Krasny and Architekturzentrum Wien, MIT Press 2019

‘Citizenship, the V&A, and the almost impossible’, Elke Krasny, Museums Etc., Jan. 2019

‘The women designing new London’, Open City, 11.9.2018

Claudia Antunes, 'Para uma Arquitectura de Resistência': Análise do projecto Making Space in Dalston de muf architecture/art e J&L Gibbons’, Colóquio "Arquitectura dos Territórios Metropolitanos Contemporâneos", 3ª edição, 2018

Thomas-Bernard Kenniff, ‘Dialogue, ambivalence, public space’, The Journal of Public Space, 3:1, 2018

‘Will this three-storey slice of British brutalism be the toast of Venice?’ Oliver Wainwright, The Guardian 15 May 2018

‘Muf architecture/art’s Liza Fior: There is a potential loss from densification’, Public Art Agency, Sweden, 6 November 2017

‘Caring Activism. Assembly, Collection, and the Museum’, Elke Krasny, in: http://collecting-in-time.gfzk.de/en, 2017

‘Insurgent Gardens: The Dalston Eastern Curve Garden’, The New English Landscape 14 April 2017, https://thenewenglishlandscape.wordpress.com/tag/liza-fior/

‘Liza Fior’, María José Ferrero Ibargüen, Un Dia Una Arquitecta, 24 November 2016

‘Wonderlab: The Statoil Gallery’, The Observer, 9 Oct. 2016

‘Architecture, Activism and Community: From Matrix to muf (and beyond)’, Parlour 8 Sept. 2015

Saul M. Golden et al., ‘Public Intentions for Private Spaces: Exploring Architects' Tactics to Shape Shared Space in Private-led Development’, International Journal of Architectural Research (Archnet-IJAR), 2015

Violeta Pires Vilas Boas, ‘Artistic Actions for a Happier Venice’, in Urbanistica Informazioni: Urban Happiness and Public Space ed. Marichela Sape, May/June 2015

Serafina Amorosa, ‘Notes for a Decalogue of the Happy City’, in Urbanistica Informazioni: Urban Happiness and Public Space ed. Marichela Sape, May/June 2015

‘Urbanistas: the female architects shaping London’, Evening Standard 12 Mar. 2015

Lucy Bullivant, ‘How are women changing our cities?’, The Guardian 5 March 2015

Sebastian Loew, ‘Rebooting the Masterplan’, Urban Design Summer 2014

‘muf architecture .. the real deal?’, Thinking it, 24 April 2014

F. Tonkiss, ‘Austerity, Urbanism and the Makeshift City’, City 17:3 (2013), 312-24

Jérôme Mallon, Architecture Citoyenne: Vers une Réinterpretation des Roles de l’Architecte, Liège, 2013

Myrna Breitbart, ‘Inciting desire, ignoring boundaries and making space: Colin Ward's considerable contributions to radical pedagogy, planning and social change’, in Education, Childhood and Anarchism: Talking Colin Ward, ed. Catherine Burke and Ken Jones, Routledge, 2013

Jane Rendell, ‘A way with words: feminists writing architectural design research’, in M. Fraser (ed.), Design Research in Architecture, Farnham: Ashgate 2013, pp. 117–36

Interview with Florian Heilmeyer, CrystalTalk, 2011

‘muf is enough’, The Independent, 1 Aug. 2010

‘muf architecture/art’, Spatial Agency, http://www.spatialagency.net/database/how/networking/muf (2010)

‘Gothic revival’, New Statesman, 28 Oct. 2010

‘From Barking to Venice: Siobhan McGuirk meets collaborative art and architecture practice muf’, Red Pepper, Sept. 27, 2010

‘Liza Fior’, The Architects’ Journal, 26 Aug. 2010

‘Villa Frankenstein’, interview with Liza Fior, Domus, 23 Aug. 2010

'The Young generation with a new vision to build Britain’, The Observer, 21 June 2009

Interview with Liza Fior, The Plan 022, Oct. 2007

‘Barking Town Square, Barking [London, UK]’, A + T, no. 27 (2006)

Zoe Ryan, Barking Town Square: muf architecture/art’, in The Good Life: New Public Spaces for Recreation, New Jersey: Princeton Architectural Press, 2006, pp. 43–44

Katherine Vaughan Williams, ‘We need artists’ ways of doing things: a critical analysis of the role of the artist in regeneration practice’, in P. Blundell Jones, D. Petrescu and J. Till (eds.), Architecture and Participation, London: Routledge 2005, pp. 217–226

Cordula Zeidler, ‘Hypocaust Building, St. Albans: muf’, A10: New European Architecture, no. 4 (Aug. 2005)

Alison Hand, ‘Out in the open [public art]’, Blueprint 216, Feb. 2004

‘Open spaces that are not parks: Town regeneration in London - one example’, Archithese 34, no. 5 (Oct. 2004)
