= Otis Tamasauskas =

Canadian artist (born 1947)

- Born: Otis Kazys Tamasauskas; July 11, 1947 (age 78); Tirschenreuth, Federal Republic of Germany
- Education: B.F.A. University of Windsor, Windsor, Ontario (BFA in 1974)
- Spouse: Jan Winton
- Awards: Member, Royal Canadian Academy of Arts

Otis Tamasauskas RCA (born 1947) is a printmaker and educator.

== Career ==
Otis Tamasauskas was born in Tirschenreuth, Germany in a displaced persons camp in 1947, following his parents' escape from Lithuania when the Communists came to power. He emigrated with his family to Canada in 1952 to Niagara Falls and to Toronto in 1954. He was educated at Central Technical School, Toronto (1963–1967) and the University of Windsor, Ontario, receiving his Bachelor of Fine Arts in 1974. Afterwards, he worked at the artist-run centre Open Studio in Toronto as a printmaker, with Don Holman and Richard Sewell, becoming in time the director of etching and co-director of lithography.

As a child, Tamasauskas was interested in Lithuanian folk art and traced Lithuanian symbols in books on Lithuanian folk art and design. "When I made my first print," he has written, "I knew this was it, it was what I wanted to do, in life…. the idea of being able to use a plate, or block; print it many times, side by side, sequential images provided a vicarious explanation of obsessive patterns that reoccur in Lithuanian folk art, and design, relating to my early visual experiences" (1998).

In making a print, as his colleague and friend, J. C. Heywood has said, he begins “by moving quite spontaneously on a litho stone with a vigorous, warm mark, then building his image layer by layer out of that initial impetus”. Heywood says Tamasauskas' way of working is close to the approach of Stanley William Hayter - causing the medium to develop the image out of its inner characteristics. Tamasauskas often integrates found artifacts or collage with his prints to create what he calls an "amalgam". He feels that with a print

"there is an intimacy with paper which allows an artist to communicate a brief passage or a fleeting idea which is too fragile to convey with a big canvas or masonite or any other structural material" (1981).

His prints are known for their innovations. With many of Tamasauskas' prints, only one is created, rather than a numbered edition. He has been called eccentric or at least, of working loosely with the medium in his way of printmaking by one art historian. Another writer has said that his amalgam gives a more complex effect, one related to psychological factors. Tamasauskas has praised the amalgam's printed surface as escaping traditional printmaking.

He has had numerous solo exhibitions and group shows in Canada, in the United States, and abroad. In 1983–1982, a travelling exhibition of his prints was organized by the Art Gallery of Guelph. In 2019, a show of his work titled "Amalgam" was held at Open Sound in Toronto. Tamasauskas' work is in many corporate and private collections, notably the National Gallery of Canada, Art Gallery of Ontario, Vancouver Art Gallery, and the Room’s Art Gallery of Labrador, Newfoundland. He is a member of the Royal Canadian Academy of Arts.

Besides being a Master Printer and Director of Etching at Open Studio in Toronto, Tamasauskas has taught printmaking at McMaster University in Hamilton (1978–1980), Scarborough College, University of Toronto (1978–1983), and Queen's University at Kingston (1980 on) where he worked with J. C. Heywood.

== Personal life ==
From 1981 until 1999, Otis Tamasauskas and sculptor and printer Jane Garland lived in a commercial hotel which they renovated at Priceville, Ontario. Tamasauskas loved fishing in the Saugeen River. In 1994, Otis moved to Gananoque, Ontario.
