= Charles Comfort =

Scotland-born Canadian painter, sculptor, teacher, writer and administrator

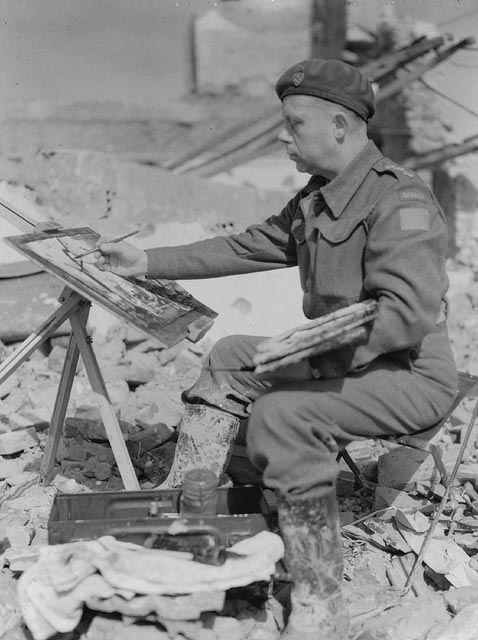
- Comfort painting in the area around Ortona, Italy, on duty as a World War II war artist.
- Born: July 22, 1900; Edinburgh, Scotland, U.K.
- Died: July 5, 1994 (aged 93); Ottawa, Ontario, Canada
- Known for: Painter
- Notable work: Tadoussac, 1935, Captain Vancouver, 1937, BC Pageant 1951
- Awards: Officer of the Order of Canada

Charles Fraser Comfort, OC RCA LL. D. (July 22, 1900 – July 5, 1994) was a Scottish-born Canadian painter, sculptor, teacher, writer and administrator.

== Career and biography ==
=== Early life ===
Born near Edinburgh, Scotland, Comfort moved to Winnipeg in 1912 with his family. His father found work with the treasury department for the city of Winnipeg. Comfort, as the eldest child, had to work from a young age to help support his family. In 1914, he began work as a commercial artist at the newly established Brigdens commercial art branch office in Winnipeg established by Frederick Henry (Fred) Brigden, and by 1916 Comfort started attending evening classes at the Winnipeg School of Art.

Comfort saved money to attend the Art Students League of New York under Robert Henri and Euphrasius Tucker. Still working part-time for Brigdens commercial studio, he was temporarily transferred to Toronto in 1919. While in Toronto, Comfort joined the Arts and Letters Club, taking life-study classes and meeting members of the Group of Seven. Comfort visited the Group's inaugural 1920 exhibition, which inspired Comfort to work on landscape paintings, a theme he continued throughout his lifetime.

Comfort returned to Winnipeg in 1922 for his first exhibition of watercolours at the Winnipeg Art Gallery. During this time, he met Lionel LeMoine FitzGerald and Walter J. Phillips. It was not until 1925 that Comfort painted his first oil painting, when he returned to Toronto where he befriended Will Ogilvie, who may have influenced his switch to oil. In 1928 he painted a striking watercolour portrait of violinist Alexander Chuhaldin with his Amati violin, with a copy of the Natalia Goncharova set design for Le Coq d'Or in the background (painting now in the Art Gallery of Hamilton).

=== Mid-career and work as a war artist ===
Comfort's Tadoussac of 1935.

Comfort was commissioned to design a mural for Toronto's North American Life Building in 1932, the first in many he completed. The following year he met the American Precisionist Charles Sheeler. One of the artist's most celebrated works, Tadoussac of 1935, suggests the influence of Sheeler due to its clear crisp colours and shapes.

In the 1930s, Comfort worked in commercial illustrator as well as a teacher at the Ontario College of Art and Design from 1935 to 1938. In 1936, Comfort rented a studio next to a room occupied by A. Y. Jackson, in the Studio Building, a building made famous by the Group of Seven artists, and the following year he designed the exterior frieze and interior murals for the Toronto Stock Exchange.

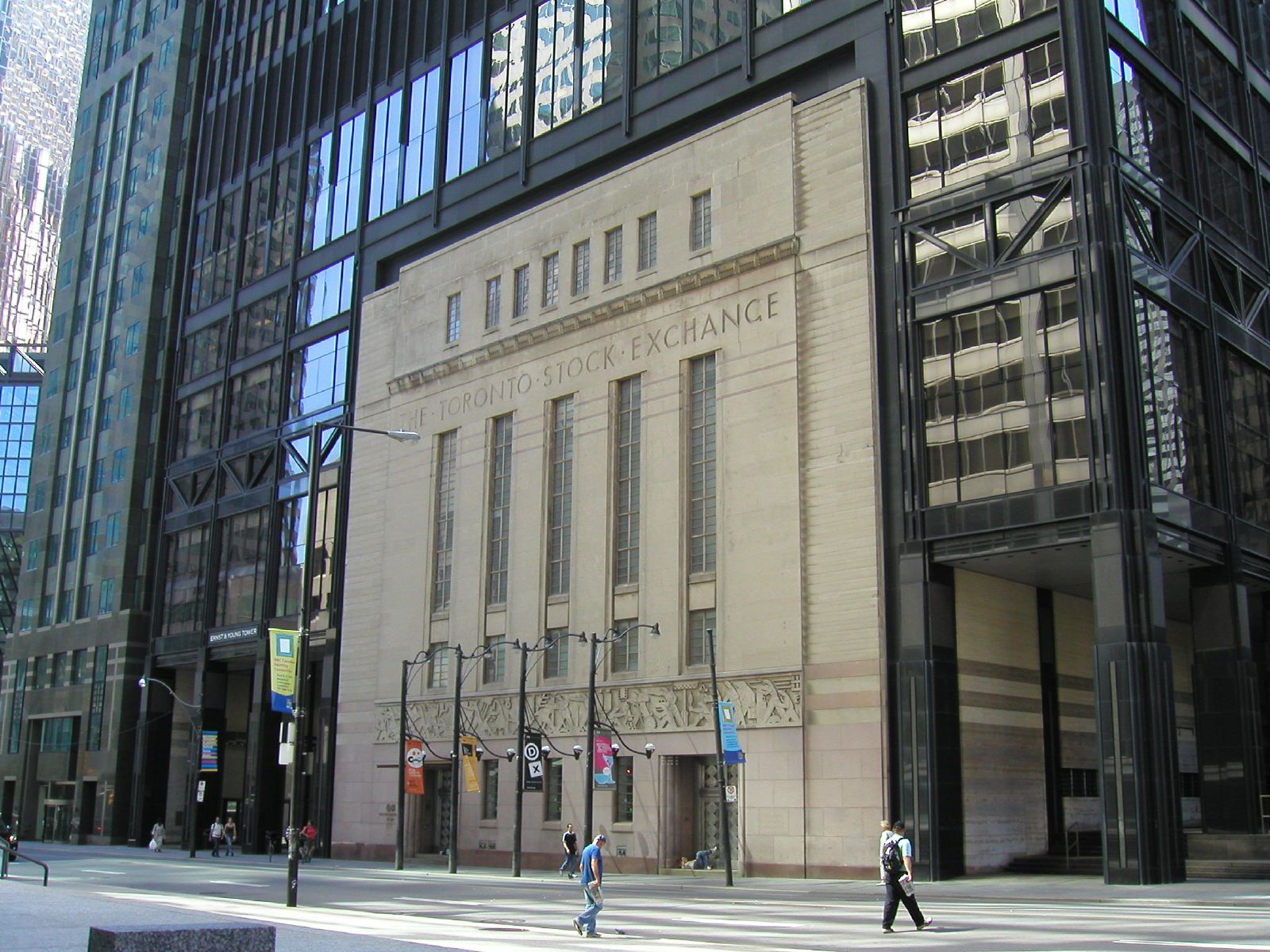
Toronto Stock Exchange facade, with Comfort's frieze

In 1937, he was commissioned by the International Nickel Company to produce a 2x6m centrepiece work entitled "The Romance of Nickel" for the Paris Exhibition; it now hangs in the National Gallery of Canada.

Comfort was one of the organizers of the 1941 Kingston Conference, a meeting of Canadian artists to discuss the role of art in society as well as other issues facing the arts at the time. He also helped to initiate Canada's World War II War Art program, serving as an Official Second World War artist. He joined the Canadian Army (Active) in February 1943. During this time he painted widely in the south of England before joining the 1 Canadian Infantry Division in Italy, travelling by sea in November 1943 with the field historian Samuel Hughes. He served as a war artist from that date until July 1946, holding the rank of major. There he painted principally the Ortona and Liri Valley battles before returning to the United Kingdom in August 1944. He visited North-West Europe for some weeks in 1945. In 1956, he had published Artist at War, a book he wrote about his experiences.

He returned to academic life after the war teaching mural painting at the Ontario College of Art, and later became Professor of Art and Archeology, University of Toronto until 1960. He taught primarily painting techniques, including mural-painting, and other studio courses later in his career at the university.

Comfort was a founding member of the Federation of Canadian Artists and contributed to the 1951 Massey Report, which led to the founding of the Canada Council, an organization that Comfort helped establish. In 1954 he was one of eighteen Canadian artists commissioned by the Canadian Pacific Railway to paint a mural for the interior of one of the new Park cars entering service on the new Canadian transcontinental train. Each of the murals depicted a different national or provincial park; Comfort's was Banff National Park. He also created murals for the Canadian National Railway Montreal Central Station.

=== Director of the National Gallery of Canada 1960-1965 ===
After the war, Comfort served on the Board of Directors and various committees at the Art Gallery of Toronto, and was Director of the National Gallery of Canada from 1959 until 1965. During his time as the Director of the National Gallery of Canada, he helped the National Gallery of Canada move into the Lorne building in 1960. He was also a member of the Canadian Society of Graphic Art, Canadian Society of Painters in Water Colour, and Canadian Group of Painters, and held executive positions in a number of art organizations. He received an honorary doctorate from Mount Allison University in 1958. He was a member of the Royal Canadian Academy of Arts. His extensive involvement during his life with artists' organizations indicates his strong belief in the importance of art integrated with society. In 1972, he was made an Officer of the Order of Canada.

== Commissions ==
Charles Fraser Comfort was commissioned to paint a posthumous 3/4 length portrait of No. 1557 Colonel William Reginald Sawyer, Director of Studies 1948-1967 standing in front of the Mackenzie Building and the Stone Frigate in his academic robes for the Royal Military College of Canada.

== First Nations criticism ==
Comfort's now controversial Captain Vancouver, completed in 1939.

The Canadian National Railway commissioned Captain Vancouver for Hotel Vancouver in 1939. After months of research and planning, Comfort decided to depict a hypothetical encounter between Captain George Vancouver and an unnamed Indian chief at a potlatch ceremony. Comfort researched the clothing of the era and consulted Aboriginal anthropologist Dr. Marius Barbeau and others. The painting was removed in 1969 when the hotel was renovated. The wife of Governor General of Canada Roland Michener discovered the work after it was briefly misplaced and donated it to the University of British Columbia. From this time aboriginal viewers have raised concern over the representation of the First Nations people, as Captain Vancouver physically stands triumphantly over the aboriginal men.

In 1997, Kwakiutl artist David Neel made the Captain Vancouver Portrait Mask, a carved mixed-media mask of the captain. Neel made this work to critique the mural and its depiction of First Nations history and society. Also in 1997, Edmonton-based artist Jane Ash Poitras painted a new mural representing the same scene with the intention to critique and re-negotiate Comfort's depiction of First Nations people.

== Record sale prices ==
At the Heffel Auction "A Legacy Through Art: The Hudson's Bay Company Collection" in 2025 at a special sale caused by the closing of the company, Comfort's painting for a calendar, lot 016, Barnston and Ballantyne at Tadoussac, 1846, oil on board, signed and dated 1941 and on verso titled on the Hudson’s Bay Company Collection label, 32 3/4 x 30 1/2 in, 83.2 x 77.5 cm, estimate: $10,000 - $15,000 CAD, sold for: $571,250.

== See also ==
- Canadian official war artists
- War artist
- War art

== Notes ==
Cultural offices
Preceded by H. L. Allward	President of the Royal Canadian Academy of Arts; 1957–1960	Succeeded by Franklin Arbuckle
