= Carol Podedworny =

Canadian curator, museum director (born 1959)

- Born: Carol Ann Podedworny; 1959; Kingston, Ontario
- Education: BA, Art History, University of Guelph (1977–81); Master of Museum Studies, University of Toronto (1981–84); MA (Art History), York University, Toronto (1988–90)
- Known for: curator, museum director

Carol Podedworny (born 1959) is a Canadian museum director and curator who advocated for the inclusion of contemporary Indigenous art and for Indigenous voices in Canadian museums in a career spanning over 40 years. Besides post-contact First Nations art, she is interested in contemporary Canadian art, and a diverse range of art history and art, including its material practice. She is the author or co-author of many books, catalogues and essays which investigate these subjects, as well as issues of medical inquiry.

== Career ==
Podedworny was born in Kingston, Ontario to Ukrainian and British parents and grew up mostly in Hamilton. She received her BA in Art History at the University of Guelph (1977–81); her Master of Museum Studies at the University of Toronto (1981–84); and her MA in Art History at York University in Toronto (1988–90). The title of her MA thesis, an excerpt of which was published in C Magazine in 1991, was "First Nations Art & the Canadian Mainstream".

From 1981, she worked in different galleries and museums, then became curator at the Thunder Bay Gallery (1984–88) and an independent curator (1988–99). She was appointed director/curator at the University of Waterloo Art Gallery (1999–2006), director/curator at the McMaster Museum of Art, Hamilton (2006–08) and director/chief curator, McMaster Museum of Art (2008-2024).

She has taught and lectured at many universities and since 2006, has served as an adjunct assistant professor in the School of the Arts, McMaster University. In 1987–88, she was president of the Native Art Studies Association of Canada. She has worked for a number of cultural institutions in the Canadian art community since 1982 and from 1991 to 1995 and 2012 to 2016, she was on the board of directors of the Ontario Association of Art Galleries.

== Writing ==
Podedworny organized, co-organized or contributed essays to exhibitions on the art of such First Nations contemporary artists such as Gerald McMaster (1984), Rebecca Belmore (1988), Robert Houle (1993 and 2002), Greg Staats (2012) and Carl Beam (1994), as well as on Julie Voyce (1999), Rae Johnson, Ed Pien (2006) and Jane Buyers (2006) and others. She curated the important exhibition Rethinking History: Abrams, Andrews, Houle, Leydon, Poitras & Ash-Poitras (1992) in which she placed contemporary First Nations artists in the context of the contemporary mainstream; and curated or co-curated Natalka Husar: Burden of Innocence (2008), Shelagh Keeley (2009) and Jeff Thomas: Cold City Frieze: Mapping Iroquoia (2012). She has co-authored with Robert Houle a Mandate Study (1990–93) on the Subject of the Issues Surrounding the Exhibition, Collection and Interpretation of Contemporary Art of First Nations Artists.

She has also curated exhibitions on a broad range of subjects, from exploring the material history of paintings to the development of art collections and issues of health and wellness, as well as serving as managing producer for many diverse exhibitions such as Greek & Roman Coins in the collection of the McMaster Museum of Art (2022). She wrote Woodlands: Contemporary Art of the Anishnabe (1989), and the chapter "Daphne Odjig: Making History", in Odjig: The Art of Daphne Odjig, 1960–2000, which was praised by the Toronto Star and said to:

[illuminate] the artist's participation in the Winnipeg Art Gallery's groundbreaking 1972 show, Treaty Numbers 23, 287, 1171, which foregrounded questions of cultural diversity, multiplicity of gaze, and history as social construct, and did so within the walls and cultural authority of a major gallery. Now commonplace, these issues were then revolutionary in their application to Aboriginal artmakers.

She co-authored Robert Houle: Troubling Abstraction, is the author of "Issues of Access, Representation & Diversity in the Canadian Milieu", in Re-Mediations: Stephen Foster & James Gillespie, the catalogue which accompanied an exhibition held at the Kelowna Art Gallery; McMaster Museum of Art; Art Gallery of Sudbury and The Art Gallery of Southwestern Manitoba (both 2007) and contributed to the Husar Handbook: Natalka Husar (2010). She has written many articles on a wide range of subjects for magazines such as Muse, the magazine of the Canadian Museums Association.

== Awards ==
From 1987 on, Podedworny has been the recipient of many art critics, art writers and curators grants from the Ontario Arts Council and Canada Council.
