= Adrien Hébert =

Canadian artist (1890–1967)

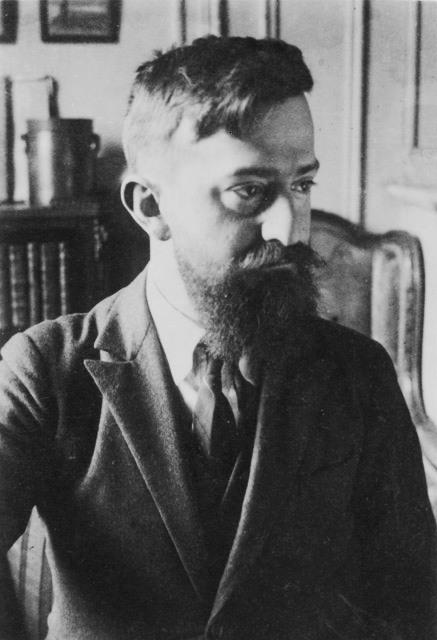
- Born: April 12, 1890; Paris, France
- Died: June 26, 1967 (aged 77)
- Education: Monument National (1904); Art Association of Montreal (1907-1911); studio of Fernand Cormon, Paris (1914)
- Known for: urban painter of Montreal

Adrien Hébert RCA (April 12, 1890 – June 26, 1967) was a painter who has been called the first interpreter of Quebec modernity. He was inspired by the port of Montreal and the city itself.

== Career ==
Adrien Hébert was born in Paris, France where his father, Canadian sculptor Louis-Philippe Hébert was at work casting his work in bronze. His brother Henri Hébert also was a sculptor.

From 1902 to 1911, Adrien Hébert studied art with Edmond Dyonnet, Joseph Franchère, and others at the Monument National. From 1907 to 1911, he also attended the Art Association of Montreal studying with William Brymner. In 1914, he studied in the studio of Fernand Cormon in Paris. He returned to Montreal in 1914 and was appointed a teacher of drawing for the Catholic School Board of Montréal where he served for 35 years.

== Work ==
Hébert's work has a refined and direct approach, especially in his street scenes and his interiors. In 1924 he began to turn his attention to the Port of Montreal as a subject for painting: it was to become a favourite theme. He returned to France on several occasions but he made firm ties in Montreal where in 1950 he moved into a workshop on Labelle Street.

In 1909, he began to show his work at the Spring Salon of the Art Association of Montreal, where it won the Jessie Dow Prize three times (he showed there till 1954). He also showed regularly at the Royal Canadian Academy of Arts (1910-1960). He was a member of the Beaver Hall Group along with his brother and showed there. He showed his work in Paris (1931); at the Watson Art Gallery (1936); and had a solo show at the Arts Club of Montreal (1963). During World War II he painted the locomotives undergoing repair at the C.P.R. Angus Shops. After his death, in 1971, the National Gallery of Canada with the help of T. R. MacDonald organized and toured an exhibition entitled Adrien Hébert, Thirty Years of his Work, and in the summer of 1993, the Musée du Québec commemorated Hebert with an exhibition dedicated to his art. His work also was included in the exhibition 1920s Modernism in Montreal: The Beaver Hall Group (2015).

He was made an associate member of the Royal Canadian Academy of Arts in 1932 and elected an academician in 1941. He was a member of the Arts Club of Montreal for more than forty years.

Hébert died in 1967. His work is included in the National Gallery of Canada, the Montreal Museum of Fine Arts, the Musée national des beaux-arts du Québec the Robert McLaughlin Gallery and others.

== Record sale prices ==
At the Cowley Abbott Auction, Important Canadian Art (Sale 2), December 1, 2022, Lot #108, The Eaton's Window, Montreal (1937), oil on canvas, 32 x 48.25 ins ( 81.3 x 122.6 cms ), Auction Estimate: $70,000.00 - $90,000.00, realized a price of $408,000.00.
