= Catherine Anthony Clark =

British born Canadian children's author

- Born: Catherine Smith; 5 May 1892; London, England
- Died: 24 February 1977; Victoria
- Notable work: The Golden Pine Cone
- Spouse: Leonard Clark

Catherine Anthony Clark (5 May 1892–24 February 1977), was a British-born Canadian children's author.

== Biography ==
Clark was born Catherine Anthony Smith in London in 1892 as one of eight children. She moved with her family to Grey Creek, British Columbia in 1914. Clark married a local rancher. Clark began to write for The Prospector, a small newspaper in Nelson. Her first novel was published when Clark was 58. Her novels were usually set in Western Canada and used local myths and legends. The illustrator on most of her books was artist Clare Bice. Her novel The Sun Horse won the Canadian Association of Children's Librarians bronze medal in 1952. Clark died in Victoria in 1977.

== Bibliography ==
- The Golden Pine Cone (1950)
- The Sun Horse (1951)
- The One-Winged Dragon (1955)
- The Silver Man (1958)
- The Diamond Feather; or The Door in the Mountain: A Magic Tale for Children (1963)
- The Man with the Yellow Eyes (1963)
- The Hunter and the Medicine Man (1966)
