= Greg Staats =

Canadian artist (born 1963)

- Born: 1963; Ohsweken, Six Nations of the Grand River Territory, Ontario
- Education: Applied Photography, Sheridan College, ON
- Known for: photographer, video, and installation artist
- Awards: Governor General's Awards in Visual and Media Arts (2024)

Greg Staats (born 1963) is a photographer, video, and installation artist, known for examining his Mohawk roots in his work. The landscape images in his photography have symbolism such as his images of the white pine, which was used as a symbol of the unity of the Hodinöhsö:ni' Confederacy. Through his work, he hopes to document a return towards a complete Onkwehón:we neha [our original ways] worldview. In 2024, he was awarded the Governor General's Awards in Visual and Media Arts.

== Career ==
Staats was born on the Ohsweken, Six Nations of the Grand River Territory and studied Applied Photography at Sheridan College, Ontario. His art work involves oral transmission, text works, embodied wampum, photography, sculpture, installation and video. Statts said about his images,

The images here are of deep personal connections to family, land, and systemic deficits that continue to exist... .

He sees himself as a "knowledge keeper" who has discovered knowledge of his Mohawk people's heritage and preserves it, conveying it through his art.

Staats has served as faculty for two Aboriginal Visual Arts Residencies at the Banff Centre (2009 and 2010) and as an artist-in-residence at the Art Gallery of Ontario in 2014-2015. He is a founding member of the Native Indian/Inuit Photographers' Association (NIIPA).

== Selected exhibitions ==
Solo exhibitions include shows at Gallery TPW; Ottawa, Ont., 2002; the Kelowna Art Gallery, 2008; the Museum of Art: McMaster University, 2012; Gallery 44, Toronto, 2019; the Varley Art Gallery of Markham, 2019; which received an Ontario Association of Art Galleries Award, and the Art Gallery of Ontario, ON, 2021. Two person or Group exhibitions include shows at Gallery 44, Toronto, 1992; the Canadian Museum of Contemporary Photography/Musée canadien de la photographie contemporaine, 2000; *Sakahàn: International Indigenous Art, a global survey of contemporary Indigenous art, organized by the National Gallery of Canada (NGC) (2013); and others such as "Soundings: An Exhibition in Five Parts", organized by the Independent Curators International (ICI), 2020;

== Selected public collections ==
- National Gallery of Canada;

== Awards and honours ==
Staats was awarded the 1999 Duke & Duchess of York Prize in Photography from the Canada Council for the Arts; the 2021 Toronto Arts Foundation’s Inaugural Indigenous Artist Award; and was shortlisted for the 2021 Robert Gardner Fellowship in Photography from the Peabody Museum of Archaeology and Ethnography at Harvard University. In 2024 he was awarded the Governor General's Awards in Visual and Media Arts.
