= J. C. Heywood =

Canadian artist (1941–2022)

- Born: John Carl Heywood; June 6, 1941; Toronto, Ontario, Canada
- Died: December 1, 2022 (aged 81); Montreal, Quebec, Canada
- Education: Ontario College of Art with Fred Hagan (1959–1963); Atelier 17, Paris with Stanley William Hayter (1967–1969)
- Known for: Printmaking

John Carl Heywood (June 6, 1941 – December 1, 2022) was a Canadian master printmaker, painter, fibre artist and teacher of printmaking whose work has been shown across North America and Europe.

== Life and career ==
J. C. Heywood was born on June 6, 1941. He grew up in Chesley, Hanover and Galt, Ontario (now Cambridge). He studied at the Ontario College of Art, graduating in 1963. There he learned woodblock printing with Fred Hagan; and at the end of his fourth year, screen printing which he immediately recognized as the right medium for him. He initially taught art at high schools in Ontario, but went on to study etching with Stanley William Hayter at Atelier 17 in Paris from 1967 to 1969. There, he learned a technically and aesthetically different way of working In 1974, he began teaching printmaking at Queen's University at Kingston, working there with Otis Tamasauskas beginning in 1980. Among his many students was Julie Voyce. He retired in 2006 to become a Queen's University Professor Emeritus as he continued to explore and gain new skills through new technology. He died in Montreal on December 1, 2022, at the age of 81.

== Work ==
Heywood reinvented the way a print looks. He used the techniques of screenprint, etching, lithography, vectographs and digital prints and sometimes combined them. He enjoyed spending time proofing, trying out, and comparing all the implications of images, fixing to imbue the sum of this experience into the final print. He often referred to those he felt were the art historical predecessors in his practice, the Cubists, Henri Matisse, and Kurt Schwitters.

Heywood believed printmaking allows total freedom and control of colour. Colour was selected thoughtfully and experimentally. The nature of printing inks is adaptable and gives options: they can have the "delicate transparency of watercolour, the solid opacity of gouache, the buttery richness of oil paint, the intensity of sign paint, the purity of coloured light filters", he said in 1984.

Heywood had worked in a wide variety of print studios in Japan, Germany, France and India, and Canada. He had extensive experience including many exhibitions, lecturing, as a juror and as an assessor for universities. In 1995, he began a quilt-making project using his prints as a basis for quilts. A major retrospective of his work titled J. C. Heywood: A Life in Layers was organized by Geraldine Davis with help from Linda Belshaw Beatty for the Burnaby Art Gallery in 2008. His work is in many public collections such as the National Gallery of Canada in Ottawa, the Victoria and Albert Museum in London, the Musée d'Art Moderne de Paris and the University of Alberta Museums Art Collection which has close to 200 of his works. A full list of the many collections that Heywood's works are in was given in the catalogue for his retrospective in 2008.

After moving to Montreal in 2006, J. C. Heywood pursued painting, applying to it his 40 years of printmaking methodology.

=== Legacy ===
Starting in 2021, Heywood began working with the staff of mardenart gallery in the Pointe-Claire Village, Pointe Claire, Quebec to properly catalogue his life's work. "He spent many hours with staff at the gallery and at his studio. Undaunted by the scope of the project he was always eager to recount stories about the people he had met, his adventurous experiences as an artist and his extensive travels". Many of his travels influenced his work such as the Japan with Flowers, Tunisia & Vegetables, Coffee in Taipei, and India Laundry to name a few.
