= Art Windsor–Essex =

Art museum in Windsor, Ontario, Canada

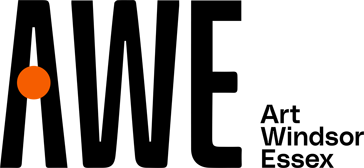

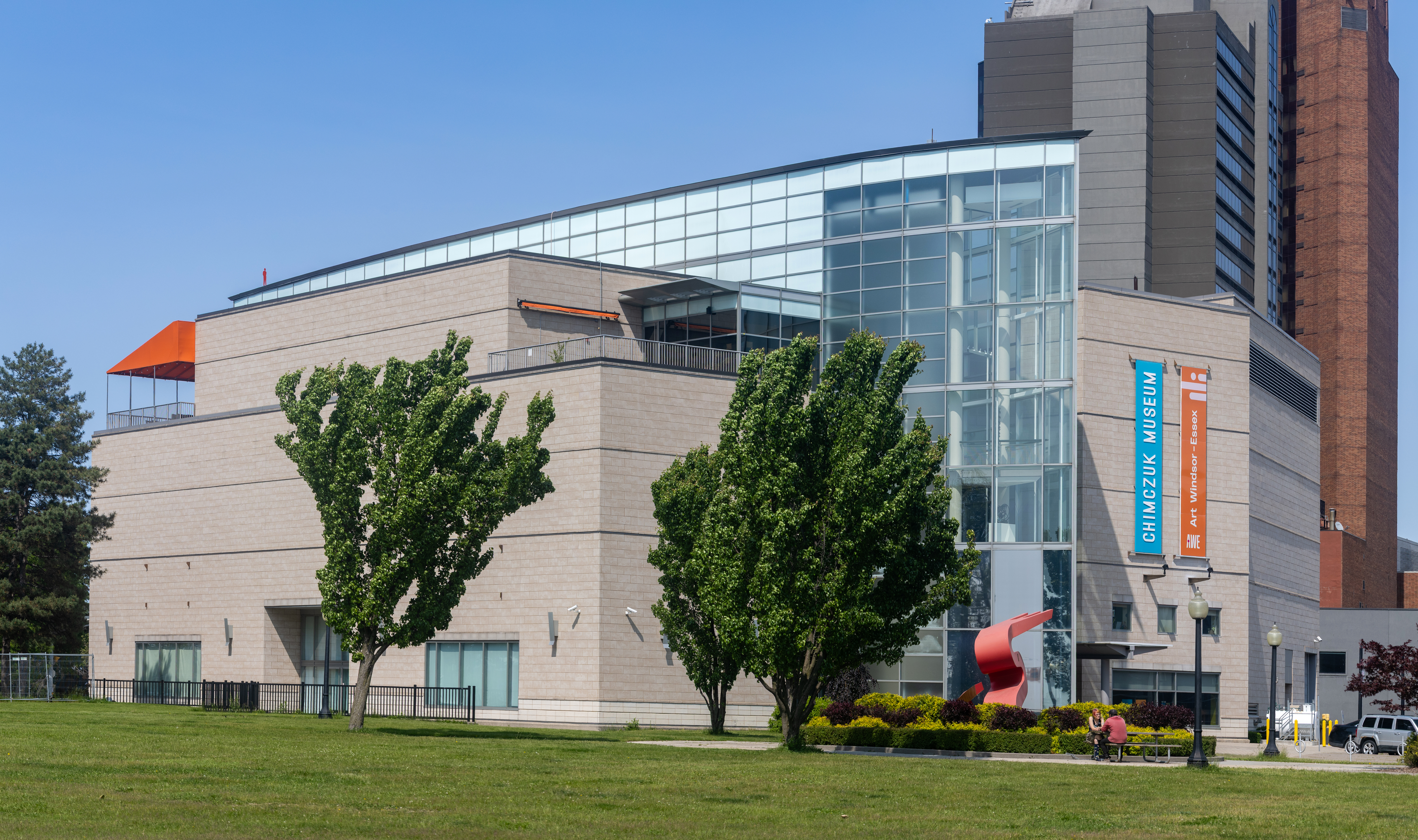
- Established: 1943
- Location: 401 Riverside Drive West; Windsor, Ontario; N9A 7J1
- Coordinates: 42°19′06″N 83°02′40″W
- Executive director: Jennifer Matotek
- Curator: Chris Finn (Curator of Education)
- Website: artwindsoressex.ca

Art Windsor–Essex (AWE), formerly known as the Art Gallery of Windsor (AGW), is a not-for-profit art institute in Windsor, Ontario, Canada.

Established in 1943, the gallery has a mandate as a public art space to show significant works of art by local, regional, and national artists. Art Windsor-Essex has created, collected, presented, and conserved collections of Canadian and Indigenous art, and is one of Windsor's most notable cultural reserves.

== History ==
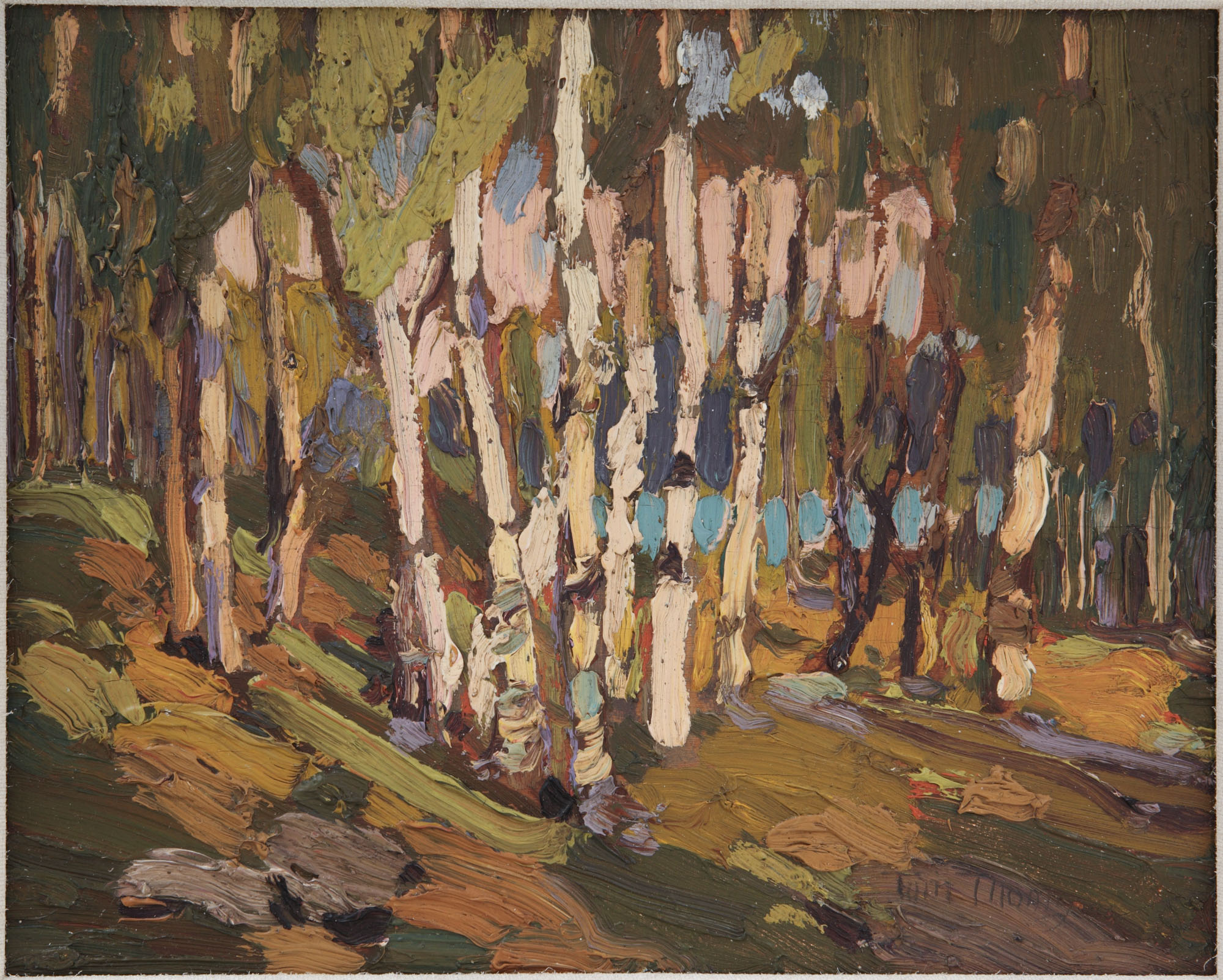
Tom Thomson, White Birches, Fall 1914. The Gallery collection includes three Thomson sketches along with other Canadian artists.

The Art Gallery of Windsor was originally located in Walkerville's Willistead Manor. The distinctive Tudor-Jacobean style building, built by architect Albert Kahn, housed the gallery from 1943 to 1975. It was during this period that the Art Gallery of Windsor was incorporated (1944) and developed the foundation of its collection of Canadian art.

Under the direction of Kenneth Saltmarche the gallery acquired its first collection. In 1947, the Art Gallery of Windsor, or as it was known at the time, The Willistead Gallery, also became one of the founding members of The Southern Ontario Gallery Group, later known as the Ontario Association of Art Galleries.

By 1958, attendance at Willistead Gallery overwhelmed the small space. Along with conflict between the Art Association, which controlled the gallery, and the library board from which it grew, the Windsor art movement was in danger of collapse. After approaching Windsor City Council to negotiate the situation, the Willistead Art Gallery became an independent institution with its own board of directors.

However, by 1967, the gallery was in crisis again, and the search for a new home for the gallery began. In 1970, it was suggested that the gallery take up residence in the abandoned Carling Brewery warehouse on the waterfront, an appropriately modern setting for a gallery in a manufacturing hub. The Art Gallery of Windsor, as it was now known, opened its doors in 1975 and there developed over the span of 20 years one of Ontario's most significant collections of Canadian art.

In 1993, the Art Gallery of Windsor experienced another major shift in both location and outlook. The gallery moved to the Devonshire Mall, leasing its industrial waterfront building to the province of Ontario to house the new Casino Windsor in order to both raise the funds needed to expand the gallery and its collections.

For six years, the Art Gallery of Windsor remained in a limbo of sorts, unable to decide whether to remain in its inadequate Devonshire location, move to another location within the city and renovate, reclaim the warehouse location, or to build a new home for the gallery. Finally, in 1999, Dr. Lois Smedick, president of the AGW board of directors, unveiled plans for a new art museum on the old warehouse location. Shortly thereafter, the old Carling warehouse was torn down and a new modernist building was erected in its place, which houses the Art Gallery of Windsor today. In 2011 due to financial issues, the Art Gallery of Windsor's future was up in the air. The City of Windsor purchased the building and took on the building costs, with the AGW remaining as tenants. In 2014 the City of Windsor installed a new museum, the Chimczuk Museum, on the first floor of the building, while the art gallery occupies the two upper floors. The museum is named after Joseph Chimczuk.

In April 2022, as part of a new strategic plan, the institute was renamed Art Windsor–Essex; the rename is part of a plan to increase its outreach via digital platforms and outside activities. It will also increase its focus on "hands-on" activities, including opening its education centre to the public, and plans to add activities in Essex County.

== See also ==
- List of art museums
- List of museums in Ontario
