= Catherine Freitag Clarke =

American biochemist

Catherine F. Clarke
- Education: University of California, Los Angeles
- Scientific career
- Workplaces: University of California, Los Angeles
- Thesis: Regulation of 3-hydroxy-3-methylglutaryl coenzyme A reductase in rat liver (1985)
- Website: Clarke Lab

Catherine Clarke is an American biochemist who is a Professor of Chemistry at the University of California, Los Angeles. She was the first woman to serve as Head of the Department of Chemistry and Biochemistry. Her research considers the functional roles of Coenzyme Q.

== Early life and education ==
Clarke was an undergraduate and graduate student at the University of California, Los Angeles. Her doctoral research considered the regulation of cholesterol metabolism. After completing her doctoral research, she joined Princeton University as a post-doctoral fellow. She eventually returned to UCLA, where she studied polyisoprene and non-sterol metabolism. Whilst at UCLA, she started working on the biosynthesis of coenzyme Q using the yeast model.

== Research and career ==
Clarke joined the chemistry and biochemistry department at University of California, Los Angeles in 1993. She was eventually promoted to Professor. Her research considers how cells synthesize coenzyme Q, a non-protein chemical compound that is also known as ubiquinone. Coenzyme Q is a naturally occurring enzyme cofactor found in the mitochondria of the body cells.

Clarke makes use of the yeast Saccharomyces cerevisiae and nematode Caenorhabditis elegans to understand the fundamental mechanisms that underpin the inter- and intracellular charge transport of Coenzyme Q. Clarke studies a respiratory defective Saccharomyces cerevisiae mutant that is deficient in coenzyme Q. By characterizing the yeast and polypeptide proteins that are required for the synthesis of coenzyme Q, Clarke has shown that it is possible to investigate these defects. She has shown that yeast and other eukaryotes share the same biosynthetic pathway, and that a large multi-subunit complex within the mitochondrial matrix is required for Q biosynthesis.

Clarke is also interested in the ageing process. It has been shown that gene mutations which increase the lifespan of nematodes such as Caenorhabditis elegans have homologs in vertebrates, act through highly conserved mechanisms. Mutations in the CLK1 gene of C. elegans can give rise to longer lifespans and are defective in the biosynthesis of Coenzyme Q. These results indicate that CLK1 is essential for the biosynthesis of Coenzyme Q. Her research involves understanding how diet, environment and genotype impact longevity.

In June 2016, Clarke became the first woman to lead the UCLA Department of Chemistry and Biochemistry. Clarke was appointed Dean of Special Projects in the UCLA Division of Physical Sciences in 2019.

== Selected publications ==
- Brett Lomenick; Rui Hao; Nao Jonai; et al. (7 December 2009). "Target identification using drug affinity responsive target stability (DARTS)". Proceedings of the National Academy of Sciences of the United States of America. 106 (51): 21984–21989. Bibcode:2009PNAS..10621984L. doi:10.1073/pnas.0910040106. ISSN 0027-8424. PMC 2789755. PMID 19995983. Wikidata Q42959458.
- Randall M Chin; Xudong Fu; Melody Y Pai; et al. (14 May 2014). "The metabolite α-ketoglutarate extends lifespan by inhibiting ATP synthase and TOR". Nature. 510 (7505): 397–401. doi:10.1038/nature13264. ISSN 1476-4687. PMC 4263271. PMID 24828042. Wikidata Q34419977.
- Saskia F Heeringa; Gil Chernin; Moumita Chaki; et al. (11 April 2011). "COQ6 mutations in human patients produce nephrotic syndrome with sensorineural deafness". Journal of Clinical Investigation. 121 (5): 2013–2024. doi:10.1172/jci45693. ISSN 0021-9738. PMC 3083770. PMID 21540551. Wikidata Q24606103.
