= Andrew Shonfield =

British economist (1917–1981)

- Born: 10 August 1917; Tadworth, Surrey, England
- Died: 23 January 1981 (aged 63); London, England
- Occupations: Economist, writer
- Spouse: Zuzanna Shonfield
- Children: Katherine Shonfield
- Writing career
- Subject: Economics
- Notable work: Modern Capitalism

Sir Andrew Akiba Shonfield (10 August 1917 – 23 January 1981) was a British economist best known for writing Modern Capitalism (1966), a book that documented the rise of long-term planning in postwar Europe. Shonfield's argument that planning allows public authority to control and direct private enterprise without taking ownership of it as the socialists proposed have made him one of the better-known advocates of a mixed economy.

Shonfield also worked as a journalist. He was the foreign editor of The Financial Times from 1950 until 1958, then worked as The Observer's economic editor.

He was close to the Labour Party and served first as Director of Studies (1961–68) and then as Director (1972–77) of the Royal Institute of International Affairs, usually known as Chatham House. He was a member of the Royal Commission on Trade Unions and Employers' Associations (the Donovan Commission) which reported in 1968. He headed the Social Science Research Council (now ESRC) between 1969 and 1971. In 1972, he lectured on the consequences of Britain's entry in the European Community in the BBC's Reith Lectures. During the final three years of his life he was Professor of Economics at the European University Institute in Florence. In 1970 he was elected a fellow of Imperial College London. He was knighted in the 1978 New Year Honours.

== Publications ==
- British Economic Policy since the War (1958)
- The Attack on World Poverty (1960)
- A Man Beside Himself (novel) (1964)
- Modern Capitalism: The Changing Balance of Public and Private Power (1966)
- Europe: Journey to an Unknown Destination (1972)
- The Use of Public Power (1983 posthumous)
- In Defence of the Mixed Economy (1984 posthumous, with Zuzanna Shonfield)
