= Zuzanna Shonfield =

British writer and historian

- Born: Zuzanna Przeworska; January 31, 1919; Warsaw
- Died: February 1, 2000 (aged 81); Greater London
- Occupations: Writer, historian
- Spouse: Andrew Shonfield
- Children: Katherine Shonfield
- Writing career
- Notable work: The Precariously Privileged

Zuzanna Shonfield, born Zuzanna Maria Przeworska, (31 January 1919, Warsaw – 1 February 2000, Greater London) was a Polish-born British writer and historian. She is best known as the author of the book The Precariously Privileged (1987) as well as the editor of the works of her husband, Andrew Shonfield: The Use of Public Power (1982) and In Defence of the Mixed Economy (1984).

== Life ==
Zuzanna Przeworska was born in Warsaw on 31 January 1919 in a Jewish-Catholic family. She was educated by governesses until the age of 12, and then studied in a progressive school. At the age of 16, she went to Roedean girl’s public school in Sussex. In 1938, she entered Somerville College in Oxford where she studied French and German. Soon she got interest in politics, philosophy and economics and joined the Communist party.

In 1942, Przeworska married the economist Sir Andrew Shonfield, whom she assisted in writing his books. The couple had two children, a son and a daughter. After her husband’s death in 1981, Shonfield edited and published his uncompleted works The Use of Public Power (1982) and In Defence of the Mixed Economy (1984). It is known that she completed the last section of the book and a table on similarities and differences of the two major oil crises.

In 1987, Shonfield published her book The Precariously Privileged where she reconstructs the life of the Marshall family and charts the trials and fortunes, both comic and poignant, which befell these precariously privileged newcomers to London society.

Zuzanna Shonfield died on 1 February 2000 in Greater London.
