= Liza Fior =

British architect (b. 1962)

Liza Fior (born 1962) is a British architect and designer. She is one of the founding partners of muf architecture/art, a London-based practice of architects, artists and urban designers.

== Career ==
=== muf architecture/art ===
MUF is a collaborative group of architects, artists and designers who specialise in the design of urban public spaces. The practice works with the public realm of architecture, addressing the spatial, social and economic infrastructures of the built environment.

Fior was involved with the muf project of a new town square for Barking, East London, for which they were awarded the 2008 European Prize for Public Space, a first for the UK.

=== Academic ===
Fior teaches at Central Saint Martins, a constituent college of the University of the Arts London. In spring 2009, she taught as a Louis I. Kahn Visiting Assistant Professor of Architectural Design at Yale University's School of Architecture, leading an advanced design studio and seminar.

Fior was part of the international jury of the inaugural ArkDes Call for Fellows in 2018. She participated in the Art is Happening Jordbro 2016-2018 focusing on public art in the late modernist dwelling area of Jordbro, Haninge, Sweden.
