= Julie Voyce =

Canadian artist (born 1957)

- Born: 1957 (age 68–69); Woodstock, Ontario
- Education: Fine Art, Ontario College of Art (graduated 1980)
- Awards: Ernst & Young Great Canadian Printmaking Competition (2003); Artist of the Year Award, First Annual Steam Whistle Art Awards, Toronto (2004)

Julie Voyce (born 1957) is a Canadian multimedia artist, known for her imaginative imagery, and for printmaking.

== Career ==
Voyce studied at the Ontario College of Art and Design, Toronto, graduating in 1980. She has shown her work since 1979 in unusual and diverse places for an artist, such as, she says, "an exhibition truck, shop windows, Union Station, a Trash Palace, a vending machine, galleries and a tree in Grange Park". To gain the technical knowledge she needed about printmaking, she became a regular of Open Studio in Toronto in the 1980s. She also studied printmaking with J. C. Heywood.

Her first exhibition in a formal gallery setting was with a show of prints at Mercer Union in Toronto in 1990. In 1996, she showed in an exhibition curated by Stuart Reid and titled Julie Voyce: The Solo Show with a Boutique at the Art Gallery of Mississauga, in which she dealt with the process of aging. She revisited the subject of aging in a group show in which she participated at the Art Gallery of Hamilton in 1999. From 1999 till 2002, she showed with Paul Petro Contemporary Art in Toronto, then in 2005, with the Southern Alberta Art Gallery in Lethbridge, Alberta, and in 2006, in a group show with Apexart in New York.

She has also participated in group shows in Montreal; Buffalo, New York; Berlin, Paris, and other places abroad, such as a 2009 show titled Feminine & Formal at Galerie de la Friche Belle de Mai in Marseille in which she showed a series of abstract screen prints (they used a limited range of colours, an idea which she had been expanding on since 2000). Her inspiration was, she said, Dr. Seuss and over time, she developed her signature style of layers of shapes and dots.

In 2012, she did an intervention in an existing phone booth as part of Tel-Talk, a series of public art installations culminating in an exhibition at Telephone Booth Gallery, and enhanced it with handmade flowers (the flowers were stolen during the show and replaced with two pennies). Since then, her work has been exhibited at Paul Petro Contemporary Art's Christmas shows (2016, 2017 2018). At the Toronto Art Fair 2020, three linocuts from 2010 by Voyce were acquired by the Art Gallery of Ontario, which already had a collection of 10 artist multiples by her in the Edward P. Taylor Research Library.

Voyce has won several awards such as the Ernst & Young Great Canadian Printmaking Competition (2003) and the Artist of the Year Award, First Annual Steam Whistle Art Awards, Toronto (2004).

Her work is in museum collections such as the Art Gallery of Ontario, Toronto, the Montreal Museum of Fine Arts, and the Art Gallery of Mississauga. She is represented by General Hardware Contemporary in Toronto.
