= Katherine Clarke (historian) =

British ancient historian and academic

Katherine Clarke FBA
- Born: 13 October 1970 (age 56); Leeds, West Yorkshire, England

Academic background
- Education: Leeds Girls' High School
- Alma mater: St John's College, Oxford; Christ Church, Oxford

Academic work
- Discipline: Ancient history
- Sub-discipline: Hellenistic period; Roman Republic; Roman Empire
- Institutions: Christ Church, Oxford; St Hilda's College, Oxford; Faculty of Classics, University of Oxford

Katherine Jane Clarke FBA (born 13 October 1970) is a British ancient historian and academic, specialising in Greek historiography and geography. She is Professor in Ancient History in the Faculty of Classics, University of Oxford, and a Fellow of St Hilda's College, Oxford.

== Early life and education ==
Clarke was born on 13 October 1970 in Leeds, West Yorkshire, England. She was educated at Leeds Girls' High School, an all-girls independent school. She studied literae humaniores at St John's College, Oxford, graduating with a double first Bachelor of Arts (BA) degree in 1993. She then undertook a Doctor of Philosophy (DPhil) degree in ancient history at St John's College, Oxford and Christ Church, Oxford, which she completed in 1996. Her doctoral thesis was titled "Between geography and history: Strabo's Roman world".

== Academic career ==
Clarke was a junior research fellow at Christ Church, Oxford from 1997 to 1998. In 1998, she was elected a fellow of St Hilda's College, Oxford, and appointed a tutor in ancient history. She was also a lecturer in ancient history within the Faculty of Classics, University of Oxford, from 1998. She served as vice-principal of St Hilda's College from 2013 to 2016. She was Chair of the Sub-faculty of Ancient History and Classical Archaeology within the Faculty of Classics from 2015 to 2017. In 2021, she was appointed Professor of Greek and Roman History.

Clarke teaches the history of the late Roman Republic period and early Roman Empire. Her research covers the Hellenistic period and the Greeks interaction with Romans, and historians such as Strabo, Tacitus, and Polybius.

Clarke's first book, Between Geography and history (1999) discussed how the presentation of geography in Polybius, Posidonius, and Strabo responded to the rise of Roman power. In the book, she argues that geography and geographic ideas were more important and complex in ancient historiography than hitherto realised. W. J. Tatum and R. Alston characterised it as "essential reading" for work on Posidonius, Strabo, and Hellenistic geography.

Clarke's second book, Making Time for the Past (2008) explores how ancient Greek city-states conceived of time and the past, as a central part of their communal identities. The book was a groundbreaking work for the study of local history in ancient Greece.

A third book, Shaping the Geography of Empire (2018) deals with the representation of geography and the physical world in Herodotus' Histories.

Clarke was elected a Fellow of the British Academy in 2023.

== Selected publications ==
- Between Geography and History: Hellenistic Constructions of the Roman World (Oxford University Press, 1999; paperback edition 2001)
- Making Time for the Past: Local History and the Polis (Oxford University Press, 2008; paperback edition 2011)
- Shaping the Geography of Empire: Man and Nature in Herodotus' Histories (Oxford University Press, 2018)
