= Katherine Shonfield =

British architect and writer

Katherine Penelope Shonfield, later Katherine Vaughan Williams (22 August 1954 – 2 September 2003), was a British architect and writer, being a regular contributor to both Building Design and the Architects' Journal. She was a founding member of muf architecture/art from 1994.

== Early life ==
Shonfield was born in London in 1954, was brought up in Chelsea and attended St Paul's Girls' School. She was the youngest of the two children of Sir Andrew Shonfield, a socialist economist of some note, and Zuzanna, née Przeworska, a Polish–born historian and writer. Shonfield studied sociology at Kingston Polytechnic and after she graduated took a job in the planning department of Kensington & Chelsea Borough Council. Her upbringing was an important influence on her later work as an architect, with her strongly felt ideals being "largely the product of a highly cultivated, politically liberal and internationally orientated family".

== Architecture career ==
In 1979 she decided to study for an architecture degree at the Polytechnic of Central London, subsequently studying for a diploma there between 1984 and 1985. In between studying for her degree and her diploma she trained under Dalibor Vesely and Peter Carl at Cambridge. After qualifying in 1985, Shonfield began teaching at South Bank Polytechnic and also taught at Kingston Polytechnic, the Polytechnic of Central London and at the Architectural Association. She remained at South Bank for over ten years and was a regular columnist for both Building Design and the Architects' Journal.

== Writing career ==
In 2000, Shonfield authored Walls Have Feelings: Architecture, Film and the City, in which she showed how film and architecture are inter-related, and discussed the tensions between architecture and social change as seen in movies which became a cornerstone of her interpretation of architecture. In 2001, she was a contributory author to the publication This Is What We Do: A Muf Manual and authored the essay "Premature Gratification and Other Pleasures".

=== Bibliography ===
Architecture

- Walls Have Feelings: Architecture, Film and the City (Routledge, 2000)
- At Home with Strangers: Working paper 8: Public Space and the New Urbanity (Comedia, 1998)

Other

- PG Wodehouse's Guide to Surviving Cancer (2003)

== Personal life ==
Shonfield was married to Julian Vaughan Williams with whom she shared a son, Roman. While suffering from cancer she wrote a book entitled PG Wodehouse's Guide To Surviving Cancer. in which she writes humorously, in the style of PG Wodehouse, about her experience of her cancer treatment. This work was developed in partnership with Rosetta Life and was performed at Hampstead Theatre in July 2003. An extract was later included in Creative Engagement in Palliative Care New Perspectives on User Involvement ed Lucinda Jarrett, Sunderarajan Jayaraman, CRC Press (2017).

"The patient feels like a man who, stooping to pluck a nosegay of wild flowers on a railway line, was unexpectedly hit in the small of the back by the Cornish Express. He lies, superfluous behind a stained curtain, and listens to the animal cries of a distinguished Professor as he attempts to turn a junior doctor inside out and make him swallow himself." Katherine Shonfield, PG Wodehouse's Guide To Surviving Cancer (2003)

She died of cancer in 2003. The Architects' Journal (11 September 2003) later noted: "It is unusual for the broadsheets to run obituaries of architectural academics, and unheard of that they should pay tribute to a theorist who was young, female and very much removed from the established academic institutions... [it is a] testament to her success in challenging the conventions of architectural academia."
