= John Martin Alfsen =

Canadian artist (1902–1971)

- Born: John Martin Alfsen; 23 December 1902; Alpena, Michigan
- Died: 30 November 1971 (aged 68); Markham, Ontario
- Education: Ontario College of Art with Arthur Lismer, J.W. Beatty, and F. H. Varley; Art Students League, New York with Kenneth Hayes Miller; Academy of Fine Arts, Antwerp; Académie de la Grande Chaumière, Paris; sculpture, with Antoine Bourdelle
- Spouse: Marion Beatrice Scott (married 1934)
- Awards: Canada Council grants (1958, 1963)

John Martin Alfsen RCA, known more commonly as John Alfsen (23 December 1902 – 30 November 1971) was a painter, known for his portraits, figurative work and paintings of circus life.

== Biography ==
John Martin Alfsen was born in Long Rapids, Michigan, and emigrated to Canada in 1913 as a boy of 11, settling in Toronto. He studied at the Ontario College of Art with Arthur Lismer, F. H. Varley and J.W. Beatty (1920–1922), then at the Royal Academy of Fine Arts Antwerp, and sculpture with Antoine Bourdelle at the Académie de la Grande Chaumière, Paris. Following his year in Europe, he took further study at the Art Students' League, New York, under Kenneth Hayes Miller (1925).

He taught at the Ontario College of Art from 1926 to 1971. For two years, he lived in Sarasota where he taught and painted winter circus people at the Ringling Brothers School of Art. An award was established in his memory at the College in 1986.

His work was featured in an exhibition with Randolph Hewton in 1943 at the then Art Gallery of Toronto, at the Kitchener-Waterloo Art Gallery, Kitchener, Ontario (1958) and recently, in the exhibition Drawn to Dance with York Wilson and Canadian artist Grant Macdonald in 2016 at the DCD Gallery, Toronto.

His works are in public collections such as the National Gallery of Canada, the Art Gallery of Ontario, the Beaverbrook Art Gallery, and the University College Collection of the Art Museum, University of Toronto. Clown Alley in the collection of the Art Gallery of Ontario was painted when the artist was spending the winter with the Ringling Brothers School of Art in Florida. His work can be seen at Alfsen House, 154 Main St. North, Markham, Ontario.

Alfsen was a member of the Royal Canadian Academy of Arts (1959), the Ontario Society of Artists (1939); the Canadian Group of Painters and the Canadian Society of Graphic Art (1956).
