= T. R. MacDonald =

Canadian artist (1908–1978)

- Born: Thomas Reid MacDonald; 28 June 1908; Montreal, Canada
- Died: 15 October 1978 (aged 70); Hamilton, Canada
- Education: Adam Sheriff Scott at his private school (1928–1930), then with Edmond Dyonnet at the Art Association of Montreal (1930–1933)
- Known for: artist, museum director
- Spouse: Rae Hendershot

T. R. MacDonald LL. D. RCA (28 June 1908 – 15 October 1978) was a Canadian painter and photographer of nudes, portraits, still life, and street scenes. As an Official Second World War artist, he served in the First Canadian Infantry Division. In 1947, he became founding curator-director of the Art Gallery of Hamilton (1947–1973) and his "painter's eye" informed and assisted the growth of the gallery for over 25 years. "At the very core he was -- and always remained -- an artist" said Tobi Bruce, author of Lasting Impressions: Celebrated Works from the Art Gallery of Hamilton.

== Biography ==
MacDonald was born in Montreal and studied with Adam Sheriff Scott at his private school (1928–1930), then with Edmond Dyonnet at the Art Association of Montreal (1930–1933). He showed his work with the Arts Club of Montreal in his late twenties and formed many of his friendships with painters there. It provided him with an artistic "brotherhood". Montreal as well immersed him in the work of the vibrant painters of the period, most of whom were figurative, such as Edwin Holgate and many others.

MacDonald enlisted in March 1941 and served with the Canadian Army's 7th Reconnaissance Regiment. He worked first as a service artist, then from 1944 until the end of the war, was made an official war artist, working mostly in northern Italy, holding the rank of lieutenant. He made drawings, watercolours in the field and oil paintings after he returned to London and was discharged from the army in September 1945. The Canadian War Museum has 80 of his artworks in its collection.

In 1946, MacDonald became Head of the Department of Fine Arts at Mount Allison University in Sackville, New Brunswick. He left there in 1947 to become the director and curator of the Art Gallery of Hamilton, Ontario, where he remained until 1973. He was the first paid member of staff in a gallery which had 33 odd paintings in a few rooms in the public library. His post was courtesy of the city's councillors who had authorized $8,500 to revitalize the space.

MacDonald had three objectives: to refurbish the existing facility; to develop a largely Canadian permanent collection; and to undertake exhibitions that would bring Canadian art to Hamilton, all of which he achieved, particularly in the area of collection and exhibition activities. Through MacDonald's initiative and friendships with Canadian art patrons, collectors and artists, he built what was to become one of the major collections of Canadian historical art in the country, as well as early 20th century American and modern British art. He was considered a "collecting genius", buying keynote acquisitions such as Alex Colville's iconic Horse and Train.

In terms of exhibitions, MacDonald's long-term plan was to initiate the Annual Winter Exhibition (1948–1973), a loan exhibition and if of living artists, juried. Though conservative it provided a forum for living artists in the gallery. He was also one of the founders of the Association of International Critics Canada. In 1974, McMaster University in Hamilton, Ontario awarded him an Honorary Doctorate.

MacDonald died while on a trip to Paris in 1978. In 1980, Andrew Oko curated a posthumous retrospective exhibition for the Art Gallery of Hamilton, accompanied by the book/catalogue T. R. MacDonald 1908–1978.

== Work ==
T. R. MacDonald was influenced by the place where he was born and learned to paint. He was a "classicist who established his goals early and did not change as well as perfect them". Painters such as Philip Surrey and Edwin Holgate determined his path as an artist. His greatest strength as an artist came after 1960 when he painted large figurative subjects and portraits emphasizing sculptural qualities.

== Selected exhibitions ==
- Art Association of Montreal (1929–1938);
- Royal Canadian Academy of Arts (1931, 1933, 1935, 1937, 1939 (World's Fair, New York), 1947–1949, 1953, 1956–1958, 1961, 1965–1966, 1968, 1970);
- Arts Club, Montreal (1932, 1935);
- London World's Fair, England;
- 1968: Survey '68, Montreal Museum of Fine Arts;
- 1968: retrospective exhibition of MacDonald's paintings and drawings, McMaster University Art Gallery;
- 1980: T. R. MacDonald 1908–1978, Art Gallery of Hamilton.

== Selected public collections ==
- National Gallery of Canada;
- Art Gallery of Hamilton;
- Confederation Centre Art Gallery, Charlottetown;
- Montreal Museum of Fine Arts.

== Memberships ==
MacDonald was a member of the Montreal Arts Club (1937). He also was an Associate of the Royal Canadian Academy of Arts in 1947 and became a full member in 1960. He was inducted in 2012 into the Hamilton Public Library.
