= Art Canada Institute =

Research organization

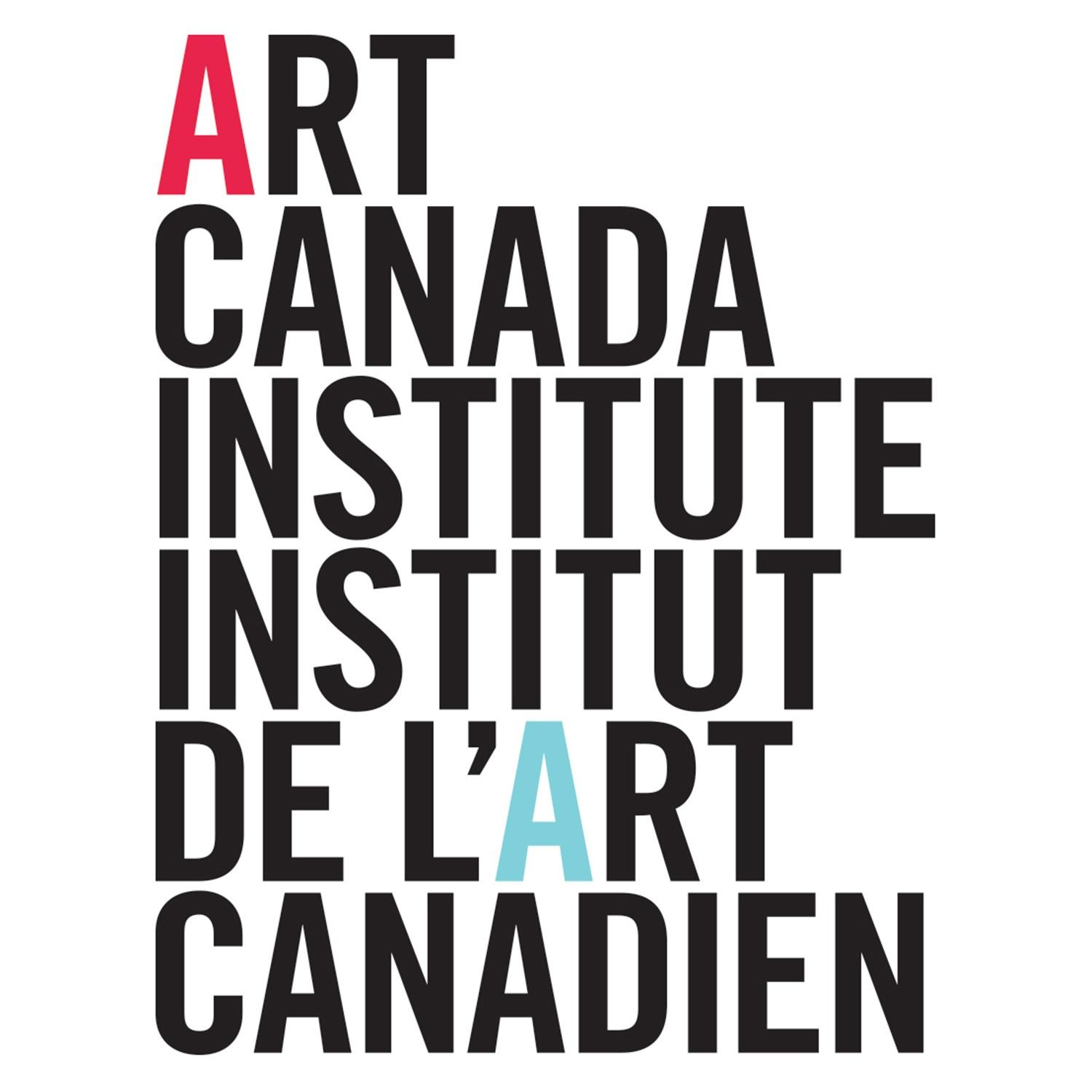
- Formation: 2013
- Founder: Sara Angel
- Type: Nonprofit organization
- Purpose: Advancing the study and public accessibility of Canadian art history
- Headquarters: Massey College, Toronto, Canada
- Website: www.aci-iac.ca

Art Canada Institute is a bilingual, non-profit research organization that aims to promote and support the study of Canadian art history. It has been described as “a comprehensive, multi-tiered, online-based resource for the general public on Canadian art history." The Art Canada Institute's pillars of programming include: The Canadian Online Art Book Project, The Canadian Art Library Series, The Canadian Schools Art Education Program, The Redefining Canadian Art History Fellowship Program, the Art Canada Institute weekly newsletter, and public art talks.

== History ==
Established in 2012, the Art Canada Institute is a non-governmental initiative spearheaded by Founder and Executive Director Sara Angel, C.M.. A Trudeau Scholar and arts journalist with a background in publishing, Angel intended to address what she viewed as an absence of accessible and inclusive material on Canadian visual culture through the creation of the ACI, which has been described as "a comprehensive, multi-tiered, online-based resource for the general public on Canadian art history."

Angel gained the support of John Fraser, who was the master of Massey College in 2010, the year she began her PhD at the University of Toronto. Fraser felt the ACI's goals were in harmony with Vincent Massey's vision of "the coming together of town and gown," and Fraser himself would later become the Institute's Founding Chair.

Angel continued to build support over the next year and a half, but it was only after she was named a Trudeau Foundation Doctoral Scholar and was awarded a generous grant, which she put towards the fledgling ACI, that the Institute became a reality. Since that time the ACI has taken shape and acquired a board of directors, an institute advisory committee, a book project advisory committee, a commissioning editor and a list of over 50 contributing writers. Among ACI's past and present Directors are Gerald McMaster, O.C., Jon S. Dellandrea, C.M. (Chair Emeritus), Charlotte Gray, C.M. (Chair Emeritus), Kiki Delaney, C.M. (Chair Emeritus), Jalynn H. Bennett, C.M., and Roy Heenan, O.C.. In 2023, Angel received an Order of Canada “for her significant contributions to Canadian art history as a visual arts journalist and founder of the Art Canada Institute.”

In its aim to create a central, online, and contemporary resource for Canadian art history, the Art Canada Institute has brought together art historians, curators, and visual culture experts in the creation of original scholarship that reflects "the people, themes and topics that have defined Canada's visual arts heritage." ACI is currently supported through private and corporate donations and is a registered Canadian charity.

== Programs ==
=== The Online Canadian Art Book Project ===
In November 2013, the ACI launched its inaugural program the Online Canadian Art Book Project with the release of Jack Chambers: Life and Work by Mark A. Cheetham, the first in a series of free online e-books. The project is encyclopedic in nature and meant for a general audience, with authors who include art historians and curators from across Canada, contributing original scholarship that addresses subjective topics such as an artist's significance. To date, ACI has published 60 online art books, reaching millions of online readers. The Canadian Online Art Book Project includes books on artists from geographically diverse regions of Canada, such as Annie Pootoogook, Takao Tanabe, Emily Carr, Norval Morrisseau, Mary Pratt, Lionel LeMoine FitzGerald, and Françoise Sullivan.

Each volume is published in English and French in multiple formats, all of which can be downloaded for free on the ACI website. Partnerships with cultural heritage institutions across Canada afforded the ACI a large amount of material and every edition contains reproductions of major works and archival objects, making materials that had been "hidden away in vaults or perhaps able to be seen only at specific galleries" available to a wider audience.

While many of the artists in the series–including Joyce Wieland, Yves Gaucher, Pitseolak Ashoona, Prudence Heward and Harold Town –are considered "seminal figures in Canadian art," the Canadian Online Art Book Project also aims to address "holes in Canadian art history" by featuring artists absent from the mainstream narrative. In an interview founder Angel explains that the ACI means to "redefine the canon" by providing "a balance between well-known artists, such as Michael Snow, and artists who should be household names but are not, such as Kathleen Munn," a painter who was highly respected in her time, but is now on the fringes of the Canadian art historical canon. Recent books in the Art Canada Institute's series on individual artists include: Yousuf Karsh: Life & Work (2025) by Melissa Rombout, George Agnew Reid: Life & Work (2025) by Brian Foss, Kiss & Tell: Lesbian Art & Activism (2025) by Kristen Hutchinson, Quebec City Art & Artists: An Illustrated History (2025) by Michèle Grandbois,Tim Whiten: Life & Work (2025) by Carolyn Bell Farrell, Eli Bornstein: Life & Work (2024) by Roald Nasgaard, Betty Goodwin: Life & Work (2024) by Jessica Bradley, Carl Beam: Life & Work (2024) by Anong Migwans Beam, Takao Tanabe: Life & Work (2023) by Ian M. Thom, Sophie Pemberton: Life & Work (2023) by Katharine Bridge, Alfred Pellan: Life & Work (2023) by Maria Rosa Lehmann, Marion Nicoll: Life & Work (2023) by Catharine Mastin, and Jin-me Yoon: Life & Work (2023) by Ming Tiampo.

=== Print Editions ===
ACI’s Canadian Art Library Series is the first in the nation to focus on monographs about Canadian artists. Titles in this series are print editions of books selected from ACI’s digital library. Up to four titles are published annually.

Notable titles in the Canadian Art Library Series include Revision and Resistance: mistikôsiwak (Wooden Boat People) at The Metropolitan Museum of Art (2020) by Kent Monkman. With contributions from an array of art historians and curators, this book records Monkman's creation of his critically heralded diptych at the Metropolitan Museum of Art, New York. A second ACI book by Monkman, Being Legendary at Royal Ontario Museum: Confronting Colonialism, Rethinking History (2022), was described as “the most provocative of [the] year's Indigenous titles” and named one of the Best Art Books of the Year by Galleries West Magazine.

=== Public Art Talks ===
Another way that the ACI fulfills its mandate to make "Canadian art history a contemporary conversation," is through its series of public lectures. All events in this series are open to the public and spotlight the work of authors of ACI’s online art books, often in conversation with other respected scholars and experts in Canadian art history. Previous talks have focused on diverse topics, such as the lives and legacies of Canadian women artists and the subject of art fraud in Canada.

At an ACI Public Talk in 2021, the artist Kent Monkman spoke for the first time in a live interview about the production of the monumental diptych, mistikôsiwak (Wooden Boat People), commissioned by the Metropolitan Museum of Art, and how the work relates to that museum's North American Indigenous, American, and European art collections, “including challenging such works as the iconic 1851 painting Washington Crossing the Delaware by German-American artist Emanuel Leutze.”

=== The Canadian Schools Art Education Program ===
Created to complement ACI's Canadian Online Art Book Project, The Canadian Schools Art Education Program provides expert-authored teacher resource guides for primary and secondary school educators to facilitate the study of a wide range of subjects through the work of Canadian artists. ACI has published over 50 guides to date, including resources on Kazuo Nakamura and mathematical concepts, developed in partnership with the teacher-based initiative The Art of Math; Iljuwas Bill Reid and ways of knowing; Prudence Heward and early 20th-century women; and Canadian artists and climate change, developed in partnership with the educational non-profit Green Learning. The program also offers Independent Student Learning Activities, which can be distributed directly to students and support learning online and at home. All content is open-source and available to audiences free of charge in English and French.

Each year the Art Canada Institute Education Program presents the Canadian Art Inspiration Student Challenge. As stated in Canadian Teacher Magazine, students in grades 7 through 12 are invited to create original artworks in any medium inspired by the nation's leading artists. Cash prizes of $500 for first-place winners and $250 for honourable mentions are awarded in different age categories.

In 2023, the ACI Education Program won the Ontario Art Education Association‘s Community Art Educator Award.

=== Friday Newsletter ===
ACI’s weekly Friday newsletter keeps readers informed of the organization’s latest programming, and offers curated selections of Canadian artworks that illuminate significant moments in Canadian history as well as current events in the art world.

=== The Redefining Canadian Art History Fellowship Program ===
In 2022 ACI launched The Redefining Canadian Art History Fellowship Program to create a more inclusive art history by supporting studies on Canadian and Indigenous artists whose lives and works are underrepresented. The inaugural research fellows were announced in June 2022.

== Bibliography of ACI Titles ==
The following is a list of online art book titles published by the Art Canada Institute.

=== SEASON 1: 2013–2014 ===
- 2013: Jack Chambers: Life & Work by Mark A. Cheetham
- 2014: Kathleen Munn: Life & Work by Georgiana Uhlyarik
- 2014: Michael Snow: Life & Work by Martha Langford
- 2014: William Notman: Life & Work by Sarah Parsons
- 2014: Paul-Émile Borduas: Life & Work by François-Marc Gagnon
- 2014: Zacharie Vincent: Life & Work by Louise Vigneault

=== SEASON 2: 2014–2015 ===
- 2014: Harold Town: Life & Work by Gerta Moray
- 2014: Joyce Wieland: Life & Work by Johanne Sloan
- 2014: Paul Kane: Life & Work by Arlene Gehmacher
- 2015: Emily Carr: Life & Work by Lisa Baldissera
- 2015: Yves Gaucher: Life & Work by Roald Nasgaard
- 2015: Pitseolak Ashoona: Life & Work by Christine Lalonde

=== SEASON 3: 2015–2016 ===
- 2015: Oscar Cahén: Life & Work by Jaleen Grove
- 2015: Prudence Heward: Life & Work by Julia Skelley
- 2015: Tom Thomson: Life & Work by David P. Silcox
- 2016: Jean Paul Lemieux: Life & Work by Michèle Grandbois
- 2016: Norval Morrisseau: Life & Work by Carmen Robertson
- 2016: General Idea: Life & Work by Sarah E.K. Smith

=== SEASON 4: 2016–2017 ===
- 2016: Greg Curnoe: Life & Work by Judith Rodger
- 2016: Jock Macdonald: Life & Work by Joyce Zemans
- 2016: Paraskeva Clark: Life & Work by Christine Boyanoski
- 2017: Shuvinai Ashoona: Life & Work by Nancy G. Campbell
- 2017: William Kurelek: Life & Work by Andrew Kear
- 2017: Louis Nicolas: Life & Work by François-Marc Gagnon

=== SEASON 5: 2017–2018 ===
- 2017: Alex Colville: Life & Work by Ray Cronin
- 2017: Lionel LeMoine FitzGerald: Life & Work by Michael-Parke Taylor
- 2017: Helen McNicoll: Life & Work by Samantha Burton
- 2018: Paterson Ewen: Life & Work by John G. Hatch
- 2018: Françoise Sullivan: Life & Work by Annie Gerin
- 2018: Robert Houle: Life & Work by Shirley Madill

=== SEASON 6: 2018–2019 ===
- 2018: Bertram Brooker: Life & Work by James King
- 2018: Homer Watson: Life & Work by Brian Foss
- 2018: Molly Lamb Bobak: Life & Work by Michelle Gewurtz
- 2019: Gershon Iskowitz: Life & Work by Ihor Holubizky
- 2019: Oviloo Tunnillie: Life & Work by Darlene Wight
- 2019: Ozias Leduc: Life & Work by Laurier Lacroix

=== SEASON 7: 2019–2020 ===
- 2019: Mary Hiester Reid: Life & Work by Andrea Terry
- 2019: Agnes Martin: Life & Work by Christopher Régimbal
- 2019: Jean Paul Riopelle: Life & Work by François-Marc Gagnon
- 2020: Sorel Etrog: Life & Work by Alma Mikulinsky
- 2020: Mary Pratt: Life & Work by Ray Cronin
- 2020: Annie Pootoogook: Life & Work by Nancy G. Campbell

=== SEASON 8: 2020–2021 ===
- 2020: William Brymner: Life & Work by Jocelyn Anderson
- 2020: Bill Reid: Life & Work by Gerald McMaster
- 2021: Suzy Lake: Life & Work by Erin Silver
- 2021: Walter Seymour Allward: Life & Work by Philip Dombowsky
- 2021: Kazuo Nakamura: Life & Work by John G. Hatch

=== SEASON 9: 2021–2022 ===
- 2021: Maud Lewis: Life & Work by Ray Cronin
- 2021: War Art in Canada: An Illustrated History by Laura Brandon
- 2022: Kent Monkman: Life & Work by Shirley Madill
- 2022: Arnaud Maggs: Life & Work by Anne Cibola
- 2022: Gathie Falk: Life & Work by Michelle Jacques
- 2022: Ottawa Art & Artists: An Illustrated History by Jim Burant

=== SEASON 10: 2022–2023 ===
- 2022: Jin-me Yoon: Life & Work by Ming Tiampo
- 2022: Marion Nicoll: Life & Work by Catharine Mastin
- 2023: Alfred Pellan: Life & Work by Maria Rosa Lehmann

=== SEASON 11: 2023–2024 ===
- 2023: Photography in Canada, 1839–1989: An Illustrated History by Sarah Bassnett and Sarah Parsons
- 2023: Halifax Art & Artists: An Illustrated History by Ray Cronin
- 2023: Sophie Pemberton: Life & Work by Kathryn Bridge
- 2023: Takao Tanabe: Life & Work by Ian Thom
- 2024: Margaret Watkins: Life & Work by Mary O’Connor
- 2024: Doris McCarthy: Life & Work by John G. Hatch

=== SEASON 12: 2024–2025 ===
- 2024: Carl Beam: Life & Work by Anong Migwans Beam
- 2024: Betty Goodwin: Life & Work by Jessica Bradley
- 2024: Eli Bornstein: Life & Work by Roald Nasgaard
- 2025: Tim Whiten: Life & Work by Carolyn Bell Farrell
- 2025: Quebec City Art & Artists: An Illustrated History by Michèle Grandbois
- 2025: Kiss & Tell: Lesbian Art & Activism by Kristen Hutchinson

=== SEASON 13: 2025–2026 ===
- 2025: George Agnew Reid: Life & Work by Brian Foss
- 2025: Yousuf Karsh: Life & Work by Melissa Rombout
- 2025: Hannah Maynard: Life & Work by Elizabeth Anne Cavaliere
- 2026: William Raphael: Life & Work by Pierre-Olivier Ouellet
- 2026: Regina Art & Artists: An Illustrated History by Philip Dombowsky
- 2026: Wabanaki Modern: The Artistic Legacy of the 1960s "Micmac Indian Craftsmen" by Emma Hassencahl-Perley & John Leroux

=== SEASON 14: 2026–2027 ===
- 2026: Art, Truth & Reconciliation: Indigenous Testimony in the Aftermath of Canada's Residential Schools by Gerald McMaster
- 2026: Christopher Pratt: Life & Work by Mireille Eagan
- 2026: Pegi Nicol MacLeod: Life & Work by Devon Smither
