= Pacific (painting) =

1967 painting by Alex Colville

- Artist: Alex Colville
- Year: 1967
- Medium: Acrylic polymer emulsion on hardboard
- Dimensions: 53.3 x 53.5 cm

Pacific is an acrylic painting by Canadian artist Alex Colville, currently held in a private collection. It was painted in Santa Cruz during the latter half of 1967 while he was teaching at the University of California. It is one of his best known works, and as of 2014, is Colville's most requested reproduction.

== Description ==
Pacific depicts a shirtless man leaning against a doorframe with his back to the viewer while he looks out to a tranquil ocean. The back of his head is cropped out of frame, leaving his identity a mystery. In the foreground of the painting is a Browning Hi-Power pistol resting upon a weathered sewing table, which has a ruler embossed along one of its edges.

== Themes and composition ==
The painting has been noted for its foreboding nature; Canadian art curator Ray Cronin highlights the tension created by the pistol in the foreground and attributes it to Colville's influence by French existentialism and post war responses to a world seemingly devoid of morality, with a final suicidal act seeming ever the more tempting. Mark Cheetham concurred and thought the gun was a sign that the man was contemplating a violent act, possibly suicide. Cheetham further noted the handgun was the service pistol used by Colville during the Second World War and that the table upon which it rests had belonged to his late mother, strongly indicating that the man in the painting is Colville himself. Upon its completion, Colville said of it "I don't think the painting is about suicide". He further explained that "I think of the gun and the table as being necessary parts of life, upon which it is sometimes possible to turn one's back".

Others have noted the motif of measurement, seen in the ruler embossed into the surface of the table, and the watch on the man's left wrist, which he keeps at arms length, perhaps wanting to avoid an accidental glimpse of the time. The man pays little attention to the instruments of measurement, instead opting to turn his back to them in order to contemplate the gently swaying ocean. The obscured watch face is augmented by Colville's neutral lighting, making it as difficult for the viewer to judge the time of day as it is for the man in ignorance of his watch. Cronin points out that the Pacific was originally named as Mar Pacífico by Ferdinand Magellan, meaning peaceful sea in Portuguese.

== Influence and legacy ==
Cronin described the scene as being "evocative" and "powerful", being one of Colville's "most overtly dramatic paintings since Horse and Train". The painting served as inspiration for a definitive shot in Michael Mann's 1995 film Heat, with actor Robert De Niro leaving a handgun on a table before assuming a similar pose to the man in Colville's painting. Mann said he chose Colville's work as a basis for his shot as he thought that within the painting was a man who lived a life steeped in "aggression and action", and yet privately, he was also in a "condition of loneliness".
