= Onoda =

Onoda may refer to:

== People with the surname ==
- Chiyotaro Onoda (小野田 千代太郎, 1896–1944), Japanese Go player
- Hiroo Onoda (小野田 寛郎, 1922–2014), Japanese soldier stationed in the Philippines during World War II who did not surrender until 1974
- Kazuo Onoda (小野田 一雄, 1900–1983), Japanese swimmer
- Kimi Onoda (小野田 紀美, born 1982), Japanese politician
- Masahito Onoda (小野田 将人, born 1996), Japanese footballer
- Minoru Onoda (小野田 實, 1937–2008), Japanese artist, member of Gutai Group
- Toshiya Onoda (小野田 稔也, born 1970), Japanese bobsledder
- Yoshiki Onoda (小野田 嘉幹, born 1925), Japanese film director and writer

== Places ==
- Onoda Line, a railway line in Yamaguchi Prefecture, Japan
- Onoda Station, a railway station in Sanyo-Onoda, Yamaguchi Prefecture, Japan
- Onoda, Yamaguchi, a city in Yamaguchi Prefecture, Japan
- Onoda, Miyagi, a former town located in Miyagi Prefecture, Japan. It became a part of Kami, Miyagi in 2003.

== Other uses ==
- Onoda: 10,000 Nights in the Jungle, 2021 film
