= Sara Angel =

Canadian art historian

Sara Angel C.M.
- Born: Toronto, Ontario, Canada
- Education: McGill University; University of Toronto
- Occupations: Art historian, journalist, arts advocate
- Employer: York University
- Known for: Founder and executive director of the Art Canada Institute

Sara Angel, C.M. is a Canadian art historian, journalist and arts advocate best known as the founder and executive director of the Art Canada Institute.

== Early career in publishing and journalism ==
Born and raised in Toronto, Angel worked for 15 years in arts publishing and journalism before entering academia. She began her career in 1992 as an editor at Macfarlane Walter & Ross, then as the editorial director at Bruce Mau Design. She moved to London, UK to work as a commissioning senior editor at Phaidon Press. Returning to Canada in 1999, she founded Otherwise Editions and Angel Editions, both companies that specialized in packaging innovative illustrated books. Angel also served as a commentator for CBC television’s On the Arts, an editor for Saturday Night magazine, a columnist for the National Post, and editor-in-chief of Chatelaine.

== Education and academic career ==
Angel completed a PhD in art history at the University of Toronto. Her doctoral research focused on the restitution of Nazi-looted art. Her thesis was on the case of Montreal art dealer Max Stern, who was forced by the Nazi regime in 1937 to auction more than 300 works after being prohibited from selling art under antisemitic policies. Angel’s research documented the restitution of twelve lost works recovered between 2003 and 2012. Angel also holds a joint Bachelor of Arts in Art History & History from McGill University.

Angel has taught courses on art restitution and art crime as an adjunct professor at York University and been a guest lecturer at institutions including Harvard University, the Art Gallery of Ontario and the National Gallery of Canada. In 2024, Angel was appointed a Member of the Order of Canada for her contributions to Canadian art history as a visual arts journalist and founder of the Art Canada Institute.

== Founding the Art Canada Institute ==
While teaching art history as a graduate student at the University of Toronto, Angel identified a lack of accessible and comprehensive public resources on Canadian art history, which motivated her to develop a national digital platform to address this gap. In 2013, she founded the Art Canada Institute at Massey College, where she was a Junior Fellow, working with its then Master (now Principal) John Fraser. She used funding from her Pierre Elliott Trudeau Foundation doctoral scholarship to support the institute’s early development and planning.

== Personal life ==
Angel lives in Toronto with her husband and three children.
