= Horse and Train =

1954 painting by Alex Colville

- Artist: Alex Colville
- Year: 1954
- Medium: Caesin tempera on hardboard
- Dimensions: 41.2 cm × 54.2 cm (16.2 in × 21.3 in)
- Location: Art Gallery of Hamilton, Hamilton, Ontario

Horse and Train is a casein painting by Canadian artist Alex Colville, from 1954. Described by Ray Cronin as being "among the most recognizable images in Canadian art", it is held at the Art Gallery of Hamilton, in Hamilton, Ontario.

== Description ==
The painting depicts a dark horse approaching an oncoming train on an empty track.

Horse and Train was inspired by both J. M. W. Turner's 1844 painting Rain, Steam and Speed – The Great Western Railway, as well as a couplet from South African poet Roy Campbell's 1949 poem "Dedication to Mary Campbell":

Against a regiment I oppose a brain

And a dark horse against an armoured train.

— Roy Campbell

In 1953, Colville met Campbell at Mount Allison University in Sackville, New Brunswick, during a North America tour. In March 1954, Colville created a study sheet, in which his sketches contained a notation of Campbell's poem.

Horse and Train was acquired by the Art Gallery of Hamilton in Hamilton, Ontario in early 1957, after winning the gallery's annual Winter Show purchase prize.

== Influence and legacy ==
Horse and Train was described by Ray Cronin as being "among the most recognizable images in Canadian art", and is further described by Encyclopædia Britannica as a notable example of the "meticulous and time-consuming methods" Colville was known for. The painting was used as the cover art for Bruce Cockburn's 1973 album Night Vision, and was additionally used during a scene in Stanley Kubrick's 1980 psychological horror film The Shining.
