= Laura Brandon =

Canadian art historian (born 1951)

- Born: Laura Elizabeth Brandon; 1951; London, United Kingdom
- Known for: Canadian war art historian; former Historian of war collections, Canadian War Museum, Ottawa
- Awards: Order of Canada (2015)

Laura Brandon (born 1951) is a Canadian war art historian and the former Historian, Art & War at the Canadian War Museum, Ottawa. She is the author or co-author of many books, chapters in books and articles in journals such as Canadian Military History and RACAR: Revue d'art canadienne / Canadian Art Review. She specializes in writing about the official Canadian artists of the First and Second World War as well as on the role of women artists in the Forces. She was appointed to the Order of Canada in 2015.

== Early years ==
Brandon was born in London, United Kingdom and received her B.A. from the University of Bristol in 1973 in art history. She moved to Canada in 1976 and received her M.A. from Queen's University Kingston, Ontario (1992). Her Master's thesis was titled "'Exploring the Undertheme': The Self-Portraits of Pegi Nicol MacLeod (1904-1949)". She received her Ph.D. in history from Carleton University in Ottawa (2002). Her Ph.D. dissertation was titled "The Canadian War Museum's Art Collections as a Site of Meaning, Memory, and Identity in the Twentieth Century".

== Career ==
From 1992 to 2015, she served as the Historian, Art & War at the Canadian War Museum, Ottawa and curated exhibitions and built the collection. She was also an Adjunct Research Professor in the School for Studies in Art and Culture and in the History Department at Carleton University, Ottawa, Ontario as well as a Research Associate at the Canadian War Museum. She has lectured nationally and internationally.

== Writing ==
Brandon has published extensively on war art and on the artists in the collection of the Canadian War Museum in books, journals, and encyclopedia articles which she authored or co-authorized such as "Canvas of war: painting the Canadian experience, 1914 to 1945", praised by peers and "Art or Memorial? The Forgotten History of Canada's War Art" (Calgary: University of Calgary Press, 2006) as well as on Pegi Nicol MacLeod, in "Pegi by Herself: The Life of Pegi Nicol MacLeod, Canadian Artist" (Montreal: McGill–Queen's University Press, 2005). In 2021, she wrote "War Art in Canada: An Illustrated History" for the Art Canada Institute.

== Awards ==
- 2000: Canadian Museums Association Award for Outstanding Achievement in the Exhibitions Category for "Canvas of War: Masterpieces from the Canadian War Museum";
- 2006: Ontario Historical Association's Alison Prentice Award for the best book in women's history in the past three years for "Pegi By Herself";
- 2006: Shortlisted for Ottawa Book Award for "Pegi By Herself" Canadian Museums Association Award;
- 2012: Queen Elizabeth II Diamond Jubilee Medal;
- 2015: Order of Canada;
