= Sarah Hart (artist) =

Canadian artist and educator (1880–1981)

- Born: Sarah Alice Stewart; February 10, 1880; Saint John, New Brunswick
- Died: July 3, 1981 (aged 101); Sackville, New Brunswick

Sarah Hart (née Stewart, February 10, 1880 – July 3, 1981) was a Canadian artist and educator.

== Life and career ==
Sarah Alice Hart was born in Saint John, New Brunswick, on February 10, 1880. She studied at the Women's Art School, the Art Students League and The Cooper Union in New York City. An early student of John Hammond, Hart joined the teaching staff of the Applied Arts program at Mount Allison University in 1907, where she taught leather tooling until 1913. Sarah Hart married Sackville Dentist Dr. Edward Hart, a widower with three sons in 1914. She then had two children of her own before rejoining the Applied Arts faculty at Mount Allison in 1928, to teach wood carving which she taught until 1961. After her retirement she continued to paint with a local arts group.

In the 1930s and 1940s Hart taught weekly painting, drawing, and sculpture art classes in local communities as a part of an extension initiative by Mount Allison University. She taught these extension courses in local communities including Amherst, NS, where high school student Alex Colville attended her classes.

During WWII she taught handcrafts including weaving, leather tooling and silverwork to Royal Canadian Air Force members in five wards of a hospital in Moncton, NB.

Hart died on July 3, 1981, at the Drew Nursing Home in Sackville, at the age of 101.

== Collections ==
- Owens Art Gallery, Mount Allison University
