= Gerta Moray =

Canadian art historian (born 1940)

- Born: 16 April 1940 (age 86); Krnov, Czechoslovakia
- Known for: art historian, educator

Gerta Moray (born 16 April 1940) is a Canadian art historian, educator and writer. Her career has spanned five decades. She is best known for her substantial book and writings on Emily Carr.

== Early years and career ==
Moray was born in Krnov, Czechoslovakia, and emigrated to England. She studied in France, receiving a diploma from the Institute of Language and French Culture in Lyon. In England, she received a M.A. from Oxford University, and a Postgraduate Diploma from the Courtauld Institute of Art, then for many years taught art history at the University of Sheffield, the University of Stirling, and University of Edinburgh. In 1970 she came to Canada, settling in Toronto, then moved back to England for a time in 1971, continuing to teach and publishing scholarly articles on art history in The Burlington Magazine and elsewhere. She returned to Canada in 1981 and in 1889 began to teach at the School of Fine Art and Music (SOFAM) of the University of Guelph. Moray taught art history at the University of Guelph from 1989 to 2005 and retired as a Professor Emerita of the University. She also taught and lectured at the University of Toronto, the Nova Scotia College of Art and Design (NSCAD) and the Ontario College of Art and Design (OCAD).

In the 1980s, wanting to know about Canada, she noticed that no one had worked in depth on Carr and her relationship with the First Nations and started to work on the subject. She received her Ph.D. in the History of Art from the University of Toronto (1993) with a thesis on "Northwest Coast Native Culture and the Early Indian Paintings of Emily Carr, 1899-1913".

== Writing ==
During the years she taught at university in Canada, she wrote or contributed essays to catalogues of exhibitions or books and lectured on the art of Canadian women artists such as Mary Pratt (1989), Suzy Lake (1992), Natalka Husar (2010), Margaret Priest (2011), Landon Mackenzie (2014), Lilias Torrance Newton (2021) and most notably Emily Carr. She devoted forty years to researching Carr's career and relationship with the First Nations of British Columbia. Her major monograph on Carr was Unsettling Encounters: First Nations Imagery and the Art of Emily Carr (2006) which is said to have respectfully responded to aboriginal memories and perspectives as well as to race relations and the colonial and patriarchal history of British Columbia and Canada. It is considered to be outstanding, by peers such as the curators and writers on Carr such as Charles C. Hill and Ian M. Thom and the general public alike.

Before its publication and since, Moray has weighed in on issues such as gender and Canadian identity, and Modernism and Emily Carr and has often written about them in articles and books such as Beyond Wilderness : The Group of Seven, Canadian Identity and Contemporary Art (2007). In the textbook The Visual Arts in Canada: The Twentieth Century (2010), she wrote the chapter on "Emily Carr, Modernism, Cultural Identity, and Ethnocultural Art History". In From the forest to the sea: Emily Carr in British Columbia edited by Sarah Milroy and Ian Dejardin (2014), she wrote the chapter on "The modern moment: Emily Carr's Kitwancool Totems". In Embracing Canada: landscapes from Krieghoff to the Group of Seven (2015), she wrote the chapter on "Emily Carr and the visionary British Columbia landscape". In Canada and Impressionism: new horizons, 1880-1930 (2019), she wrote the chapter on "Painting Canada: from Impressionism to Modernism". Here, she focused upon the groundwork of modernism in Canada and how a following generation of artists, among them Carr, would take up new possibilities. She found such possibilities to be expressed in the "modernist anti-modernism" attitudes of the Group of Seven.

Besides her writing on Carr, she has written an e-book on Harold Town: life & work. Moray continues to write and lecture in connection with modern and contemporary art, and Canadian art.

== Awards and honours ==
- 2007, Winner - Clio Award (British Columbia), Canadian Historical Association;
- 2007, Nominated for British Columbia's National Award for Canadian Non-Fiction;
