= Mistikôsiwak (Wooden Boat People) =

2019 pair of paintings by Kent Monkman

Mistikôsiwak (Wooden Boat People) is a 2019 pair of monumental historical paintings (Welcoming the Newcomers and Resurgence of the People) by the Canadian First Nations artist of mixed Cree and Irish descent, Kent Monkman.

The works were commissioned by the Metropolitan Museum of Art to comment from a native perspective upon their collection of Western Art. They formed part of an ongoing series of works commissioned by the museum to reflect upon the art institution's collection and the colonialist history of and the conditions in which the works were created and acquired.

The 2019 canvases are placed on opposite sides of the great hall of the museum and each measures almost 11 by 22 feet (3.4 by 6.7 m) in size.

== Publication ==
The diptych is documented in the book Revision and Resistance: mistikôsiwak (Wooden Boat People) at The Metropolitan Museum of Art, published by the Art Canada Institute. The publication includes essays, interviews, and photographic documentation of the paintings and their installation, with contributions from scholars and museum professionals including Sasha Suda, Ruth B. Phillips, Mark Salber Phillips, Jami Powell, Shirley Madill, and Nick Estes.
