= Minoru Onoda =

- Born: 1937; Manshu, North-East District, China (Japanese-occupied Manchuria Jilin Province, China)
- Died: 2008 (aged 70–71); Himeji, JP
- Occupation: Artist

Minoru Onoda (小野田 實, Onoda Minoru) was an important member of the Gutai Group's younger generation having joined the group in 1965. His 'Paintings of Propagation' theory was a crucial step in his early career. He was included in the important retrospectives on the Gutai Group at the Solomon R. Guggenheim Museum in New York in 2013 and the National Art Center in Tokyo in 2012. The 2022 Gutai retrospectives 'Into the Unknown World – GUTAI: differentiation and Integration', National Museum of Art, Osaka, and Nakanoshima Museum of Art, Osaka, JP included many of his works.

== Biography ==
Minoru Onoda was born 1937 in Manshu, North-East District, China (Japanese-occupied Manchuria Jilin Province, China). He studied at the Institute of Fine Arts, Osaka, Japan from 1956 to 1958 and from 1958–1960 at the Osaka School of Art (currently Osaka College of Art). He lived most of his life in Himeji, Japan where he died in 2008.

After publishing his "Paintings of Propagation' theory in 1961 and participating in the 3rd International Exhibition for Young Artists in Paris in 1964, Onoda Minoru joined Gutai and stayed faithful to their leader Yoshihara Jiro's motto to "do what has never been done before" for the rest of his career. The Gutai Group was the first radical artistic movement after World War II in Japan. This influential group was involved in large-scale multimedia environments, performances, and theatrical events and emphasizes the relationship between body and matter in pursuit of originality.

Through newly-available materials and artistic freedom post WWII, Onoda questioned new forms, styles and hierarchy through lines and circles.

Awed by manufacturing concepts of repetition and quantity, he chose amalgamations of gradually-sized dots on panel with relief, creating organically-growing shapes, progressing to infinite circles and finally monochrome painting where the edge matters.

During his lifetime Onoda chose to sell primarily to museums and institutions. His paintings have been extensively exhibited in Japan and were included in the major retrospectives: "Gutai, The Spirit of an Era", National Art Center Tokyo, in 2012 and "Gutai : Splendid Playground” at the Solomon R. Guggenheim Museum, New York, in 2013.

A Monograph on the artist containing 232 pages and over 170 photographs was published in 2019 by Anne Mosseri-Marlio Galerie through the publisher Scheidegger & Spiess- English and Japanese editions (ISBN 978-3-85881-821-8, 978-3858818225)

At the occasion of the major retrospective at the Himeji City Museum of Art, Seigensha published a second monograph on the Gutai artist Minoru Onoda with 432 pages. All essays are in both Japanese and English (ISBN 978-4-86152-829-3).

== Selected solo exhibitions ==
2022	KIAF, Seoul, KR by Anne Mosseri-Marlio Galerie, Basel, CH
2021	Watashi no Maru (My Circles); Himeji City Art Museum, Himeji, JP (cat.) Through another Lens; Anne Mosseri-Marlio Galerie, Basel, CH
2020	1960 Onwards; Anne Mosseri-Marlio Galerie, Basel, CH
2019	Taipai Dangdai, Taipei, TW by Anne Mosseri-Marlio Galerie, Basel, CH
2018	Art Brussels, Brussels, BE by Anne Mosseri-Marlio Galerie, Basel, CH
	Taka Ishii Gallery, New York, US
2017	Taka Ishii Gallery, Tokyo, JP
	Frieze Masters, London, UK by Anne Mosseri-Marlio Galerie, Basel, CH
	Anne Mosseri-Marlio Galerie, Basel, CH
2004	Onoda’s World, Himeji City Museum, Himeji, JP
1999	Hotel Seashore Mitsumisaki, Tatsuno, JP
1986	Amano Gallery, Osaka, JP
	History of Minoru Onoda: 1953 - 1986, Renga-Sha, Himeji, JP
1985	Gallery Koma, Himeji, JP
1982	Atelier Nishinomiya, Nishinomiya, JP
1980	Suntory Foundation, Osaka, JP
1979	Imabashi Gallery, Osaka, JP
1977	Shunko Gallery, Osaka, JP
	Art Core Gallery, Kyoto, JP
	GE Exhibition, Prefectural Art Gallery, Osaka, JP
1974	Hakusan Gallery, Kobe, JP
1970	Minoru Onoda Atelier, Himeji, JP
1967	Stage set: The 2nd Himeji Festival “Jyoukamachi Ourai”
1965	Gallery Daiwa, Kobe, JP
1964	Lunami Gallery, Tokyo, JP
	Gallery 16, Kyoto, JP
1961	‘Paintings of propagation’, Himeji, JP

== Selected recent group exhibitions ==
2023	Le Sacre du Printemps, Himeji City Museum of Art, Himeji, JP
2022	Allusive Variation : Honkadori and Museum Masterpieces, Himeji City Museum of Art, Himeji, JP
	Into the Unknown World – GUTAI: differentiation and Integration, National Museum of Art, Osaka, JP (October 2022 in 2 venues)
	Into the Unknown World – GUTAI: differentiation and Integration, Nakanoshima Museum of Art, Osaka, JP (October 2022 in 2 venues)
2021	Ways of Seeing: Three Takes on The Jack Shear Collection, The Drawing Center, New York, NY, USA
2020	Game of Sight: the delightful connection between Art and Eyes, Hyogo Prefectural Museum of Art, Hyogo, JP
	ASHIYA TIME: a Large Collection Exhibition-1991-2020, Ashiya City Museum of Art & History, Ashiya, JP
	Expo’70 Special Exhibition, Museum of Osaka University, Osaka, JP
2019	Ashiya City Museum of Art & History, Ashiya, JP
	Special exhibition-Gutai collection, Hyogo Prefectural Museum of Art, Hyogo, JP
2018	Back to 1918: Time Travel with the Museum Collection, Hyogo Prefectural Museum of Art, Kobe, JP
	Taka Ishii Gallery, New York, NY, US
2017	The Collection, Hyogo Prefectural Museum of Art, Kobe, JP
2015	“Gutai-Jin”, Karuizawa New Museum, Karuizawa, JP
	“Konnasozaide art sakuhin”, Himeji City Museum of Art, Himeji, JP
	“ZERO, GUTAI, KUSAMA”, Bonhams, London, EN
2014	“GUTAI × INTERNATIONAL : GUTAI, UMIWOWATARU”, Ashiya City Museum of Art and History, Ashiya, JP
2013	“Gutai : Splendid Playground”, Solomon R. Guggenheim Museum of Art, New York, NY, US
	The Collection “GUTAI YAKUSHIN”, Ashiya City Museum of Art and History, Ashiya, JP
2012	“Gutai, The Spirit of an Era”, National Art Center Tokyo, Tokyo, JP
	“Modern Art Collection of Japan and Overseas”, The Miyagi Museum of Art, Sendai, JP
	Collection III “KONNAHITOGAITA! HYOGO BIJYUTUKA RETSUDEN”, The Hyogo Prefectural Museum of Art, Kobe, JP
2006	“Iro to Katachi no Harmony” (Harmony of Colors and Shapes), Himeji City Museum of Art, Himeji, JP
2004	“Gutai Retrospective”, Hyogo Prefectural Museum of Art, Kobe, JP
2002	“From the Collection : Artists of the Gutai Group”, Miyagi Museum of Art, Sendai, JP
1998	Collection of the Himeji City Museum of Art for the last 15 years, Himeji, JP
	Artists of GUTAI Group, Miyagi Museum of Art, Sendai, JP
1997	5 Modern Artists of Hyogo, Mori Gallery, Himeji, JP
	Materials and Expressions, Collection of the Himeji City Museum of Art, Himeji, JP
1996	Pictures for the Sky - Art Kite Show, Museo Nacional de Bellas Artes, Buenos Aires, AR; Museo Nacional de Artes Visuales, Montervideo, UY
	A turning point in Japanese Art – 1964, Museum of Contemporary Art, Tokyo, JP
	96 Artists of Hyogo, Hyogo Prefectural Museum of Art, Kobe, JP
	Himeji Bijutsu Kyokai, Phoenix Exhibition, Phoenix, AZ, US
	50 years of ‘Osaka Bijutsu Kenkyuusho’, Institute of Fine Arts, Osaka City Museum of Fine Arts, Osaka, JP
1995	Pictures for the Sky - Art Kite Show, Musik-und Kongresshalle, Lubeck, DE; Musée des Beaux Arts, Montreal, CA; Darling Harbour Exhibition Centre, Sydney, AU; Pontificia Universidad Catolica de Chile, Santiago, CL
	50 years of the Post War Art, Collection of the Himeji City Museum of Art Himeji City Museum of Art, Himeji, JP
1994	Erabareta Katachi, Himeji City Museum of Art, Himeji, JP
1993	GUTAI Exhibition III 1965-1972, Ashiya City Museum of Art and History, Ashiya, JP
	The 3rd Modern Artists Exhibition, Renaissance Square, Himeji, JP
	Hyogo Artists Exhibition - Artists of Harima, Kaibundou Gallery, Kobe, JP
1992	Art Kites : Pictures for the Sky / Kunstdrachen. Bilder für den Himmel, Expo Sevilla, Pabellon de Bellas Artes, Sevilla; Sala de Exposiciones de la Maestranza, Sevila, ES; Galleria nazionale d’arte moderna e contemporanea, Rome, IT; Documenta Halle, Kassel, DE
	The Artists of Gutai Group - Focusing on the collections of the Miyagi Museum of Art, Miyagi Museum of Art, Sendai, JP
	150 out of 1500 – Collection of the Himeji City Museum of Art for the last 10 years, Himeji City Museum of Art, Himeji, JP
1991	Art Kites : Pictures for the Sky / Kunstdrachen. Bilder für den Himmel, Promotrice delle Belle Arti, Turin, IT; Charlottenburg, Copenhagen DK; Neue Nationalgalerie, Staatliche Museen zu Berlin, Berlin, DE; Musée royaux des Beaux-Arts de Belgique, Brussels, BE; Centro de Arte Moderna (CAM), Fundacao Calouste Gulbenkian, Lisbon, PT
	Abstraction and Illusion - Exhibition of the Collection of the Himeji City Museum of Art, Himeji City Museum of Art, Himeji, JP
1990	Art Kites : Pictures for the Sky, Deichtorhallen, Hamburg, DE; Central House of Artists, Moscow, RU; Kunstsammlung Nordrhein-Westfalen Düsseldorf, DE; L’Art prend l’air. Cerfs-volants d’artistes / Kunstdrachen. Bilder für den Himmel, Grande Halle de la Villete, Paris, FR; Haus der Kunst, Munich; K20, Düsseldorf; Alte Nationalgalerie, Berlin DE
1989	Art Kites : Pictures for the Sky / Kunstdrachen. Bilder für den Himmel, Hiroshima City Museum of Contemporary Art, Hiroshima; Nagoya City Art Museum, Nagoya; Shizuoka Prefectural Museum of Art, Shizuoka City; Hara Museum ARC, Shibukawa; Himeji City Museum of Art, Himeji, JP (Presided by the Osaka Goethe Institut )
	Vernissage in the sky, Himeji, JP
	Kumamoto Prefectural Museum of Art, Kumamoto, JP
	Takamatsu Art Museum, Takamatsu, JP
1988	Art Kites : Pictures for the Sky / Kunstdrachen. Bilder für den Himmel", Museum of Modern Art, Shiga; Mie Prefectural Museum, Tsu; Miyagi Museum of Art, Miyagi, JP
	88 Artists of Hyogo, Hyogo Prefectural Museum of Modern Art, Kobe, JP
1987	40th Anniversary of ‘Osaka Bijutsu Kenkyuusho', Institute of Fine Arts, Osaka City Museum of Fine Arts, Osaka, JP
	36 Local Artists Exhibition, Ymatoyashiki Gallery, Himeji, JP
	The First Modern Art Exhibition, Renaissance Square, Himeji, JP
1986	Ge Exhibition, Kyoto, Kyoto Municipal Museum of Art, Kyoto, JP
	The 7th Neo Art Exhibition, Fuji Gallery, Osaka, JP
1985	Jiro Yoshihara and ‘Gutai’, Ashiya Civic Center, Ashiya, JP
	Ge Feature Exhibition, ABC Gallery, Osaka, JP
1984	Gifu Independent Festival – the trend in twenty years, Museum of Fine Arts Gifu, Gifu, JP
	Ima kaiga ha - Osaka ’84, Osaka Contemporary Art Center, Osaka, JP
1981	A Scene of Contemporary Japanese Art, Miyagi Prefectural Art Museum, Miyagi, JP
	Hyogo Modern Art Exhibition, Hyogo Prefectural Museum of Art, Kobe, JP
1980	The First Kakuutsuushin Tent Bijutsukan, Shukugawa Park, Nishinomiya, JP
	Artists’ Union Symposium ’80, Tokyo Metropolitan Art Museum, Tokyo, JP
1979	Jiro Yoshihara and Today’s Aspects of the ‘Gutai', Hyogo Prefectural Museum of Modern Art, Kobe, JP
	The 5th Hiroshima Renaissance Art Exhibition, Hiroshima Prefectural Museum of Art, Hiroshima, JP
	Artists’ Union Symposium ’79, Tokyo Metropolitan Art Museum, Tokyo, JP
1978	Graphic works by the former Gutai Members, Imabashi Gallery, Osaka, JP
	The 2nd Kanayama Prize Candidates Art Exhibition, Hyogo Prefectural Museum of Art, Kobe, JP
	Nara Artists’ Union Exhibition, Nara Prefectural Cultural Hall, Nara, JP
	Artists’ Union Symposium ’78, Tokyo Metropolitan Art Museum, Tokyo, JP
	Art ’78 Setouchi, Matsuyama, Ehime Prefectural Museum of Art, Matsuyama, JP
1977	The 6th Hyogo Art Fair, Hyogo Prefectural Museum of Art, Kobe, JP
	Ge Exhibition, Prefectural Art Gallery of Osaka, JP
	Artists’ Union Symposium ’77, Tokyo Metropolitan Art Museum, Tokyo, JP
1976	Eighteen Years of Gutai, Osaka Prefectural Gallery, Osaka, JP
	Artists’ Union Symposium ’76, Tokyo Metropolitan Art Museum, Tokyo, JP
	Artists’ Union Symposium ’76, Hokkaido, JP
	JAPAN NOW, San Francisco, CA, US
	2nd Neo Art Exhibition, Himeji Civic Hall, Renga-sha, Doi Gallery, Himeji; Utsumi Gallery, Takasago, JP
	’76 Modern Art Exhibition, Gallery Sanchika, Kobe, JP
	Konnichi no Kuukan ten- Information and Communication, Yokohama Citizen’s Gallery, Yokohama, JP
	Art now, Museum of Modern Art Hyogo, Kobe, JP
1975	Sannin ten : Minoru Onoda, Hachiro Iizuka and Takesada Matsutani, Gallery Doi, Himeji, Hyogo, JP
	Fourth Setouchi Modern Art Exhibition, Okayama General Cultural Center, Okayama, JP
	Art now, Museum of Modern Art Hyogo, Kobe, JP
	The 1st Tokyo Exhibition, Tokyo Metropolitan Art Museum, Tokyo, JP
	The First Neo Art Exhibition, Hakusan Gallery, Kobe, JP
1973	Himeji Representative Artists Exhibition, Gallery Doi, Himeji, JP
1972	Yoshihara Jiro wo kakomu ten, Fujimi Gallery, Osaka, JP
1971	Opening Exhibition of Gutai Mini Pinacotheca, Gutai Mini Pinacotheca, Osaka, JP
1970	Japan Expo ’70, Museum of Fine Arts, Osaka, JP
	The First Hyogo Art Fair, Hyogo Prefectural Art Museum, Kobe, Hyogo, JP
1969	Hiroshima Renaissance Art Exhibition, Hiroshima Prefectural Art Museum, Hiroshima, JP
1968	21st Gutai Exhibition, Gutai Pinacotheca, Osaka, JP
	20th Gutai Exhibition, Gutai Pinacotheca, Osaka, JP
	Contemporary Art Exhibition Only At Night, Miyaszaki Kanko Hotel, Miyazaki, JP
1967	19th Gutai Exhibition, Central Museum, Tokyo, JP
	New Works of Gutai (18th Gutai Exhibition), Gutai Pinacoteca, Osaka, JP
	Gutai, Heide Hildebrand Gallery, Klagenfurt, AT
	Gutai Small Works Exhibition in Holland, Rotterdam Design House, Rotterdam, Netherlands
	Southern Japan Modern Art Exhibition, Kochi, JP
1966	17th Gutai Exhibition, Takashimaya Department Store, Yokohama; Gutai Pinacoteca, Osaka, JP
	Gutai Art Exhibition, International Gallery, Oley, Den Haag, NL
	Gutai Small Work Exhibition, Mickey Art Gallery, Loenersloot, NL
	Pan-Setouchi Modern Art Exhibition, Okayama General Cultural Center, Okayama, JP
	2e Salon international de galerie pilotes, Musée Cantonal des Beaux-Arts, Lausanne, CH
	The new generation of Japanese Art, National Museum of Modern Art, Tokyo, JP
	Seven Contemporary Japanese Artists, Fine Arts Gallery, San Diego State College, San Diego, CA, US ( cat.)
1965	Trends in contemporary Japanese paintings and sculpture, National Museum of Modern Art, Kyoto, JP
	Seven Contemporary Japanese Artists, Art Gallery at California State College at Fullerton, Fullerton, CA, US
	16th Gutai exhibition, The Shinjuku Keio Department Store, Tokyo, JP
	Gendai no Yokubou 100 ten, Tokyo, JP
1964	3rd International Exhibition for Young Artists, Japan and Europe
	The Seibu Department Store SSS Hall, Tokyo, JP
	The First Turner Award Exhibition, Osaka, JP
1960	Warera no Shinjin ten, Kobe City Museum, Kobe, Hyogo, JP
1960 - 1965	Himeji Independents, Himeji, JP
1958 - 1975	12th Niki Group Exhibition (yearly through 1975)

== Permanent installations, museum and public collections ==
Museum Boijmans Van Beuningen, Rotterdam, NL

Hyogo Prefectural Museum of Art, Kobe, JP

Himeji City Gallery, Himeji, JP

Ashiya City Museum of Art and History, Ashiya, JP

The Miyagi Museum of Art, JP

HOLE・CUT・LIGHT, Nissan Corporation, Himeji, JP

Literature monument of Rinzo Shiina, Himeji, JP

Himeji City Hall, Himeji, JP

Himeji Kohryo Junior High School, Himeji, JP

Art Kite Museum, DE

Private collections in Japan, US, UK and Switzerland

== Awards ==
2004	33nd Blue Mer Prize for Art, Kobecco Magazine, Kobe, JP
1984	The 6th Himeji Geijutsu Bunka Taisho (Himeji Cultural Grand Prize for Art)
1976	Handonnokai Bunka Taisho (Handonnokai Cultural Award for Modern Art), Kobe, JP
1968	The 6th Himeji Bunka Taisho (Himeji Cultural Award), Himeji, JP
1964	The First Turner Award Exhibition, Awarded the Turner Grand Prize, JP
1963	The 10th Kansai- Niki-Kai Exhibition (Honorable Mention Award)
	The 17th Niki-Kai Exhibition (Honorable Mention Award)
1962	The 9th Kansai Niki-Kai Exhibition (Sakura Award)
1960	The 7th Kansai Niki-Kai Exhibition (Honorable Mention Award)
	The 14th Niki-Kai Exhibition (Encouragement Award)

== Major catalogues ==
- Anne Mosseri-Marlio Galerie AG - Monograph on 'Minoru Onoda' with 232 pages and over 170 photographs, published by Scheidegger & Spiess, Zurich ISBN 978-3-85881-821-8 (English version) and ISBN 978-3-85881-822-5 (Japanese Version)
- Alexandra Munroe and Ming Tiampo - Gutai: Splendid Playground, published by Guggenheim Museum Publications, New York ISBN 978-0-892-07489-1
- Ming Tiampo - Gutai: Decentering Modernism, published by University of Chicago Press ISBN 0-226-80166-7, 978-0-226-80166-7
- Onoda Minoru no sekai ten : gendai kyōdo sakkaten, Catalog of an exhibition held at Himeji Shiritsu Bijutsukan, Jan. 9-30, 2004
- Art Kites: Pictures for the Sky/Kunstdrachen. Bilder für den Himmel, Haus der Kunst, Munich, 1989
