= Art Gallery of Hamilton =

Art gallery in Hamilton, Ontario, Canada

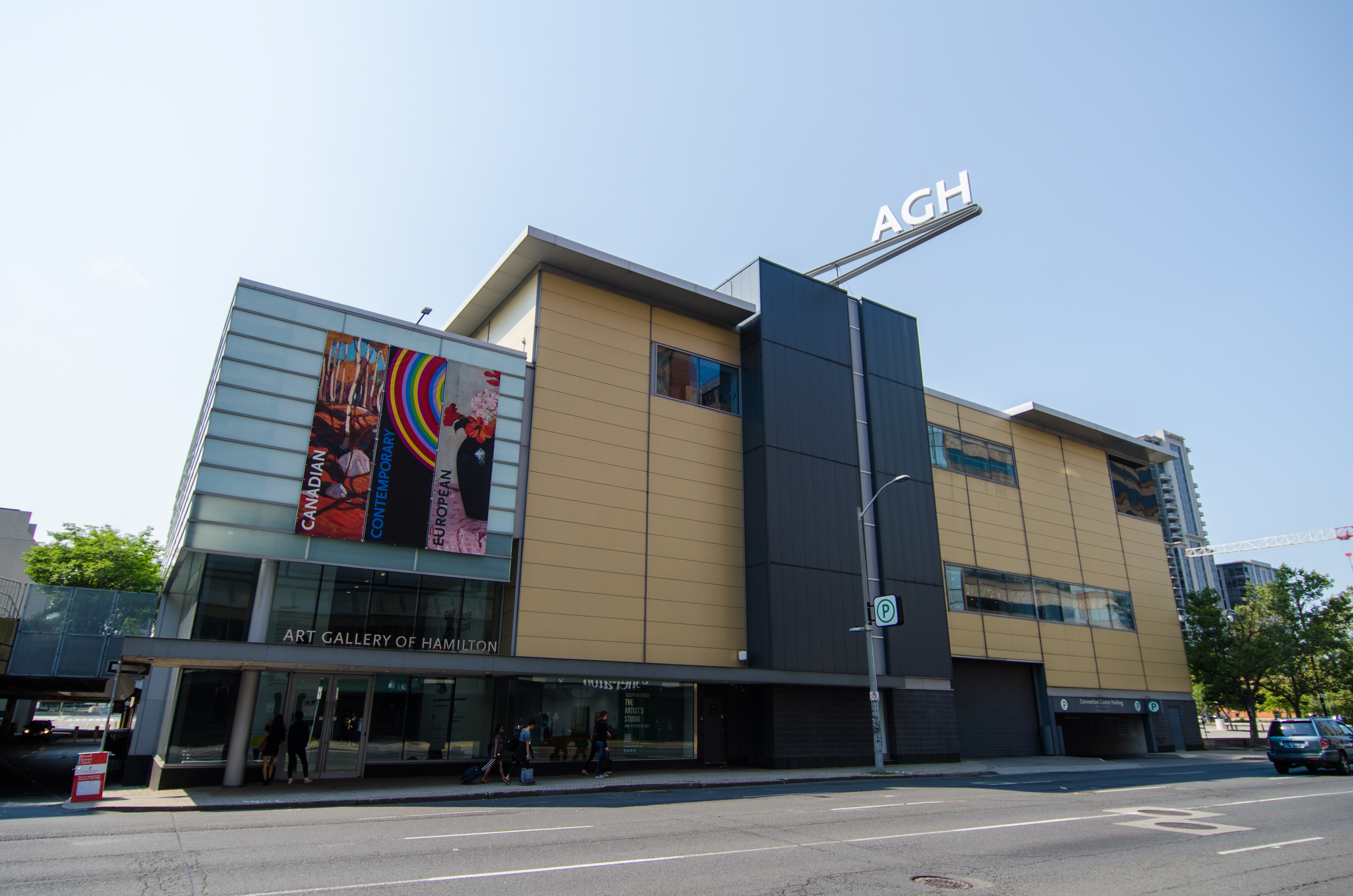
- Art Gallery of Hamilton from King Street West
- Established: 31 January 1914; 112 years ago
- Location: 123 King Street West, Hamilton, Ontario, Canada
- Coordinates: 43.2575°N 79.872222°W
- Type: Art museum
- Director: Shelley Falconer
- Architects: Trevor Garwood-Jones; Bruce Kuwabara (renovations)
- Website: artgalleryofhamilton.com

The Art Gallery of Hamilton (AGH) is an art museum located in Hamilton, Ontario, Canada. The museum occupies a 7,000 square metres (75,000 sq ft) building on King Street West in downtown Hamilton, designed by Trevor P. Garwood-Jones. The institution is southwestern Ontario's largest and oldest art museum.

The museum was established as the Municipal Gallery of Hamilton in January 1914, and was opened to the public in June 1914, at a Hamilton Public Library building on Main Street West. The museum continued to operate from that location until 1953, when the museum relocated to a new building in the neighbourhood of Westdale. In 1977, the museum moved to its present King Street West location. The museum building was renovated with designs by Bruce Kuwabara from 2003 to 2005.

The Art Gallery of Hamilton's permanent collection has over 10,000 works by artists from Canada and around the world. In addition to exhibiting works from its collection, the museum has also organized and hosted a number of travelling exhibitions.

== History ==
The spouse of William Blair Bruce donated a number of works to the City of Hamilton, on the condition that an adequate facility was founded to house them. The museum was formally incorporated by the city on 31 January 1914 as the Municipal Gallery of Hamilton. The museum first operated from the second floor of a Hamilton Public Library branch on Main Street, west of James Street. The museum was opened to the public on 28 June 1914, hosting an exhibition of 33 works by William Blair Bruce.

In 1947, the City raised the budget of the institution significantly to finance the employment of the institution's first curator-director, Thomas Reid MacDonald. MacDonald had sought to grow the institution's collection, as well as refurbish or construct a new museum's building. During this time, MacDonald appointed an auxiliary volunteer group to support the museum, known as the Women’s Volunteer Committee. The Committee helped raise funds for the acquisition of works, as well as funds for a new building. On 12 December 1953 the museum opened a one-storey Art Deco building in the neighbourhood of Westdale, adjacent to McMaster University.

However, by the 1960s, it had become apparent that any expansion of the museum would require relocation, as expansion plans for the adjacent university made any plans to expand the museum difficult. The museum eventually announced its plans to relocate to downtown Hamilton, as a part of the municipal government's larger "Civic Square Project;" which included Hamilton Convention Centre, and Hamilton Place (later renamed FirstOntario Concert Hall). Trevor Garwood-Jones was commissioned to design a new building for the museum, which opened in October 1977.

In 2003, the museum underwent C$18 million renovation of the building. The renovated museum building was reopened in May 2005.

The museum was notified in 2003 that a painting in its permanent collection, Portrait of a Lady, by Johannes Cornelisz Verspronck, was suspected of being art stolen by the Nazis during World War II. After a 10 year investigation into the claim, the museum confirmed the claim in November 2014, and returned the painting to its original owners. The painting was acquired by the museum from a Sotheby's auction for C$58,000 in 1987, with the museum unaware that the work was stolen art.

From July 2012 to February 2018, the museum operated a satellite location, called the AGH Design Annex, on James Street North, as a retail and flexible space for museum programs, such as its film program. The Annex was closed, in part, due to financial restraints, as well as to concentrate the institute's programming efforts on its main location. Following the closure of the AGH Annex, the museum's films were shown at the Lincoln Alexander Centre until the building was purchased by Philpott Memorial Church.

== Architecture ==
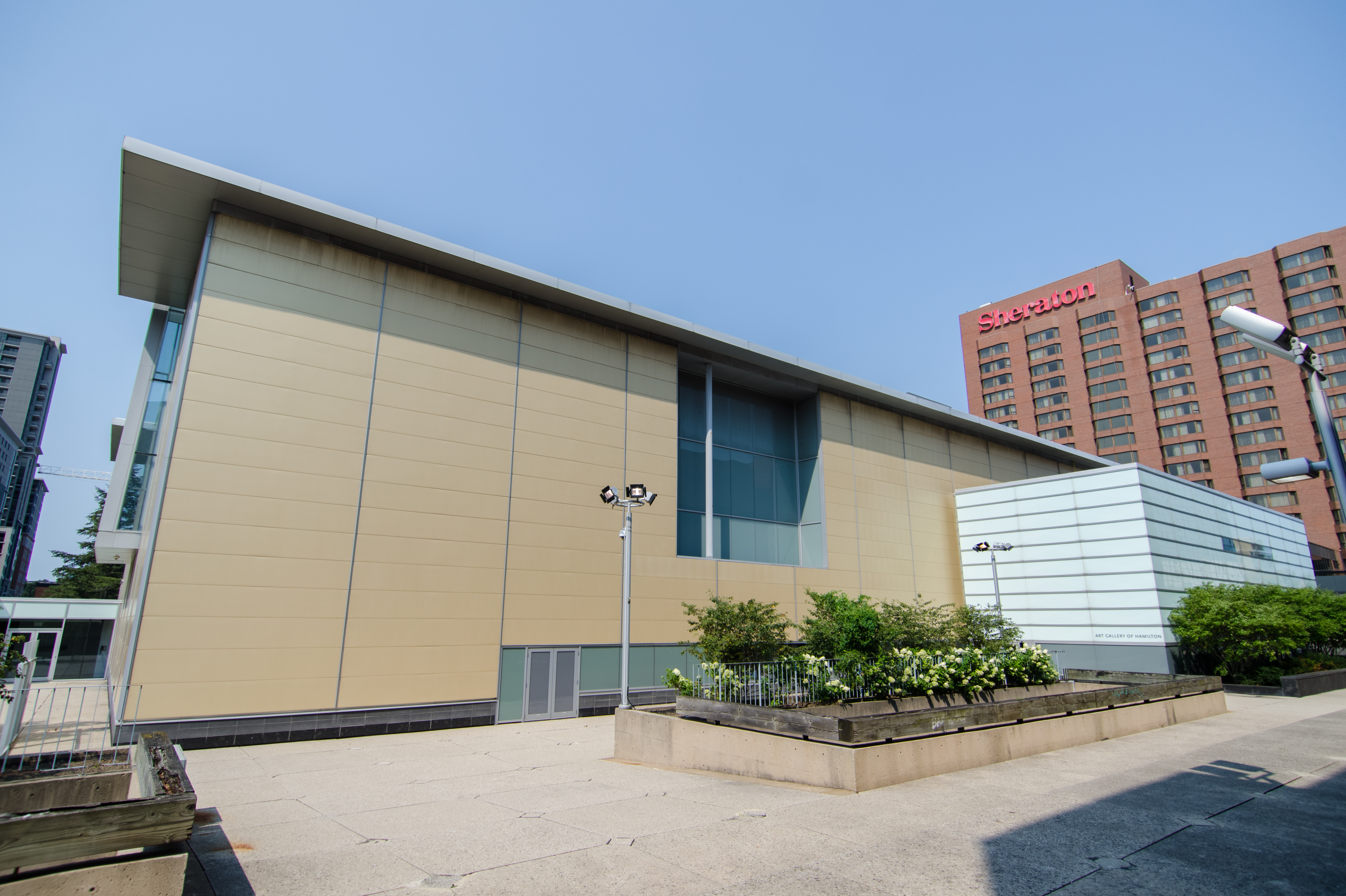
The exterior is covered in gold-steel panels, installed onto the building during the 2003–05 renovations.

The museum is situated on King Street West in downtown Hamilton. The property is owned by the municipal government, with the museum occupying the property under a lease arrangement. The museum occupies a 7,000 square metres (75,000 sq ft) building originally designed by Trevor Garwood-Jones. Garwood-Jones was commissioned to design a building for the museum in 1969, and the museum was later built and opened in 1977. The building design was typical of other brutalist designs found in the city, with exposed concrete and shaped into bunker-like boxes.

Initially the building's main entrance was to be situated on the building's second level, connected through a series of municipally maintained elevated walkways around Commonwealth Square. The elevated walkway plan, known as Plus 15, was never completed, with developments abandoned by the municipal government. However, as a result of abandoning the Plus 15 system, the museum's entrance was placed at a covered street off the main roadways and Commonwealth Square adjacent to the museum was disconnected from the street.

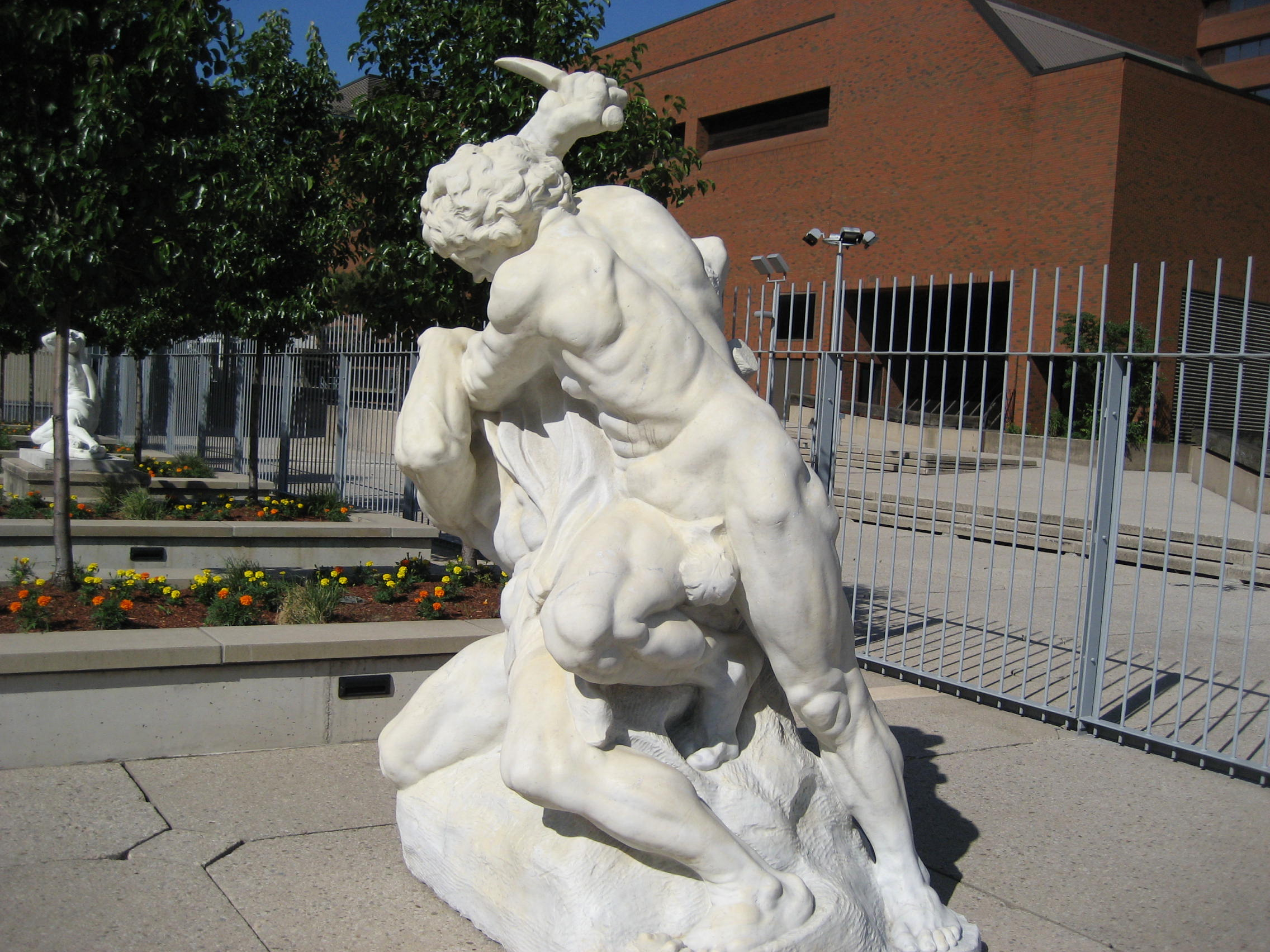
A sculpture on display at the Irving Zucker Sculpture Garden

In 2003, the museum undertook a two-year renovation of the museum building, completed in 2005. The renovations were undertaken by KPMB Architects, with Bruce Kuwabara serving as design partner. PCL Construction was contracted as the renovation's construction manager, whereas Stantec was contracted as the project manager. The renovations saw the installation of insulated gold-steel panels to cover the existing structure, with most of the materials coming from Dofasco. The renovations also saw the construction of a pavilion and Irving Zucker Sculpture Garden to the south of the museum, occupying the space formerly planned for the Plus 15 elevated walkways.

In 2026, the museum received a federal grant of C$950,000 to fund the first phase of a major expansion project. The museum director, Shelley Falconer announced that the renovation will entail a four-storey extension of the museum building, with a new main entrance facing Main Street West, a new gallery space for permanent exhibits, and expanded collection storage.

== Permanent collection ==
As of January 2026, the museum has over 10,000 works in its permanent collection. As of 2018, approximately 12 per cent of all works in the museum's permanent collection were created by female artists. The permanent collection is organized into three collection areas, the Canadian collection, the contemporary art collection, and the international collection.

The museum's Canadian collection area includes works from all Canadian artists, including Indigenous artists from the region; although it does not include contemporary Canadian artists, whose works are organized into the contemporary collection area. In 2016, the museum received a donation of 75 Inuit sculptures, crafted by Inuit patients of the Hamilton Mountain Sanatorium as a part of their therapy. The contemporary collection includes all contemporary artists, regardless of nationality or geographic origin. The international collection includes works from non-Canadian artists, notably European artists from the Baroque to Post-Impressionism period, with particular emphasis on the French, British and Italian schools. A number of the works in the international collection were donated by Joey and Toby Tanenbaum, including 200 European works in 2002 and their entire African collection in 2010.

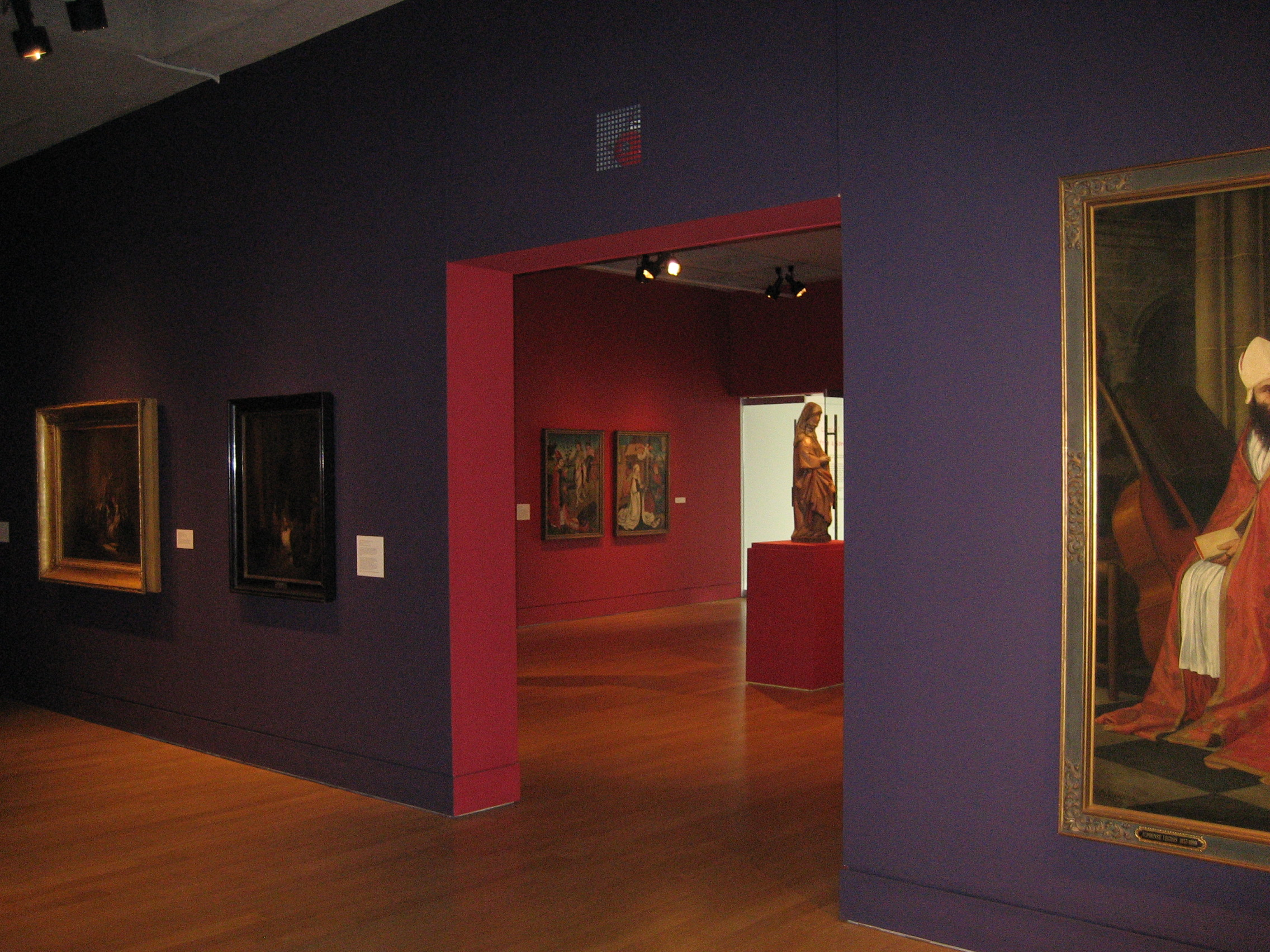
Works from the museum's international collection area on exhibit

The museum's permanent collection originates from the a number of works by William Blair Bruce, bequeathed to the City of Hamilton in 1914. From 1929 to 1947, the museum's permanent collection saw little growth, given unsafe storage conditions and lack of patrons willing to contribute to the institution. In 1947, the raised the budget of the institution significantly, allowing for the employment of a curator and conservation staff for the collection.

Efforts to revitalize the collection were undertaken in the mid-20th century by the museum's first curator-director, Thomas Reid MacDonald. Acquisition efforts were also bolstered by the fundraising efforts of the museum's Women's Volunteer Committee. MacDonald held an annual winter exhibition from 1948 to 1973, which provided artists with an important exhibition venue and also brought works to Hamilton that might be acquired by the museum. Typically around one hundred works were featured in each exhibition. A jury of local, regional, and national artists of reputation would select one of the exhibited works to win the purchase prize, adding that work to the AGH permanent collection. In this way, many important works were acquired, such as A.J. Casson's First Snow, Lilias Torrance Newton's Keith MacIver, and the iconic Horse and Train by Alex Colville.

One of the works selected from the winter exhibition, Colville's Horse and Train, was panned by The Hamilton Spectator art critic Mary Mason, who wrote: "There are undoubtedly some very fine paintings out at the Art Gallery of Hamilton in this year's Winter Show, but the winner of the purchase prize is not, alas, one of them." The painting would become one of the more popular works in the museum's collection, having been featured on several items in contemporary culture. Shortly after Colville's death, the painting was exhibited alongside two study drawings that help demonstrate the geometrical plotting in the work. In addition to the study drawings, the work was also accompanied by a letter from Colville thanking the museum's director for purchasing the work and a display of books that the work was featured in.

=== Selected works ===
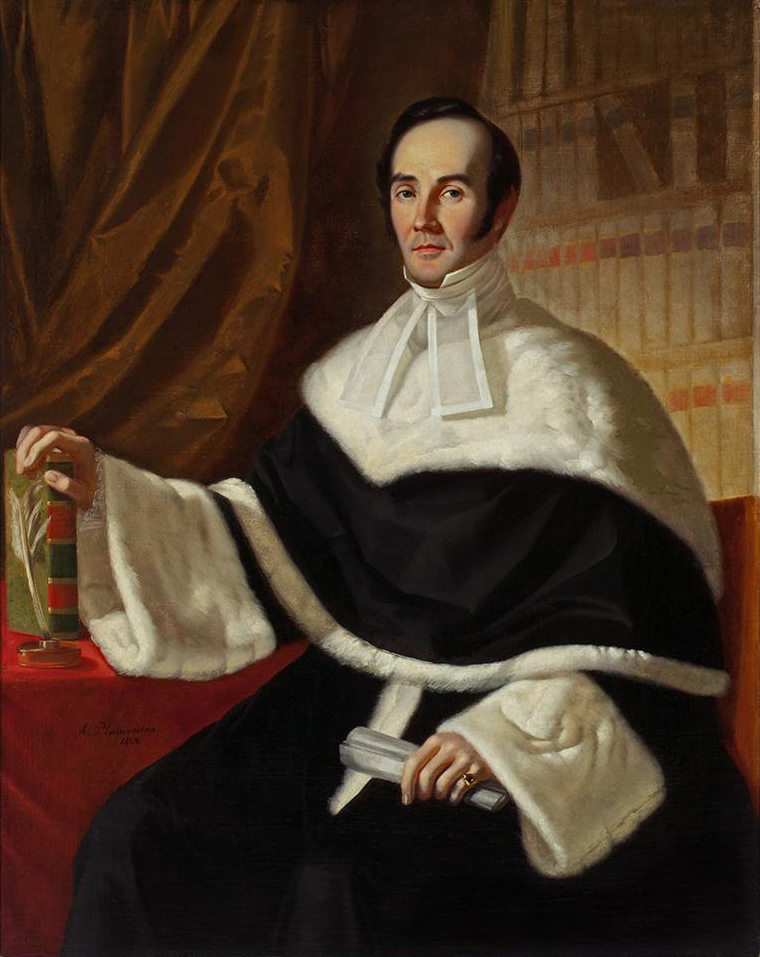
Antoine Plamondon, Portrait of Elzéar Bédard, 1842

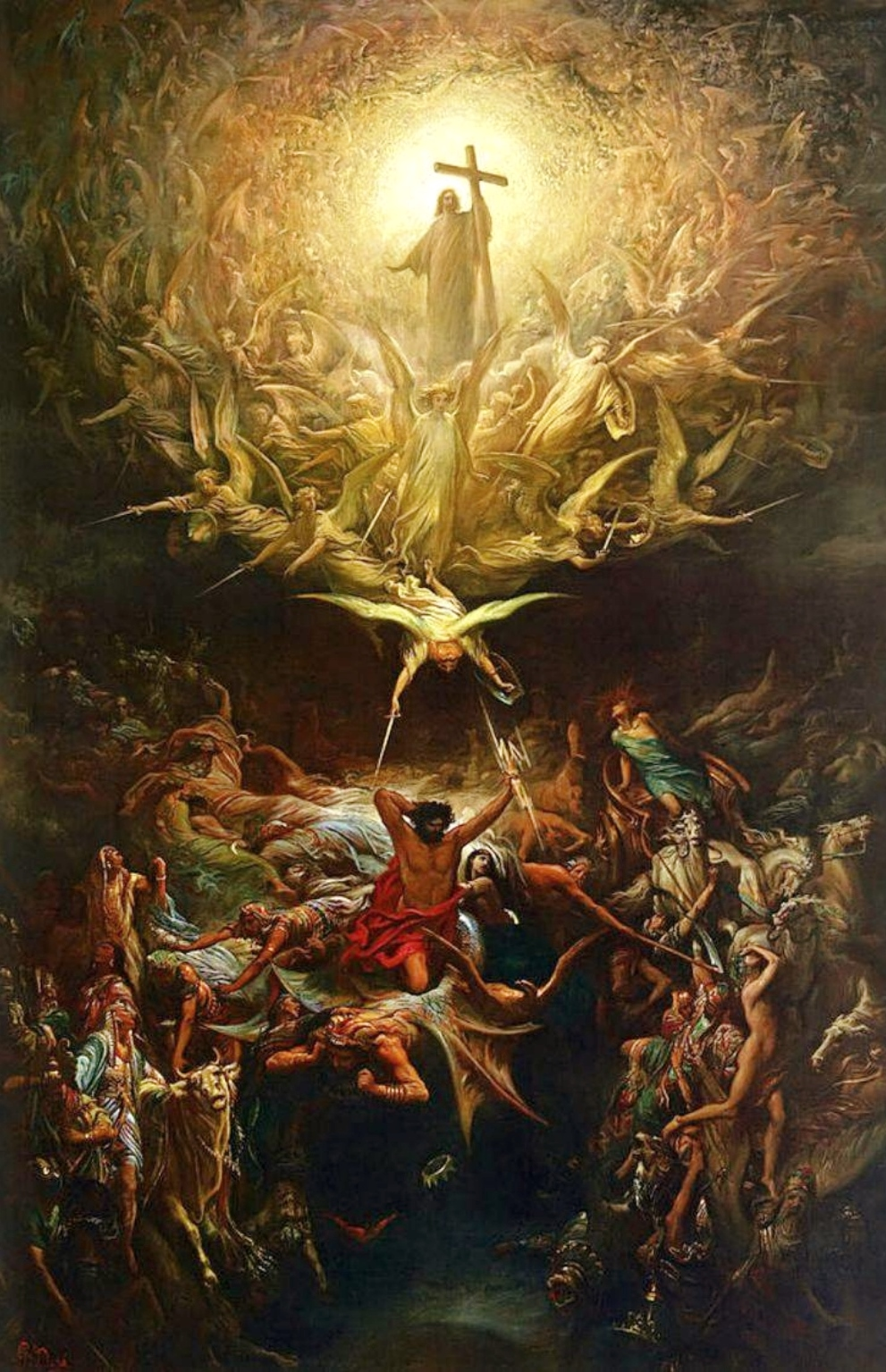
Gustave Doré, The Triumph Of Christianity Over Paganism, 1868

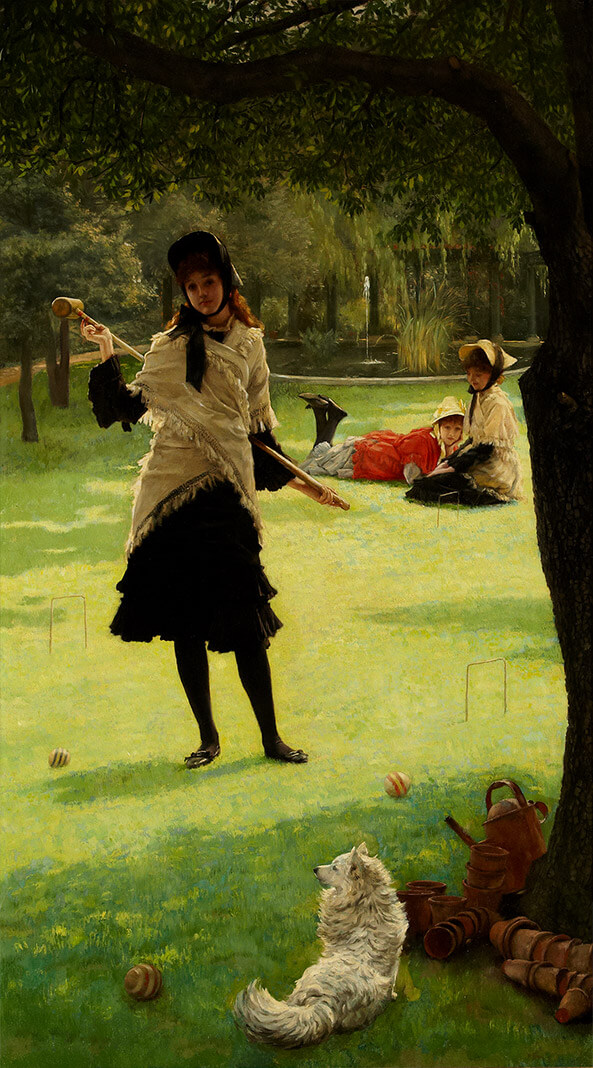
James Tissot, Croquet, 1878

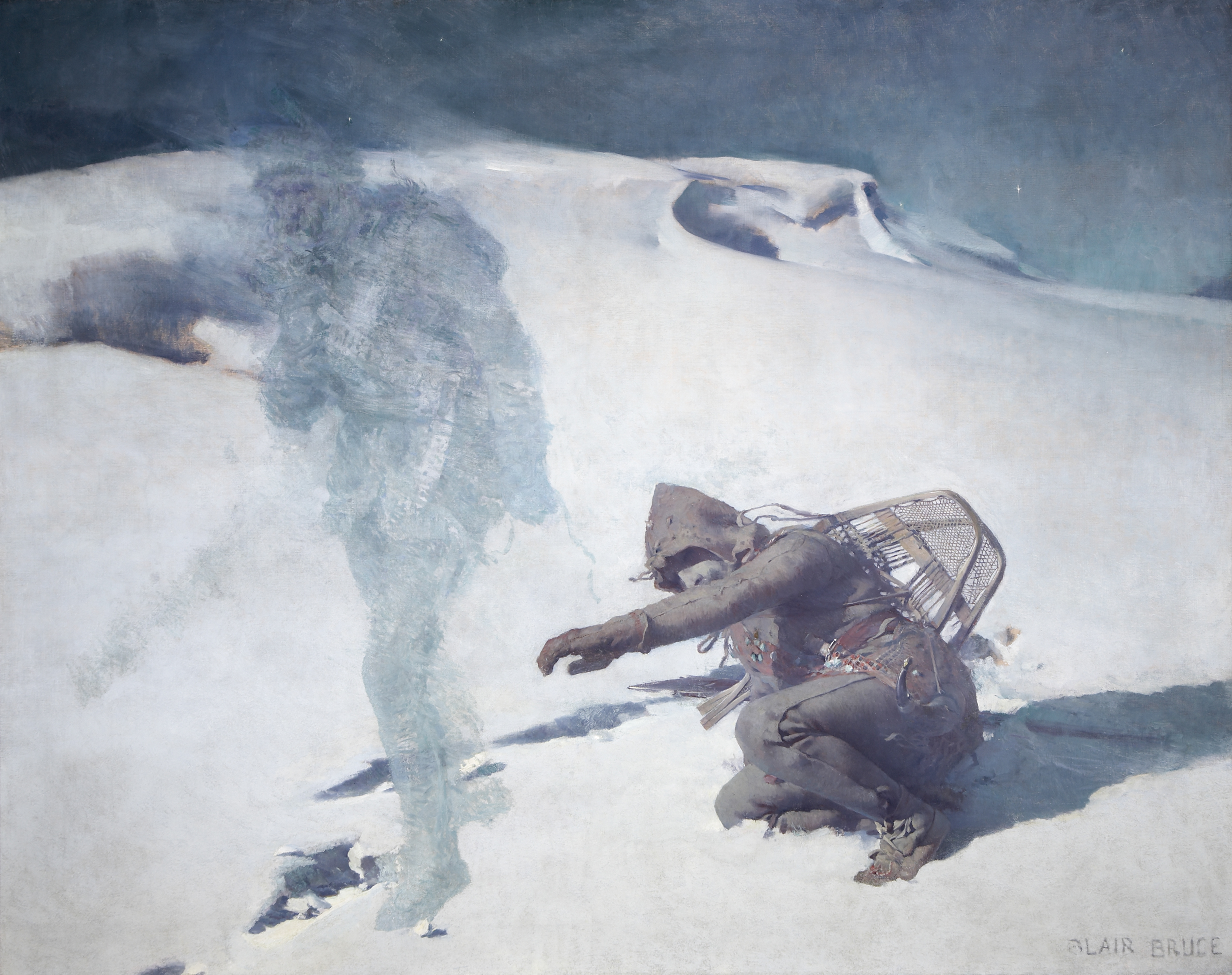
William Blair Bruce, The Phantom Hunter, 1888

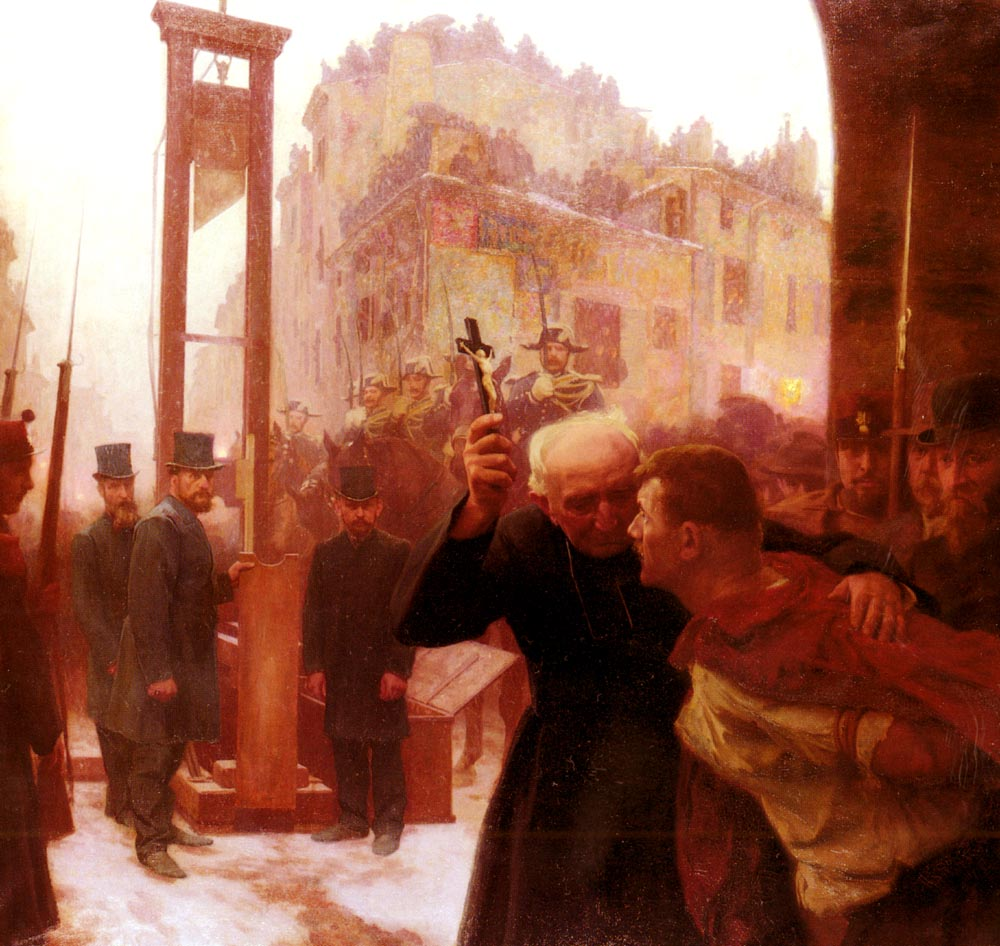
Émile Friant, Capital Punishment, 1908

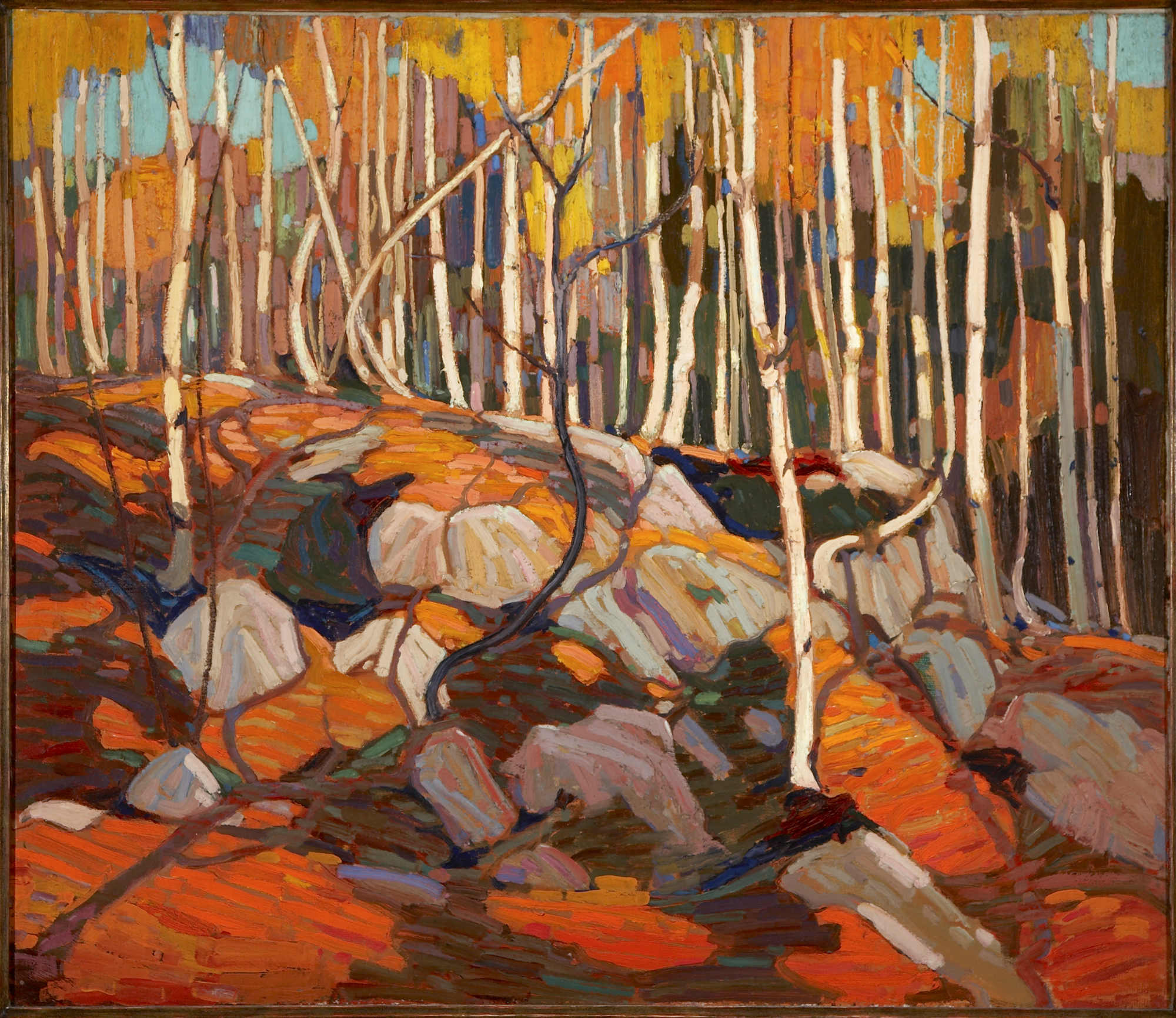
Tom Thomson, The Birch Grove, Autumn, Winter 1915-16

== Library ==
The museum also operates a reference library, the Muriel Bostwick Library. The library's holdings include documents that support the permanent collection, as well as past catalogues and exhibition documents published by the museum.

== See also ==
- Culture of Hamilton, Ontario
- List of art museums
- List of attractions in Hamilton, Ontario
- List of museums in Ontario
