= To Prince Edward Island =

1965 painting by Alex Colville

- Artist: Alex Colville
- Year: 1965
- Medium: Acrylic on Masonite
- Dimensions: 61.9 cm × 92.5 cm (24.4 in × 36.4 in)
- Location: National Gallery of Canada; Ottawa

To Prince Edward Island is a 1965 acrylic on Masonite painting by Alex Colville. One of his most well-known paintings, it is held at the National Gallery of Canada in Ottawa.

To Prince Edward Island was showcased in November 1965 at the fine arts exhibit at the Atlantic Winter Fair in Halifax, Nova Scotia, while he was living in Sackville, New Brunswick. At the time, the painting was listed for CA$6,000 (equivalent to CA$58,643 in 2025). It won first place in the fair's "media other than oil, watercolor or pastel" category.

== Description ==
To Prince Edward Island depicts a woman on the top deck of a ferry crossing the Northumberland Strait between the Canadian provinces of New Brunswick and Prince Edward Island. The woman (Colville's wife Rhoda Wright) is facing directly towards the viewer, looking through a pair of binoculars. A man, whose face is covered by her, is sitting behind her.

=== Background ===
The painting is set on the original MV Abegweit, a passenger ferry which crossed the Abegweit Passage in the Northumberland Strait from 1947 to 1982, connecting New Brunswick and Prince Edward Island through Port Borden and Cape Tormentine. The Abegweit was then succeeded by a larger vessel of the same name until the completion of the Confederation Bridge connected the two provinces in 1997.

During an interview with Colville when he was living in Wolfville, Nova Scotia, he explained that he had come up with the idea for the painting from when he and his wife were in Charlottetown, adding that he "had actually done various [drawings] over the years of a woman looking through binoculars and a man kind of lounging at her side," and "the ferry seemed the perfect setting for it".

== Influence and legacy ==
To Prince Edward Island has been attributed as being one of Colville's most well-known artworks. It was purchased by and is held by the National Gallery of Canada in Ottawa, and influenced American filmmaker Wes Anderson, who restaged it in a scene of his 2012 film Moonrise Kingdom. The painting is also referenced in the 2017 photographic-video work Long View by Korean-Canadian artist Jin-me Yoon, specifically in Long View 1, a photograph in which Yoon is looking out through binoculars.
