= Yves Gaucher =

Canadian artist (1934–2000)

- Born: January 3, 1934; Montreal, Quebec, Canada
- Died: September 8, 2000 (aged 66); Montreal, Quebec, Canada
- Education: École des Beaux-Arts in Montreal
- Known for: Painter, graphic artist
- Spouse: Germaine Chaussé
- Awards: Order of Canada, 1981

Yves Gaucher, CM (January 3, 1934 – September 8, 2000) was an abstract painter and printmaker. He is considered a leader amongst Quebec's printmakers in the 1950s and 60s. His work has been included in the collections of public galleries such as the National Gallery of Canada in Ottawa, the Museum of Modern Art in New York City, and the Victoria and Albert Museum in London.

== Early life and education ==
Yves Gaucher was born on January 3, 1934, in Montreal to Tancrède Gaucher, a pharmacist and optician, and Laura Élie Gaucher, as the sixth of eight children. He attended the Collège Brébeuf in Montreal in 1948, but was expelled for drawing immoral pictures. These pictures were in fact copied from his textbooks on Ancient Greek and Egyptian art. A year after his expulsion he switched to an English-language Protestant school, Sir George Williams College and it was there that he took his first art course.

Music was very important to Gaucher. Raised in a musical home, where everyone played an instrument, Gaucher took up the trumpet at age twelve. His first full-time job was with the CBC, where he started in the mailroom. His ambition, however, was to become a radio announcer with his own jazz program. In the meantime he played gigs at night, and also organized a few jam sessions in 1955–56 at Galerie L'Actuelle, founded by Guido Molinari.

After the CBC he then went on to become an employee of the Canadian Pacific Steamship Line, working in its Montreal and Halifax offices.

After meeting Arthur Lismer, a Group of Seven artist, Gaucher decided to study art seriously. He enrolled at the École des Beaux-Arts in Montreal in 1954, but was expelled in 1956 for taking only the courses in which he was interested. After his expulsion, he continued to study art on his own, while earning an income through various jobs. Gaucher then returned to the École to study printmaking with Albert Dumouchel, where he created a controversial technique of heavy embossing. When met with criticism, he described his technique as a way of challenging the traditional "taboos".

== Art career ==
=== Early printmaking success ===
Gaucher's art career began when he set up an exhibition at the Galerie d'Échange in Montreal in 1957. He enjoyed success afterwards, and as a result became the founding president of Associations des Peintures-Gravures de Montreal in 1960. From 1960 to 1964 Gaucher focused solely on printmaking. His teacher was master printmaker Albert Dumouchel (1916–1971).

In 1962, Gaucher travelled to Europe on a grant from the Canada Council. There, in Paris, he encountered the music of Anton Webern, which became a major influence on him. In his artworks, he began to incorporate more irregular geometries as opposed to strictly geometric forms, as well as greater contrasts of colour. This, he felt, would better represent the atonality of Webern's music.

Gaucher's prints of the late 1950s and early 1960s were technically innovative and demonstrated extensive experimentation with relief and lamination, and have been described as delighting in "material physicality." He garnered national and international attention, and won prizes at major print shows in Canada, Ljubljana, Yugoslavia, and Grenchen, Switzerland.

In 1968, Gaucher was considered to be the leader of printmaking in Quebec, and he taught a printmaking class at Sir George Williams University (now Concordia University). This class was attended by Montreal artist Betty Goodwin. Learning from Gaucher was pivotal to Goodwin's later success in the realm of printmaking. About Goodwin, Gaucher said: “I gave her everything I could because she was the most worthy student that I had. And looking back on it she was the most worthy student I have ever had…. It’s not just the work. It’s in the attitude, the commitment, the discipline and in the earnestness if you will.”

=== Modernism ===
By 1964, however, Gaucher began to focus on painting instead of printmaking. A major influence in his early paintings were artists such as Barnett Newman and Mark Rothko, who were New York Abstract Expressionists. This led him to create similar works which emulated the structure of modernist art. Some of the characteristics of the artwork he produced in this period include the use of regular geometric objects and flat panels of colour on unusually large canvases. He also created art using mathematical relationships, including symmetry, patterning, and spatial relationships, which eventually led to monochromatic works.

In 1966, works by Gaucher along with those of Alex Colville and Sorel Etrog represented Canada at the Venice Biennale. From 1967 to 1969, Gaucher created a series of Grey on Grey paintings. These works, amongst his most important, were meant to be interpreted in two different ways. As individual paintings, they would be seen based on their linear movement; as a whole, they were an environment, based on colour.

Gaucher was crucial in the development of the colour band style of art, which was first created in 1970. This form of painting consists of wide stripes of uniform colours. Gaucher also extended colour band painting to include works of horizontal planes of contrasting colour. Gaucher's interest in mathematical art persisted, as he created works based on chaos theory and the diagonal line.

In 1980, Gaucher received the Order of Canada, and was named a member in 1981. In this period he taught at Concordia University in Montreal, where among his pupils was Joan Rankin. However, a shoulder injury and other health problems would force him to paint on smaller surfaces, and he returned to creating collages, one of his earlier practices.

He was an associate member of the Royal Canadian Academy of Arts

He died in Montreal on September 8, 2000.

== Personal life ==
In 1964, he married Germaine Chaussé. They had two sons; Benoit Gaucher was born in 1968, and Denis Gaucher in 1970.

== Works ==
An incomplete list of works by Gaucher:

=== Prints ===
- Untitled (1958)
- Espace linéaire No. 1 (1958)
- La Tête No. 2 (1958)
- Untitled (1959)
- 143° (1960)
- Sotoba (1961)
- Asagao (1961)
- Naka (1962)
- Lux (1962)
- Sgana (1962)
- Houda (1963)
- Sono (1963)
- En hommage à Webern (1963) (series)
- Fugue Jaune (1963)
- Transitions (1966) (series)
- Jericho (1978)
- Fente (1986)
- Signal (1991)
- Pauses (1993)
- En pièces détachées (1996) (series)

=== Paintings ===
- Conclusion 230 (1960)
- Square Dances (1964) (series)
- Point-contrepoint (1965)
- Signals/Silences (1965) (series)
- Ragas (1966) (series)
- Alap (1967)
- Grey on Grey (1967–69) (series)
- R-69 (1970)
- Champ vert (1971)
- Colour bands (1971–75) (series)
- Orange-jaune (1977)
- Jericho: An Allusion to Barnet Newman (1978) (series)
- Inversions 1 and 2 (1980)
- Phase I, II, and III (1981)
- New Works on Paper (1986) (series)
- Dark Paintings (1986) (series)
- Trinome (1996) (series)
- Red, Blue, and Yellow (1998)

== Legacy ==
Roald Nasgaard among Canadian art historians has continued to write and lecture about Yves Gaucher.

== Record sale prices ==
Cowley-Abbott records in Select Masterworks of Canadian and International Art Highlights that on May 28th 2025, Yves Gaucher's Ocres, jaune et vert, 1974, oil on canvas, signed, titled "Ochres [sic], jaune et vert" and dated "January 1974" on the reverse; unframed 80 x 100 in ( 203.2 x 254 cm ), Auction Estimate: $40,000.00 - $50,000.00, realized a price of $120,000.00.
