= Alex Colville =

Canadian artist (1920–2013)

The Honourable David Alexander Colville PC CC ONS
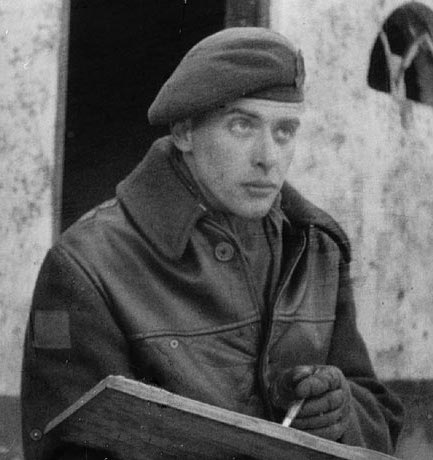
- Alex Colville in 1945
- Born: David Alexander Colville; August 24, 1920; Toronto, Ontario, Canada
- Died: July 16, 2013 (aged 92); Wolfville, Nova Scotia, Canada
- Education: Mount Allison University
- Known for: Painter
- Notable work: Horse and Train (1954); To Prince Edward Island (1965)
- Spouse: Rhoda Wright (m. 1942; died 2012)
- Children: Graham Alexander Colville (1944-); John Harrower Colville (1946–2012); Ann Christian Colville (1949-); Charles Wright Colville (1949-)
- Awards: Companion of the Order of Canada (1982); Governor General's Awards in Visual and Media Arts (2003)

David Alexander Colville PC CC ONS (August 24, 1920 – July 16, 2013) was a Canadian painter and printmaker.

== Early life and war artist ==
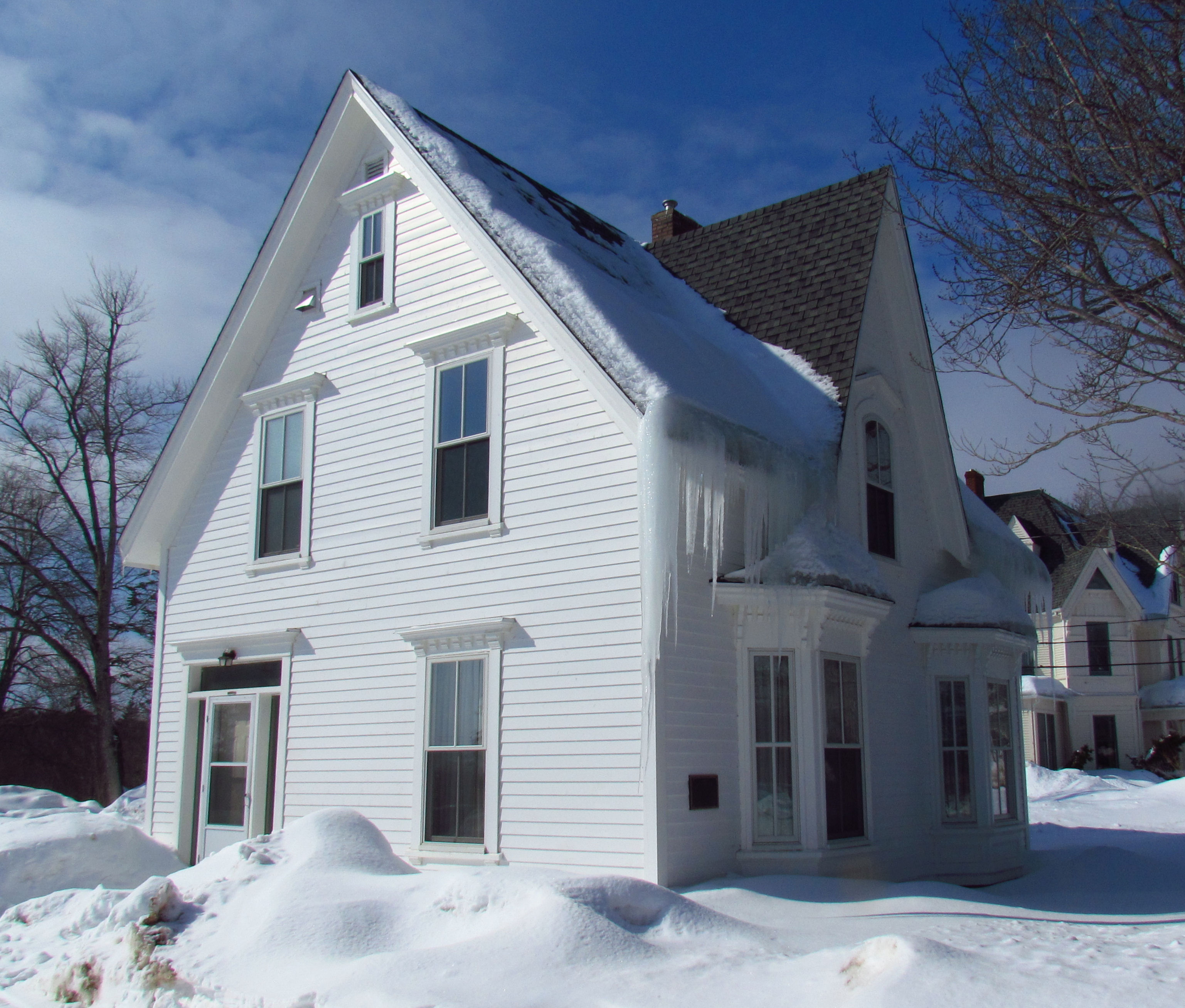
Colville House, Mount Allison University

David Alexander Colville was born on August 24, 1920 in Toronto, Ontario, the second son of Scottish immigrant David Harrower Colville and his wife Florence Gault. He moved with his family at age seven to St. Catharines, and then to Amherst, Nova Scotia, in 1929. He attended Mount Allison University from 1938 to 1942, where he studied with Canadian Post-Impressionists like Stanley Royle and Sarah Hart, graduating with a Bachelor of Fine Arts.

Colville married Rhoda Wright, who he had been friends with since his first year at "Mount A", in 1942 and enlisted in the Canadian Army shortly afterwards. He enlisted in the infantry, eventually earning the rank of lieutenant. He painted in Yorkshire and took part in the Royal Canadian Navy's landings in southern France. He was then attached to the 3rd Canadian Division. After being in the army for two years, and because he was a fine-arts student, he was made an Official Second World War artist in May 1944. His unit relieved the 82nd Airborne Division at Nijmegen, Netherlands, in mid-September 1944 during Operation Market Garden and remained there until the following February. He continued on to tours in the Netherlands and Germany, where he was also tasked with depicting the horrors of the Bergen-Belsen concentration camp. Colville's painting Bodies in a Grave (1946), a scene of emaciated corpses in a Bergen-Belsen burial pit, is based on images he captured with his army-issue camera at the concentration camp.

== Career ==
Colville had some success while still enrolled at Mount Allison, exhibiting at the Art Association of Montreal (now the Montreal Museum of Fine Arts) in 1941, and the Royal Canadian Academy of Arts in 1942. After the war, Colville returned to New Brunswick and became a faculty member with the Fine Arts Department at Mount Allison University, where he taught from 1946 to 1963. Colville is often cited as belonging to the Magic Realism movement, and within this he developed his own style that influenced both a regional and national art community, as teacher and founder of what would become known as Maritime Realism. By contrast to other members of the Maritime school, the composition of his work involved geometry. Often too, in his later work, he seized on the fugitive moment, imagining a hypothetical "What if" something happened in the conscious world.

Maritime Realism came to fruition during the apex of abstract painting's ascendancy both nationally and internationally. Colville influenced a host of students that pursued a realist painting style. Norman Eastman (class of 1952), Hugh Mackenzie (class of 1953), Tom Forrestall (class of 1958), Christopher Pratt (class of 1961) Mary Pratt (class of 1961), Daniel Brown (class of 1961), Nancy Stevens (class of 1962), Ken Tomlie (class of 1962), Roger Savage (class of 1963), Suzanne Hill (class of 1964), Glenn Adams (class of 1965), and Don Pentz (class of 1966).

He left teaching to devote himself to painting and print-making full-time from a studio in his home in Sackville on York Street; this building is now named Colville House. The house was donated to Mount Allison by the Colville family. It now serves as a museum and gallery dedicated to Alex Colville's life and work under the auspice of the Owens Art Gallery.

Colville often used his immediate surroundings as subject matter, using his family as models. Throughout his career, his wife Rhoda Colville, who was also an artist and poet, served as a model for a number of his celebrated works. Rhoda Colville's recreational life as a swimmer, skater, dancer, singer, pianist and cyclist was featured in her husband's pieces, often set in the landscapes and waterways of Annapolis Valley.

In 1966, works by Colville along with those of Yves Gaucher and Sorel Etrog represented Canada at the Venice Biennale. In 1967, Colville was made an Officer of the Order of Canada, elevated to Companion in 1982, the order's highest level. In 1973, the University of Windsor gave him an honorary doctor of laws.

Colville lived in St. Catharines, Ontario, for three years before moving to Nova Scotia. In 1973, he moved his family to his wife's hometown of Wolfville, where they lived and worked in the house that her father built and in which she was born.

In contrast to many of his contemporaries, Colville aligned himself with the Progressive Conservative Party of Canada and was a card-carrying party member for many years. In 1981 he was appointed chancellor of Nova Scotia's Acadia University serving in that role until 1991. In 1997, he received an honorary degree at the Nova Scotia College of Art and Design.

== Personal life and death ==
Colville and his wife, Rhoda Wright, had one daughter and three sons, one of whom predeceased them in 2012. They additionally had eight grandchildren and two great-grandchildren. Wright died on December 29, 2012, after succumbing to dementia.

Colville died on July 16, 2013 at his house in Wolfville at the age of 92, after suffering from a heart condition. His funeral was held on July 24 at Acadia University's Manning Memorial Chapel.

== Exhibitions ==
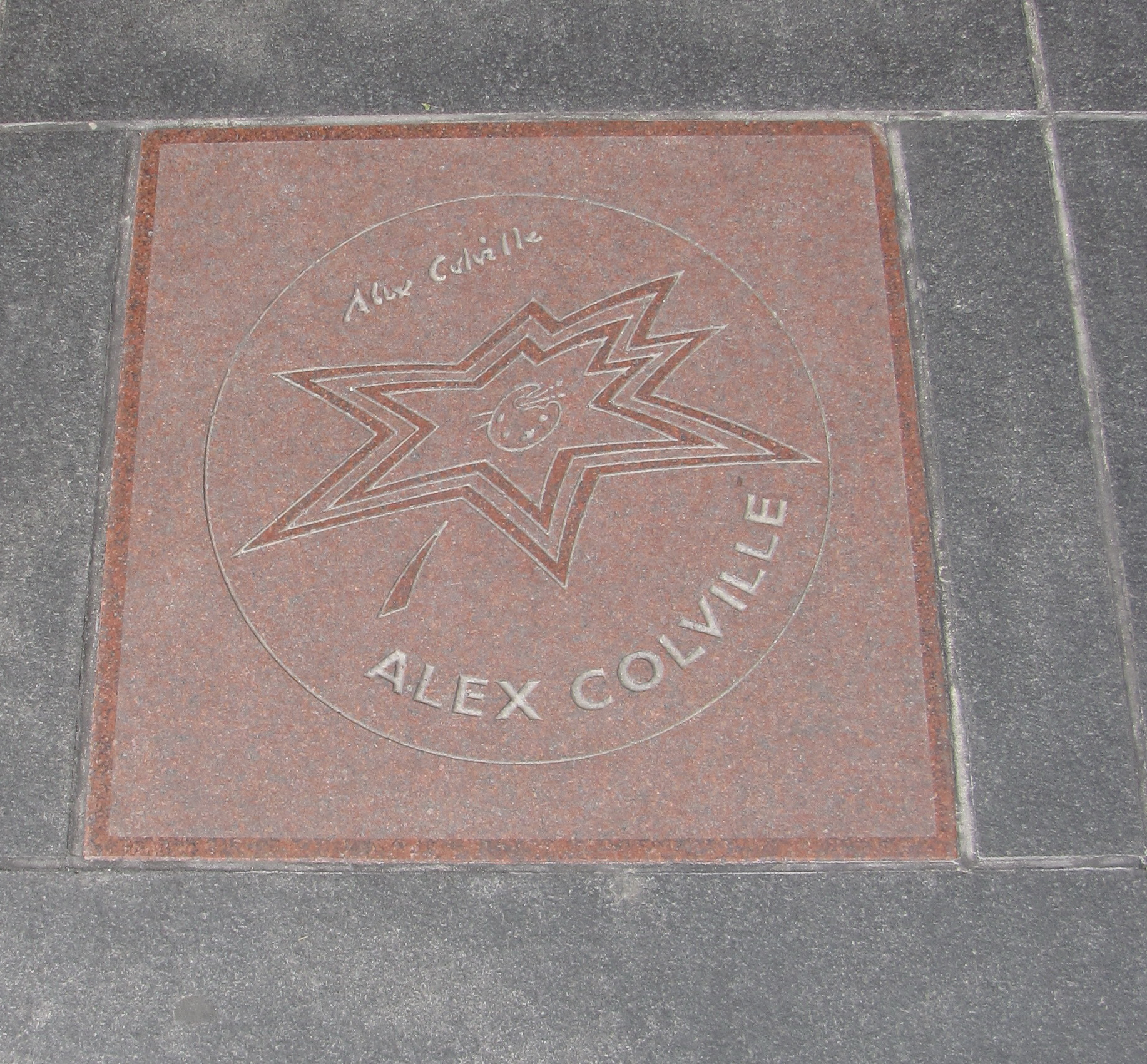
Alex Colville Star on Canada's Walk of Fame

Colville exhibited extensively across Canada and internationally including at the Tate Gallery in London and the Beijing Exhibition Centre in Beijing. In 1983, an international touring retrospective of his work was organized by the Art Gallery of Ontario (AGO). In 2003, The Art Gallery of Nova Scotia organized an exhibition titled Alex Colville: Return curated by Tom Smart. Upon his death in 2013, the AGO was in the process of mounting Alex Colville, the largest exhibition of the artist's work to date which opened in 2014.

Alex Colville's work is found in many collections including the Owens Art Gallery at Mount Allison University. The Owens also maintains Colville House, the private home of Colville which acts as an exhibit space for his work. Colville's work can also be found in the Art Gallery of Nova Scotia, the Cape Breton University Art Gallery in Sydney, Nova Scotia, the New Brunswick Museum, Saint John, the Museum of Modern Art in New York, the Musée National d'Art Moderne in Paris, the National Gallery of Canada in Ottawa, the Centre National d'Art et de Culture Georges Pompidou in Paris, the Wallraf-Richartz Museum in Cologne and the Kestnergesellschaft in Hanover, Germany.

== Notable works ==
=== Infantry, near Nijmegen, Holland ===
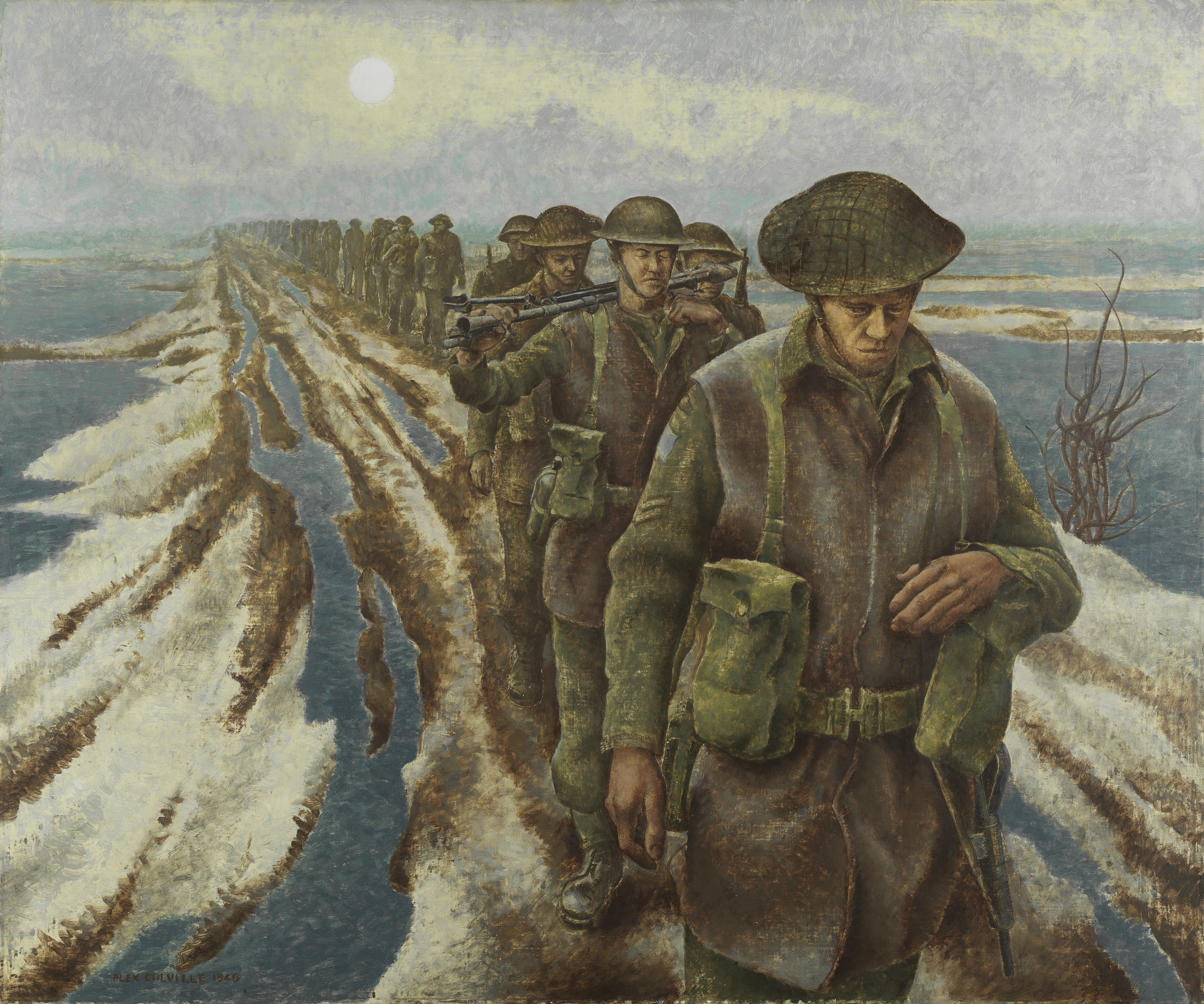
Infantry, near Nijmegen, Holland

Trained as an infantry officer, he did a painting when World War II ended. Based upon numerous drawings, it was called Infantry and is now in the Canadian War Museum. It represents a platoon of Canadian soldiers spread out and marching along both sides of a road. Colville believed it conveyed his perception of war, as both heroism and enduring persistence among nature's elements and constant danger. The face of the first man is actually a portrait of the artist's father.

=== Horse and Train ===
This 1954 work was inspired by two lines from the poet Roy Campbell:

Against a regiment I oppose a brain
And a dark horse against an armored train.

Horse and Train is a part of the Art Gallery of Hamilton's permanent collection; Dominion Foundries and Steel, Ltd. (Dofasco Inc) donated the painting in 1957. It appears on the cover of the album Night Vision by Bruce Cockburn. Alex Colville and Horse and Train are mentioned in the introduction (and in the story itself) of Nova Scotia fiction writer Barry Wood's short story Nowhere to Go published in England's Postscripts #14 in 2008. The painting can also be seen in the film The Shining (1980), hanging in a hallway during the doctor's visit.

=== To Prince Edward Island ===
This 1965 painting is perhaps his best-known work. It features a woman depicted looking through binoculars, in the direction of the artist. Colville describes this work as an exploration of "the searching vision of the female" contrasted with the "stupid and passive" man, who she occludes. "The woman sees, I suppose, and the man does not." To Prince Edward Island is referenced in Korean Canadian artist Jin-me Yoon's series Long View (2017), specifically in the photograph Long View, #1, in which Yoon looks through a pair of binoculars.

=== The Circuit Rider ===
His mural in Tweedie Hall at Mount Allison University, known officially as The History of Mount Allison or The Circuit Rider.

=== Pacific ===
His 1967 painting Pacific, depicts a man leaning against an open door looking out to sea while a Browning Hi-Power pistol rests on a weathered sewing table in the foreground. It inspired one of the definitive scenes in the 1995 film Heat with actor Robert De Niro.

=== Man on Verandah ===
Painted in 1953, its sale at auction for $1.287 million set a record for a work by a living Canadian artist. Part of the estate of the late G. Hamilton Southam (1918–2008), it was sold at an auction of Canadian post-war and contemporary art by Heffel Fine Art Auction House on 25 November 2010. Expected to get up to $600,000, the price inflated during a three-way bidding war between two Canadian phone bidders and a person at the auction.

== List of selected works ==
| Name | Year | Current Location |
|---|---|---|
| Infantry, near Nijmegen, Holland | 1946 | Canadian War Museum, Ottawa, Ontario, Canada |
| The History of Mount Allison (The Circuit Rider) | 1948 | Mount Allison University, Sackville, New Brunswick, Canada |
| Nude and Dummy | 1950 | New Brunswick Museum, St John, New Brunswick, Canada |
| Man on Verandah | 1953 | Private collection, Germany |
| Horse and Train | 1954 | Art Gallery of Hamilton, Hamilton, Ontario, Canada |
| Family and Rainstorm | 1955 | Museum of Modern Art, New York City, New York, US |
| Couple on Beach | 1957 | National Gallery of Canada, Ottawa, Ontario, Canada |
| Ocean Limited | 1962 | Art Gallery of Nova Scotia, Halifax, Nova Scotia, Canada |
| Skater | 1964 | Museum of Modern Art, New York City, New York, US |
| To Prince Edward Island | 1965 | National Gallery of Canada, Ottawa, Ontario, Canada |
| Pacific | 1967 | Private collection, Canada |
| Dog and Bridge | 1976 | Private collection, Canada; sold in 2020 for $2.4 million |
| In the Woods | 1976 | Private collection, Canada |
| Dog and Priest | 1978 | Private collection, Canada |
| Target Pistol and Man | 1980 | Private collection, Canada |
| Cyclist and Crow | 1981 | Montreal Museum of Fine Arts, Montreal, Quebec, Canada |
| Black Cat | 1996 | Mount Allison University, Sackville, New Brunswick, Canada |
| Waterville | 2003 | Private collection, Canada |

== Works in other media ==
In 1965, Colville was commissioned to design the images on the Canadian 1867–1967 centennial commemorative coin set. The set consists of the following designs: Rock dove on 1 cent coin, rabbit on 5 cent coin, mackerel on 10 cent coin, lynx on 25 cent coin, wolf on 50 cent coin and goose on the 1 dollar coin.

On 22 March 2002 Canada Post issued 'Church and Horse, 1964, Alex Colville' in the Masterpieces of Canadian art series. The stamp was designed by Pierre-Yves Pelletier based on a painting Church and Horse (1964) by Alex Colville. The $1.25 stamps are perforated 13 X 13.5 and were printed by Ashton-Potter Limited.

Several of Colville's paintings appear in Stanley Kubrick's 1980 film The Shining, including Woman and Terrier (1963), Horse and Train (1954), Hound in Field (1958), Dog, Boy, and St. John River (1958), and Moon and Cow (1963).

== Writings ==
- Alexander Colville, "A Tribute to Professor George P. Grant". Bell Lecture Series, Carleton University, Ottawa, 1989;

== See also ==
- Canadian official war artists
- War artist
- Military art
- Trains in art
