= Carmen Robertson =

Writer and scholar of art history and indigenous peoples

- Born: 1962 (age 63–64); Fort Qu'Appelle, Saskatchewan, Canada

Academic background
- Education: Portland State University, University of Victoria, Brock University, University of Calgary
- Thesis: Reel artists: National Film Board of Canada portrayals of contemporary aboriginal and Inuit artists and their art. (2005)

Academic work
- Sub-discipline: Women and Gender Studies
- Institutions: University of Regina
- Notable works: Seeing Red: A History of Natives in Canadian Newspapers

Carmen L. Robertson is a writer and scholar of art history and Indigenous peoples. She is Canada Research Chair in North American Art and Material Culture in the Faculty of Arts and Social Sciences at Carleton University. Before joining Carleton, Robertson was an associate professor in the Faculty of Media, Art & Performance at the University of Regina (2006-2012). She also served as the Indian Fine Arts department head at the First Nations University of Canada where she taught from 2000-2006. Robertson works to promote the awareness of Aboriginal artists. A number of Robertson's writings focus on the Aboriginal Canadian artist Norval Morrisseau. She is past president of the Native Heritage Foundation of Canada.

== Early life ==
Robertson was born in Balcarres, Saskatchewan, of Lakota and Scottish ancestry. She received her BA in Liberal Arts at Portland State University in 1989, her MA in Art History at University of Victoria in 1993, her MEd in Aboriginal Adult Education at Brock University in 2001, and her PhD in Educational Research at the University of Calgary in 2005.

== Career ==
Robertson's best-known book is Seeing Red: A History of Natives in Canadian Newspapers, co-written with Mark Cronlund Anderson. Seeing Red is a study about how Canadian English-language newspapers portray Aboriginal people. Seeing Red received the Saskatchewan Book Award for Scholarly Writing (2011), First Peoples' Writing (2011), and Regina Book of The Year (2011).

Robertson co-edited Clearing a Path: New Ways of Seeing Traditional Indigenous Art with Sherry Farrell Racette. This book was published by Regina: Canadian Plains Research Centre in 2009 and it looks at notable Saskatchewan Metis artists.

A number of Robertson's writings focus on the Aboriginal Canadian artist Norval Morrisseau, including Norval Marisseau: A Complex but Critical Legacy. In 2019, she notably testified in the Court of Appeal for Ontario on the in-authenticity of a Morrisseau painting purchased at Maslak-McLeod Gallery by collector Kevin Hearn. This case is featured in the documentary There are no Fakes, produced by TV Ontario, in 2020.

Robertson has curated a number of exhibitions in Canada, including Dana Claxton: The Sioux Project—Tatanka Oyate at the MacKenzie Art Gallery, in Regina, Saskatchewan September–January 2017 – 2018.

Robertson is a past president of the Native Heritage Foundation of Canada, where she advocated accessibility and preservation for collections of aboriginal Canadian art. She also serves on the editorial board of the Australian Journal of Indigenous Education, published by Cambridge University Press.

== Selected bibliography ==
=== Books ===
- Robertson, Carmen L. (2016). Mythologizing Norval Morrisseau: art and the colonial narrative in the Canadian media. Winnipeg, MB: University of Manitoba Press. ISBN 978-0-88755-810-8.
- Robertson, Carmen L. (2016). Norval Morisseau: Life & Work. Toronto, ON: Art Canada Institute. ISBN 978-1-4871-0086-5.
- Anderson, Mark Cronlund; Robertson, Carmen L. (2011). Seeing red : a history of Natives in Canadian newspapers. Winnipeg, MB: University of Manitoba Press. ISBN 978-0887557279.
- Robertson, Carmen; Racette, Sherry Farrell, eds. (2009). Clearing a path : new ways of seeing traditional indigenous art. Regina, SK: University of Regina, Canadian Plains Research Center. ISBN 9780889772267.
- Robertson, Carmen (2004). Abstraction and myth : Neal McLeod. Regina, SK: Dunlop Art Gallery. ISBN 9781894882101.
- Robertson, Carmen (2002). From wigwas to canvas : generations of Woodland art. Regina, SK: MacKenzie Art Gallery. ISBN 9781896470467.
- Robertson, Carmen (2002). From wigwas to canvas : generations of Woodland art. Regina, SK: MacKenzie Art Gallery. ISBN 9781896470467.
- Robertson, Carmen (1999). Le consentement. Cap-Saint-Ignace, Québec: La Plume d'oie. ISBN 9782922183887.
- Robertson, Carmen L. (1993). Gender relations and the Noli Me Tangere scene in renaissance Italy. s.n.] ISBN 9780315843660.

=== Articles ===
- "Land and Beaded Identity: Shaping Art Histories of Indigenous Women of the Flatland". Revue d'art canadienne/Canadian Art Review, Vol. 432, No. 2 : 13-29. 2017.
- Robertson, Carmen L. (2012). "Thunderbirds and Concepts of Transformation in the Art of Norval Morrisseau". Journal of Canadian Art History. 33 (2): 53–70. JSTOR 42616592.
- Robertson, Carmen (2012). "Utilizing PEARL to Teach Indigenous Art History: A Canadian Example". Australian Journal of Indigenous Education. 41 (1): 60–66. doi:10.1017/jie.2012.9. S2CID 145106585.
- Fleischmann, Aloys N. M.; Van Styvendale, Nancy; McCarroll, Cody, eds. (2011). "Imaginary Citizens: The White Paper and the Whitewash in the Press". Narratives of Citizenship: Indigenous and Diasporic Peoples Unsettle the Nation State. Edmonton: University of Alberta Press. pp. 233–262. ISBN 978-0-88864-518-0.
- Martin, Lee-Ann (2008). Bob Boyer : his life's work / le Travail D'une Vie, with essays by Ted Godwin, Carmen Robertson, Alfred Young Man. Regina: MacKenzie Art Gallery. ISBN 9781896470689.
