= Ian M. Thom =

Canadian Curator (born 1952)

- Born: Ian MacEwan Thom; 1952 (age 73–74); Vancouver, British Columbia
- Known for: curator, author, art historian
- Partner: Darrin Martens

Ian M. Thom (born 1952) is a Canadian curator, author, and art historian. He worked over a period of 30 years (interrupted twice) at the Vancouver Art Gallery and retired in 2018.

== Career ==
Thom was born in Vancouver and received his B.A. and M.A. from the University of British Columbia in the late 1960s–early 1970s. Interested in art, he volunteered at the Vancouver Art Gallery (VAG) when Doris Shadbolt was the chief curator. She became his role model.

Thom's first job for the VAG was as cataloguer (1976–1977). He then became registrar (1977–1978), then left for the Art Gallery of Greater Victoria job of registrar (1978–1979), then curator (1979–1980), acting director (1980), and chief curator (1980–1982). From there, he became curator of collections at the McMichael Canadian Art Collection (1982–1988), where among other projects, he published Murals from a Great Canadian Train (1986), organized a show and book of Maria Chapdelaine: Illustrations by Clarence Gagnon, and initiated a David Milne exhibition (completed at the VAG in 1991 along with his book David Milne (Douglas & Mcintyre Ltd and the McMichael Canadian Art Collection). He returned to the VAG in 1988 as Senior Curator. He retired from the VAG in 2018 and since then, has worked as an independent curator and consultant. In 2020, he was granted Emeritus status by the VAG.

Thom's highlights among his 100 exhibitions and catalogues and books while at the VAG include, among many others, the VAG's 1993 Tom Thomson; 1995 Andy Warhol: Images; 2000 Art BC: Masterworks from British Columbia (an independent publication done while at the VAG); its 2002 retrospective of E. J. Hughes; a 2005 retrospective of Takao Tanabe, a collaboration between the VAG and the Art Gallery of Greater Victoria that later toured the country, a 2009 Challenging Traditions, Contemporary First Nations Art of the Northwest Coast, organized for the McMichael Canadian Art Collection which toured the country; the 2010 Leonardo da Vinci: The Mechanics of Man, organized for the VAG in conjunction with The Royal Collection; and Gordon Smith: Don't Look Back (2014) (an independent book). In 2018, he curated a last show at the VAG, A Curator's View. He also was the co-author of catalogues and shows on Gathie Falk (2000), Emily Carr (among them Emily Carr: New Perspectives on a Canadian Icon (2006)), presented by the National Gallery of Canada and the VAG); and B.C. Binning (2006). His catalogues and books have been praised as using language to describe the works that is free of art speak.

In his time as senior curator, the collection doubled in size, from 6,000 to 12,000 works, many by the Group of Seven and Emily Carr (he was responsible for acquiring 165 of her works). He brought into the collection or increasing the representation of such artists as John Vanderpant, Beatrice Lennie, Jock Macdonald and Lilias Farley, as well as First Nations art, both historical and contemporary.

He worked closely with Ron Longstaffe, who donated close to 800 works to the gallery before his death in 2003. Thom was directly responsible for arranging the entry of 195 works from the collection Longstaffe gave to the gallery, including work by Betty Goodwin and B.C. Binning. Since he retired, to celebrate the 100th anniversary of the Group of Seven, he curated Northern Pine: Watercolours and Drawings by the Group of Seven from the McMichael Canadian Art Collection organized by the Kelowna Art Gallery in 2020 with a publication of the same name. He also published Clarence Gagnon: The Maria Chapdelaine Illustrations (Pomegranate & McMichael Canadian Art Collection, 2020). Besides that, he wrote Takao Tanabe: A Modern Landscape, in Takao Tanabe: A Modern Landscape, for the West Vancouver Art Museum, in 2021 and Bess Harris, in Sarah Milroy's catalogue Uninvited: Canadian Women Artists in the Modern Moment, at the McMichael Canadian Art Collection, 2021.

== Controversy ==
While on salary, Thom appraised ten fake sketches, allegedly by J. E. H. MacDonald, as authentic in 2014.

== Awards ==
- Medal from the Royal Canadian Academy (2004)
- Order of Canada (2009)
- Queen's Diamond Jubilee Medal (2012)
- British Columbia Museums Association Distinguished Service Award (2019)
