= Ming Tiampo =

Canadian curator, professor of art history

Ming Tiampo is a Canadian curator, professor of art history and director of the Institute of Comparative Studies in Literature, Art, and Culture at Carleton University, in Ottawa, Ontario, Canada.

== Career ==
Tiampo joined the Carleton University faculty in 2003, shortly before completing her PhD in Art History at Northwestern University in Chicago. Her undergraduate degree is from Princeton University. Tiampo is a specialist in transnational modernisms, with a focus on Japan after 1945. Her research seeks to both add to the body of knowledge on modernism beyond the Euro-American canon, and to re-theorize the Eurocentric terms with which art historians write that history.

Tiampo's book ''Gutai: Decentering Modernism'' (Chicago: University of Chicago Press, 2011) is the foundational study of Japan's most significant postwar movement. Based upon archival research in six countries, Tiampo's book shed light upon this important yet forgotten group, and also established a critical methodology for situating and theorizing non-Western modernisms transnationally.

In 2013, Tiampo co-curated the exhibition, Gutai: Splendid Playground at the Solomon R. Guggenheim Museum (New York City), an exhibition that prompted the notoriously tough New York Times art critic Roberta Smith to comment, "accompanied by a terrific catalog, their effort should permanently dislodge any notion of postwar modernism as a strictly Western phenomenon." The exhibition also received six awards, including the prestigious Association Internationale des Critiques d’Art award for Best Thematic Museum Exhibition in New York that year.

In addition to her work on Gutai, Tiampo has published on Japanese modernism, war art in Japan, globalization and art, multiculturalism in Canada, and the connections between Inuit and Japanese prints. All of these projects cohere through her deep commitment to critically engaging with the cultural consequences of globalization, advocating for new modalities of cultural pluralism, and decolonizing art historical discourses in the academy and the museum.

Not only has Tiampo been prolific, but she has also taken a leadership role in the field, enabling scholarly conversations about world studies on local, national, and international levels. At Carleton, she was a co-founder of the Centre for Transnational Cultural Analysis and instrumental to the centre's active interdisciplinary programme of guest speakers and workshops, which have created an environment of engagement across disciplines for scholars and students. She is also founding associate member of the ICI Berlin Institute for Cultural Inquiry.

== Selected books ==
- Jin-me Yoon: Life & Work. Toronto: Art Canada Institute, 2022. ISBN 978-1-4871-0297-5
- Co-edited with Asato Ikeda, Aya Louisa McDonald, Art and War in Japan and its Empire: 1931-1960. Leiden: Brill Academic Publishers, 2013.
- Co-edited with Alexandra Munroe, Gutai: Splendid Playground. New York: The Solomon R. Guggenheim Museum, 2013.
- Gutai: Decentering Modernism. Chicago: University of Chicago Press, 2011.
- "Under Each Other’s Spell: Gutai and New York." Easthampton: Pollock-Krasner House and Study Center, 2009.
- Electrifying Art: Atsuko Tanaka 1954-1968. Vancouver: The Morris and Helen Belkin Art Gallery, 2004.

== Selected exhibitions ==
- With Sachi Hirono, Mukai Shūji installation at Proportio, Palazzo Fortuny, a collateral exhibition at the Venice Biennale, 2015.
- With Alexandra Munroe, Gutai: Splendid Playground. Solomon R. Guggenheim Museum (February–May 2013), co-curator.
- With Norman Vorano and Asato Ikeda, Traveling Prints: James Houston, Hiratsuka Un’ichi and the Inuit Print Tradition, Prince Takamado Gallery, Embassy of Canada in Tokyo (February–April 2011), co-curator.
- "Under Each Other’s Spell: Gutai and New York." Easthampton: Pollock-Krasner House and Study Center, 2009, New Jersey City University Art Gallery, and David Anderson Gallery, SUNY Buffalo (August–October 2009), curator.
- With Nicole Neufeld and Caroline Vanderloo, ImagiNation: New Cultural Topographies, Carleton University Art Gallery, Ottawa, Ontario, Canada (8 September-2 November 2008), and University of Toronto, Scarborough campus, co-curator.
- Resounding Spirit Live Art Festival. Performance Art Festival, Carleton University Art Gallery, 2007.
- With Mizuho Kato, Electrifying Art: Atsuko Tanaka 1945-1968 Grey Art Gallery, New York University, NYC, USA (September 14-December 11, 2004) and The Morris and Helen Belkin Art Gallery, University of British Columbia, Vancouver, British Columbia, Canada (January 21-March 20, 2005), co-curator.
- With Maggie Price, Resounding Spirit: Japanese Contemporary Art of the 1960s, The Roland Gibson Art Gallery, State University of New York, Potsdam, NY (February–April 2004), and Carleton University Art Gallery (February–April 2007), curatorial consultant and leader of curatorial seminar.
