= Ray Cronin =

Canadian journalist and curator

- Born: Raymond Joseph Cronin; June 11, 1964; New York, New York
- Known for: journalist, curator

Ray Cronin (born June 11, 1964) is a Canadian journalist, artist and contemporary art curator who was appointed Director of Curatorial programs at the Beaverbrook Art Gallery in Fredericton in 2023. From 2008 to 2015, he was Director and CEO of the Art Gallery of Nova Scotia (AGNS) where he had been Senior Curator and Curator of Contemporary Art and additionally, served as the founding curator of the first five Sobey Art Award exhibitions.

== Early career ==
Cronin was born in New York City and grew up in Fredericton, New Brunswick. He is a graduate of the Nova Scotia College of Art and Design (Bachelor of Fine Arts), the University of Windsor (Master of Fine Arts) and the Getty Museum Leadership Institute. He moved to Fredericton in 1993. He is the author of several catalogue essays, as well as numerous articles for Canadian and American art magazines. He was the visual arts columnist for The Daily Gleaner (Fredericton) and Here (Saint John). In 2000, he received the Christina Sabat Award for Critical Review in the Arts.

== Curatorial work ==
In 2001, he assumed the position of Curator of Contemporary Art at the Art Gallery of Nova Scotia (AGNS). He was the founding curator of the Sobey Art Award and served as chair of the Sobey jury until 2008. He currently serves on the Sobey Art Award Governance Committee. In 2006 he was appointed Senior Curator at AGNS, and in December 2007 he added the position of Acting Director and Chief Curator to his duties. He was named Director and CEO of AGNS in June 2008. His curatorial projects include full-career retrospectives of the work of Nancy Edell and David Askevold, as well as the nationally touring exhibitions Graeme Patterson: Woodrow and Arena: The Art of Hockey. At AGNS, Cronin inherited what he described as a "building falling down around our ears", an aging complex which no longer had the space for the gallery collection and exhibits. He obtained funding to study a possible new facility in 2011. In 2023, he was appointed Director of Curatorial Programming at the Beaverbrook Art Gallery in Fredericton.

== Publications ==
Cronin is the author of four online art books published by the Art Canada Institute: "Alex Colville: Life & Work" (2017); "Mary Pratt: Life & Work" (2020); "Maud Lewis: Life & Work" (2021) and Halifax Art & Artists: An Illustrated History (2023). Among his many publications are "Our Maud: The Life, Art and Legacy of Maud Lewis" (Art Gallery of Nova Scotia) and "Nova Scotia Folk Art: An Illustrated Guide" (Nimbus, 2024).
