= Roald Nasgaard =

Canadian curator, art historian (born 1941)

Roald Nasgaard OC
- Born: October 14, 1941 (age 84); Askildrup, Denmark
- Known for: Curator of exhibitions and publications of Canadian abstract art
- Spouse: Lori J. Walters (m. 2007)

Academic background
- Education: University of British Columbia (BA, MA); New York University (PhD)
- Thesis: Willumsen and Symbolist Art 1888–1910 (1973)

Roald Nasgaard OC (born October 14, 1941) is a champion of abstract art in Canada.

== Career ==
Roald Nasgaard received his B.A. from the University of British Columbia in 1965; his M.A. from the University of British Columbia in 1967; and his Ph.D. from the New York University Institute of Fine Arts. He began his career as a lecturer and assistant professor at the University of Guelph (1971–1975), then served as the curator of contemporary art at the Art Gallery of Ontario (AGO), Toronto (1975–1978), chief curator (1978–1989), and deputy director and chief curator (1989–1993). In his role as chief curator, he oversaw the expansion of the gallery's permanent collection, as well as organizing many exhibitions, often of Canadian abstract art and important international exhibitions such as Gerhard Richter: Paintings (1988), Richter's first retrospective exhibition in North America, as well as working with Germano Celant on The European Iceberg: Creativity in Germany and Italy Today (1985). In 1993, he became senior curator of research (1993). He then served as chair of the department of art at Florida State University, Tallahassee (1995–2006), and as professor of art history, since 2006. He is now professor emeritus of that institution.

He was co-organizer of the programming of the Institute of Modern and Contemporary Art, Calgary, Canada; visiting lecturer, University of Guelph, and York University and visiting lecturer, adjunct professor at the University of Toronto. He was also a research fellow at the National Gallery of Canada Library and Archives (summer 2002).

His exhibition The Urge to Abstraction opened in 2007 at the Varley Art Gallery in Markham, Ontario. His traveling exhibition for the Varley Art Gallery, The Automatiste Revolution: Montreal 1941–1960 was exhibited at the Albright-Knox Gallery in Buffalo in 2009. He co-curated The Plasticiens and Beyond: Montreal, 1955–1970 in 2013 at the Musée national des beaux-arts du Québec and the Varley Art Gallery. In 2016, he was one of the curators of Mystical Landscapes: Masterpieces from Monet, Van Gogh and More (AGO and Musée d'Orsay) and in 2017 curated Higher States: Lawren Harris and his American Contemporaries (McMichael Canadian Art Collection and the Glenbow Museum).

== Awards and honours ==
Nasgaard won an Ontario Art Galleries Association Curatorial Writing Award in 1991 for his essay in Individualités: 14 Contemporary Artists from France. He has held several Canada Council fellowships (1967–1968), (1970–1971) and grants as well as a Research Fellowship at the National Gallery of Canada Library and Archives (2002) and a Cornerstone (AHPEG) Grant, FSU (2006–2007). He was made an Officer of the Order of Canada in 2012. He also has been a member of the Toronto Public Art Commission and of the Gershon Iskowitz Foundation.

== Bibliography ==
=== Exhibition Catalogues ===
Nasgaard has been the author of many exhibition catalogues, including, among others: Yves Gaucher: A Fifteen-Year Perspective (1979), Structures for Behaviour: New Sculptures by Robert Morris, David Rabinowitch, Richard Serra and George Trakas (1978), and The Mystic North: Symbolist Landscape Painting in Northern Europe and North America, 1890-1940 (1984) which Artforum magazine called a "sweeping survey of Symbolist landscape painting in Northern Europe and North America", adding the catalogue was "fine". It said that Nasgaard had located a "European ancestry for early Modern Canadian painting".

In 2001 the Florida State University Museum of Fine Arts published his Pleasures of Sight and States of Being: Radical Abstract Painting Since 1990.

=== Books ===
- Nasgaard, Roald (1984). The Mystic North: Symbolist Landscape Painting in Northern Europe and North America, 1890–1940. Toronto: University of Toronto Press. ISBN 978-0-8020-6544-5.
- Nasgaard, Roald (2007). Abstract Painting in Canada. Vancouver: Douglas & MacIntyre. ISBN 9781553653943.
- Nasgaard, Roald; Ellenwood, Ray (2009). The Automatiste Revolution: Montreal, 1941–1960. Douglas & McIntyre. ISBN 978-1-55365-356-1.
- Nasgaard, Roald; Martin, Michel; Lamarche, Lise; Leclerc, Denise (2013). Les plasticiens et les années 1950-60. Quebec: Musée national des beaux-arts du Québec. OCLC 830024393.
- Nasgaard, Roald (2015). Yves Gaucher: Life & Work. Toronto: Art Canada Institute. ISBN 978-1-4871-0052-0.
- Nasgaard, Roald; Owens, Gwendolyn (2017). Higher States: Lawren Harris and His American Contemporaries. Goose Lane Editions. ISBN 978-0-86492-965-5.
- Nasgaard, Roald (2024). Eli Bornstein: Life & Work. Art Canada Institute. ISBN 978-1-4871-0347-7.

Higher States was reviewed favorably with reservations, with a reviewer saying, "Both essays are lucidly written, profusely illustrated, and logically argued. Unfortunately, many important parts of the plot are missing".
