= Sophie Pemberton =

Canadian painter (1869–1959)

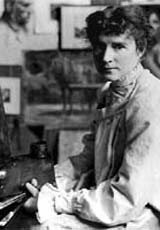
- Born: February 13, 1869; Victoria, British Columbia
- Died: October 31, 1959 (aged 90); Victoria, British Columbia
- Resting place: Ross Bay Cemetery
- Known for: painter

Sophia Theresa "Sophie" Pemberton (13 February 1869 – 31 October 1959) was a Canadian painter who was British Columbia's first professional woman artist. Despite the social limitations placed on female artists at the time, she made a noteworthy contribution to Canadian art and, in 1899, was the first woman to win the Prix Julian from the Académie Julian for portraiture. Pemberton also was the first artist from British Columbia to receive international acclaim when her work was exhibited at the Royal Academy in London (1897).

Pemberton married twice with subsequent changes in surname, complicating her visibility as an artist. She lived half her life in England, exhibiting frequently there but infrequently in Canada. She returned to her hometown Victoria on occasion to reconnect with family and friends.

She also played a role in Emily Carr's 'discovery'. The two artists grew up together in the same small city. While in British Columbia in 1921, Pemberton talked with Harold Mortimer-Lamb about Emily Carr. He told Eric Brown, director at the National Gallery of Canada about Carr, leading to an invitation by the National Gallery of Canada for her work to be part of an exhibition on West Coast Art in 1927.

== Early years ==
Born in Victoria, British Columbia, Sophie, as she was known throughout her life, was the daughter of Theresa Jane Grautoff and Joseph Despard Pemberton (1821–1893), an engineer and surveyor, employed by the Hudson's Bay Company on Vancouver Island. He was later a politician and successful businessman.

Pemberton first studied art at Mrs. Cridge's Reformed Episcopal School and at age 13 had two watercolour landscapes included in a presentation album for the visiting Princess Louise, Duchess of Argyll. She often sketched en plein air, and recorded landscapes of the Cowichan Bay and Shawnigan Lake areas north of Victoria as well as the Fraser Valley. She attended finishing school in Brighton, UK where she received preliminary training in oil painting. Working from her studio in the family home, Pemberton aimed at becoming a professional artist.

== Training abroad ==
In 1890, she travelled to London and studied with Arthur S. Cope following the curriculum of the South Kensington School of Art, where she excelled in her studies. She returned to Victoria afterward but came back to England, to the Clapham School of Art (1892–1893), taking the South Kensington School exams, receiving first-class grades in drawing from life, the antique, and still life, and had begun to attend the Westminster School of Art when in 1893 her father died and she experienced an emotional and physical breakdown, returning to Victoria the following year to recuperate. Her life would be punctuated, at inconvenient and unexpected moments with episodes of (possibly psychosomatic) ill health with severe physical weakness.

In London again in 1895, she established herself in a studio in Chelsea, and met a network of artists, among them Anna Nordgren and Canadian artists Sydney Strickland Tully (with whom she shared a painting model) and Florence Carlyle. She went on a sketching trip to Brittany with Nordgren in 1896. Between 1896 and 1898 Pemberton exhibited steadily, receiving positive reviews. She was a member of the women's 91 Art Club and was active in the movement for women's suffrage. A major breakthrough for Pemberton came when the Royal Academy of Arts accepted Daffodils, 1897, a large academic realist oil painting, for its annual London summer exhibition.

In 1898, she enrolled at the Académie Julian in Paris, studying with Jean Paul Laurens and Jean-Joseph Benjamin-Constant. It was a time-period when women artists generally received segregated art training and their accomplishments often were considered secondary to that of men. In 1899, she had the honour of being the first woman to receive the Prix Julian, a gold medal and cash award presented annually for the best student portrait at the academie, in a contest open to both men and women.

The following year she received the Julian-Smith Prix of 300 francs, another important achievement, reflecting the high quality of her portraiture. In 1900, Pemberton returned to live in Victoria following five highly successful years working in Europe. Pemberton's goal was a serious one, to become a professional portrait artist, and she did so in a culture and at a time when formal portraiture in her chosen media, oil painting had been largely the domain of men.

== Work ==
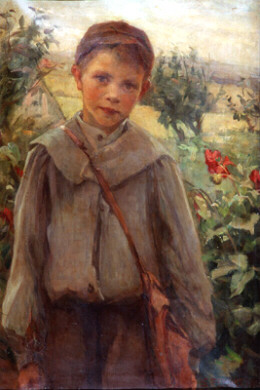
"Little Boy Blue" (1897) by Sophie Pemberton (1869–1959)

She painted portraits and landscapes in oil. Also from her earliest days, she painted finely detailed botanical studies in watercolour.

English and European influences can be seen in her work, primarily from the academic tradition of British portraiture and the Barbizon school but there are indications that she was aware of the French Impressionists and the current trends in art as reflected in the public exhibitions and private galleries.

On her retreats home to Victoria, Pemberton also taught painting to local female artists, sharing the experiences of her formal art training. In 1909, she painted a large mural for the non-denominational Pemberton Memorial Chapel gifted by her family to Victoria's Royal Jubilee Hospital. This may be her only instance of public art.

== Selected exhibitions ==
Pemberton showed her work at many regional galleries in the UK (1895-1898), at the Art Association of Montreal (AAM) (1895 and in 1910), the Royal Canadian Academy of Arts (1904, 1907, 1909), the Royal Academy in London (1897, 1898, 1901, 1904, 1907, 1910, 1916), the Paris Salon with honourable mention medal in 1899 for her painting Little Boy Blue (Art Gallery of Greater Victoria) (1899, 1900 and 1903), the Canadian section of the Exposition Universelle in Paris (1900),in Victoria (1902, 1904), in Vancouver (1904), and in the Canadian exhibition at the Louisiana Purchase Exposition (the St. Louis World's Fair) (1904). She exhibited 30 of her works at the Provincial Agricultural Exhibition in Victoria, B.C. and a show of The Pemberton Pictures in Vancouver (both 1904). She had a solo show of 40 oil landscapes at the Doré Gallery in London in 1909. In Victoria, she also had work in the Island Arts and Crafts Society exhibitions in 1916, 1921, and 1922.

A selection of her work was shown in 1949 at the precursor to the Art Gallery of Greater Victoria (AGGV), and a retrospective at the Vancouver Art Gallery in 1954. After her death, the AGGV, the main repository of her work, held a small second retrospective, in 1967 and a major one in 1978.

In 2023, the AGGV organized a full-scale retrospective titled Unexpected: The Life and Art of Sophie Pemberton, Canadian Artist, guest curated by Dr. Kathryn Bridge who extensively researched Pemberton and discovered that the artist's career which had been thought to came to an abrupt end shortly after her first marriage, and move of residence to the UK in 1909, forcing her into relative obscurity, actually was longer. Fascinating examples of her later work were included in this large (70 works, photographs, letters, diaries), important show. Also in 2023 to accompany the show, Bridge wrote, Sophie Pemberton: Life & Work for the Art Institute of Canada, available online, which supplied additional information on Pemberton, including her extensive sketching travels in Europe, friendship with Victoria Sackville-West (mother of Vita Sackville-West), her role in the Women's Suffrage Movement, and her baffling recurring illnesses.

== Selected public collections ==
Pemberton's work is in the Art Gallery of Greater Victoria, Vancouver Art Gallery, Royal British Columbia Museum/B.C. Archives, and the Art Gallery of Hamilton.

== Selected honours and awards ==
- 1899: first woman to receive the Prix Julian, the Gold Medal awarded annually for the best work done in the Academie Julian in Paris;
- 1899: honourable mention medal at the Paris Salon for her painting Little Boy Blue (Art Gallery of Greater Victoria);
- 1900: Julian Smith Foundation Prize of Chicago.

== Memberships ==
She was elected an associate member of the Royal Canadian Academy of Arts in 1906 and was a member of the B.C. Society of Fine Arts.

== Personal life ==
In 1905, she married widower Arthur Beanlands, a Canon in the Anglican church, and lived with him in England from 1909 until his death in 1917. From 1912–1922, she resided in Sevenoaks, Kent. She married again in 1920 to another widower, Horace Deane-Drummond and traveled with him to Ceylon and India. They settled in Gloucestershire. He died in 1930, after which she moved to London, living not far from her early studio and refused to move despite the Blitz bombings of London during the Second World War.

From 1949 until her death, Pemberton lived in her hometown of Victoria, British Columbia. She died on October 31, 1959, in Victoria and was interred there in Ross Bay Cemetery.
