= Emily Carr House =

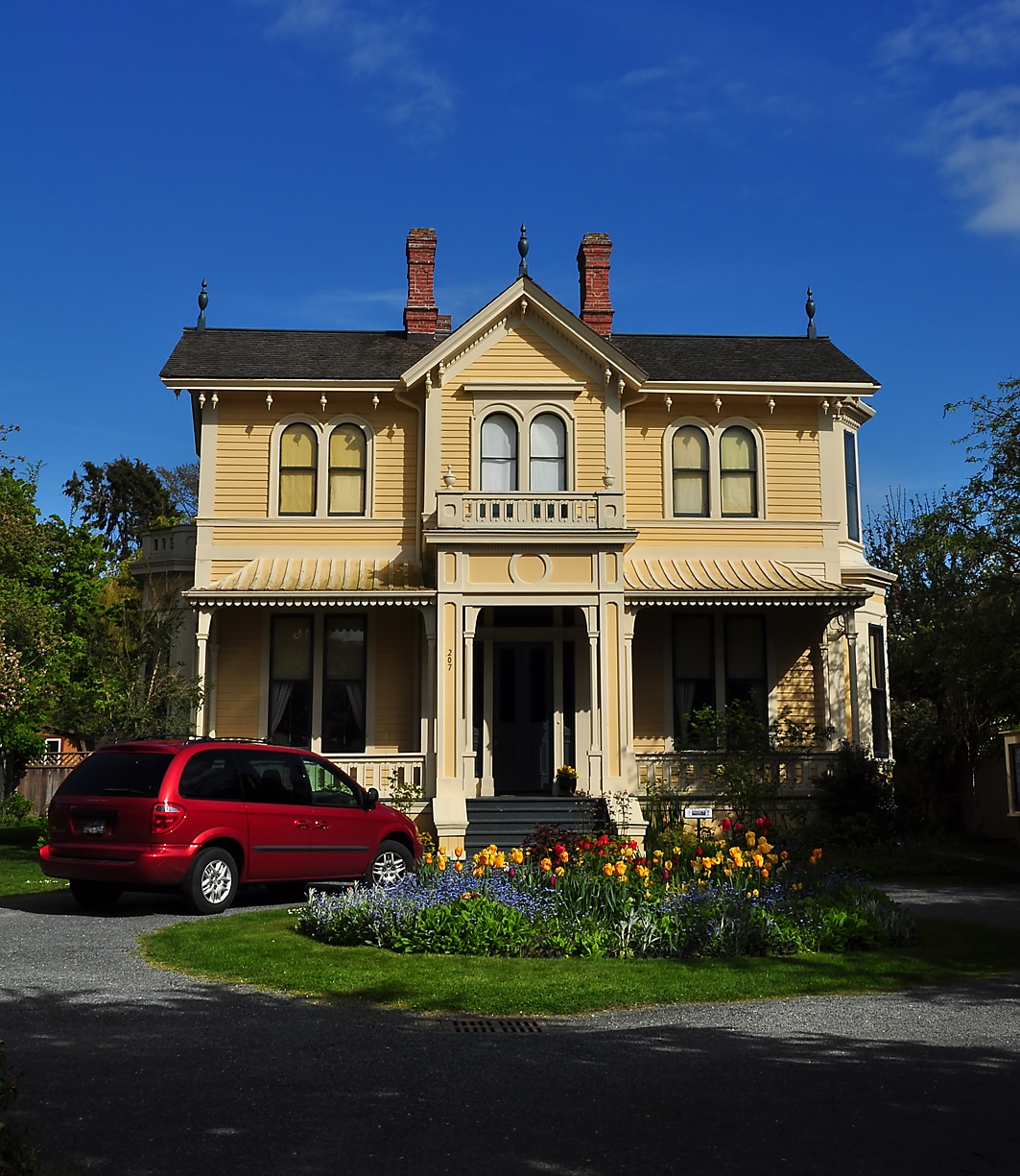
- Interactive map of Emily Carr House
- 48.4138°N 123.37°W
- Type: Residence
- Location: 207 Government Street; Victoria, British Columbia

History
- Built: 1863–1864
- Built for: Richard Carr and Emily Saunders

Site notes
- Architect: John Wright
- Architectural style: Picturesque-Italianate
- Owner: Province of British Columbia
- Website: https://www.carrhouse.org

National Historic Site of Canada
- Official name: Emily Carr House National Historic Site of Canada
- Designated: 27 October 1964
- Reference no.: 90

Emily Carr House (also known as Carr House) is a National Historic Site located in Victoria, British Columbia. It was the childhood home of Canadian painter Emily Carr, and had a lasting impression on her paintings and writings.

== Early history ==
Built in 1863 for the affluent Carr family, the house address was originally 44 Carr Street on a large property owned by Emily Carr's father, Richard. The building was designed in an Italianate style by prominent local architects Wright & Sanders, who also built another Victorian National Historic Site, the Fisgard Lighthouse. The area was the heart of 19th century Victoria, with many other merchants, businessmen, and politicians such as the Dunsmuirs living in the area, many of whom commissioned other important buildings, such as Helmcken House. Structurally, the building is an excellent and well-preserved heritage example of the Italianate villa style popular at the time.

The site is most notable for its association with Emily Carr; artist and writer. Born in 1871, Carr spent much of her life within walking distance of her family home, and the environment left a lasting impression on her which is mentioned in all of her books. In her 1942 The Book of Small, a young Emily offers a description of Carr street, and her house, as it appeared around 1880:

Our street was called Carr Street after my Father. We had a very nice house and a lovely garden... Carr Street was a very fine street. The dirt road waved up and down and in and out. the horses made it that way, zigzagging the carts and carriages through it. The rest of the street was green grass and wild roses. [...] In front of our place Father had made a gravel walk but after our trees stopped there were just two planks to walk on. As far back as I can remember Father's place was all made and in order. The house was large and well-built, of Californian redwood, the garden prim and carefully tended. Everything about it was extremely English. It was as though Father had buried tremendous homesickness in this new soil and it had rooted and sprung up English. There were hawthorn hedges, primrose banks, and cow pastures with shrubberies."

Emily lived in the house for most of her childhood, before leaving to pursue artistic training in San Francisco, London and Paris. Her father's death in 1888 left ownership of the farm to her elder sister, Edith Carr, who divided up the estate into lots which were sold off, with the Carr sisters retaining five of them.

Upon her return to Victoria in 1913, Emily built her own house adjacent to Carr House at 646 Simcoe Street. Her time here was immortalized in her 1944 book The House of All Sorts — the structure still stands and contains a mural she painted on the attic roof in the style of First Nations. Her sisters Edith and Alice also built houses surrounding Carr House — Alice Carr House was run like a kindergarten by Alice, and Emily occasionally held art lessons in the building.

== Later history and restoration ==
Carr House passed through the Carr family for several years, before being sold to a private owner for use as a rental property. The building was extensively modernized following a fire in 1938. In 1964, MP David Groos saved the building from demolition and turned it over to the Emily Carr Foundation three years later, for use as an art gallery and school known as the Emily Carr Arts Centre. In 1976, the provincial government purchased the property, and helped return the building to its original condition.

The building was extensively restored by two different architects, undoing many of the additions and modernizations that had been added to the house since the 19th century. The wood finishes, mentioned by Carr, were restored from scratch, while the exterior of the house was returned to its original design and colour using period photos from Emily Carr's lifetime. The interior of the house is faithful to the original, following the painstaking removal of layers of newer paint and wallpaper to discover the original pattern and colours used inside.

Most of the original artifacts in the home have long-since been replaced; however, a handful have been recovered and restored. The Carr family Bible was recovered, along with some of the original pieces of hardware for the doors and windows. Most items from the house have been replaced with replicas, or other period artifacts — such as the piano in parlour, which was originally owned by neighbours of the Carr family.

Carr House is currently a cultural centre celebrating Emily Carr's life through seasonal tours, rotating exhibits, programming and events. It is operated by a nonprofit organization, the Carr House Community Society, and owned by the Province of British Columbia. Carr House is located at 207 Government Street, six blocks from Victoria's Inner Harbour and the Parliament Buildings. In addition to the heritage rooms, Carr House is surrounded by a Victorian style garden. Throughout the year, Carr House hosts guided tours, art workshops, writing workshops, and special events. Programming explores key themes of Emily Carr's life such as art, environmentalism, respect for First Nations communities, feminism, and mentorship of emerging artists and writers.

== See also ==
- List of historic places in Victoria, British Columbia
