= Vera (Olivia) Weatherbie =

Canadian painter

Vera Weatherbie
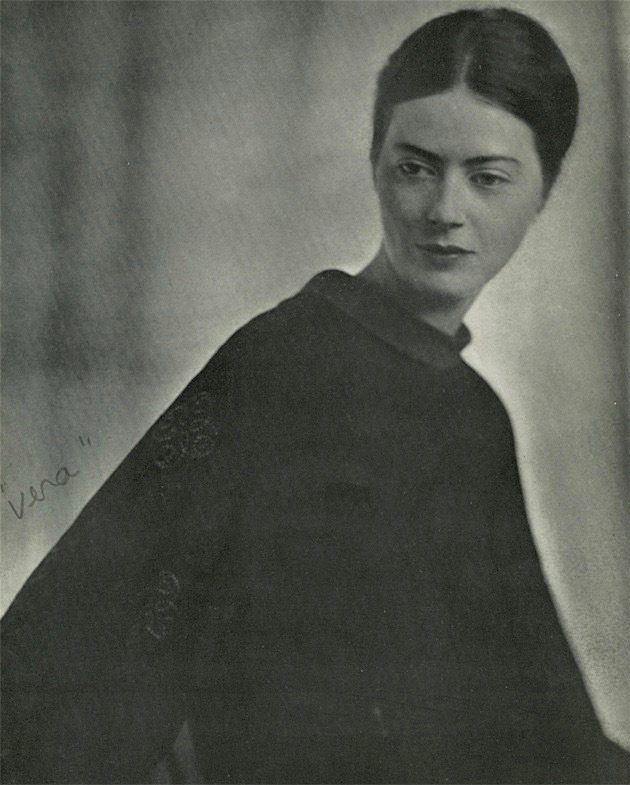
- Vera Weatherbie by John Vanderpant, 1930
- Born: Vera Olivia Weatherbie; 1909; Vancouver, British Columbia, Canada
- Died: 1977 (aged 67); Burnaby, British Columbia, Canada
- Education: Vancouver School of Decorative and Applied Art, Royal Academy Art
- Known for: Painting
- Notable work: Portrait of F.H. Varley, Clam Diggers, and My-E-En
- Movement: Modernism
- Spouse: Harold Mortimer Lamb
- Awards: Vancouver Exhibition Association Scholarship in Drawing and Painting

Vera (Olivia) Weatherbie (1909-1977) was a Vancouver painter and one of the first graduates from the Vancouver School of Decorative Applied Art. Weatherbie was known for her connections with the Group of Seven Painter, VSDAA faculty member, and co-founder of the British Columbia College of Arts, Frederick Varley.

== Education ==
Weatherbie was born in 1909 in Vancouver and went to Britannia Secondary School.

Weatherbie attended the Vancouver School of Decorative Applied Art, now Emily Carr University of Art and Design, from 1925 to 1929 with fellow painter and friend Irene Hoffar Reid.

Weatherbie continued her education in 1932-1933 completing post-graduate studies at the Royal Academy of Arts in London where she expanded her skill in diffused light, muted colour, and fractured surfaces. Upon her return from London, Weatherbie took a position as a painting instructor at the British Columbia College of Arts in Vancouver. The school was founded by Frederick Varley, Jock Macdonald and Harry Täuberwas. Weatherbie worked at the British Columbia College of Arts until it closed due to financial troubles in 1935.

== Impact on Artists ==
Weatherbie was well known both as a model and muse for such artists as Frederick Varley and her spouse Harold Mortimer Lamb. Varley created a number of portraits of Weatherbie with one of his most celebrated paintings titled Vera (1931) becoming a part of the Masterpieces of Canadian art series postage stamps issued by Canada Post on May 6, 1994.

While a student of Varley's at the School of Decorative and Applied Arts in Vancouver, Weatherbie was known for having taught Varley about auras. Harry Adaskin, a Canadian violinist and author, noted, "'Vera, who was involved in mystical speculation, taught Varley about auras: vibrations which surround all people revealing the true state of their emotions and spirit. These vibrations were depicted as colour by those spiritually ready to receive them."

== Reception ==
Although Weatherbie has been considered underrated for her time, she did receive recognition for some of her work through awards and reception. Weatherbie was applauded for Portrait of F.H. Varley (1930, oil on canvas and board, 99.0 cm x 85.0 cm) for her ability to capture her subject. Blodwen Davies of the Toronto Star Weekly on January 21, 1931 stated, "Miss Weatherbie has attempted to paint not only a keenly discerning study of the face of the artist, but she has invaded the world of metaphysics in a daring effort to commit to paint the immaterial qualities of personality."

== Personal life ==
Weatherbie married Canadian artist Harold Mortimer Lamb on May 4, 1942.

Weatherbie died at the age of sixty-seven in Burnaby, British Columbia.

== Exhibitions ==
- VAG BC Society of Artists, 1929
- VAG BC Artists Annual, 1932, 1933, 1934, 1938
- Night Time, Art Gallery of Toronto and the Twenty-third Annual Exhibition of Northwest Artists (Seattle Art Museum)

== Awards ==
- Vancouver Exhibition Association Scholarship in Drawing & Painting for 1927/28, 1928/29
- Fyfe-Smith Travelling Scholarship, 1929/30
- Beatrice Stone Medal in Painting
