= Emily Carr =

Canadian artist and writer (1871–1945)

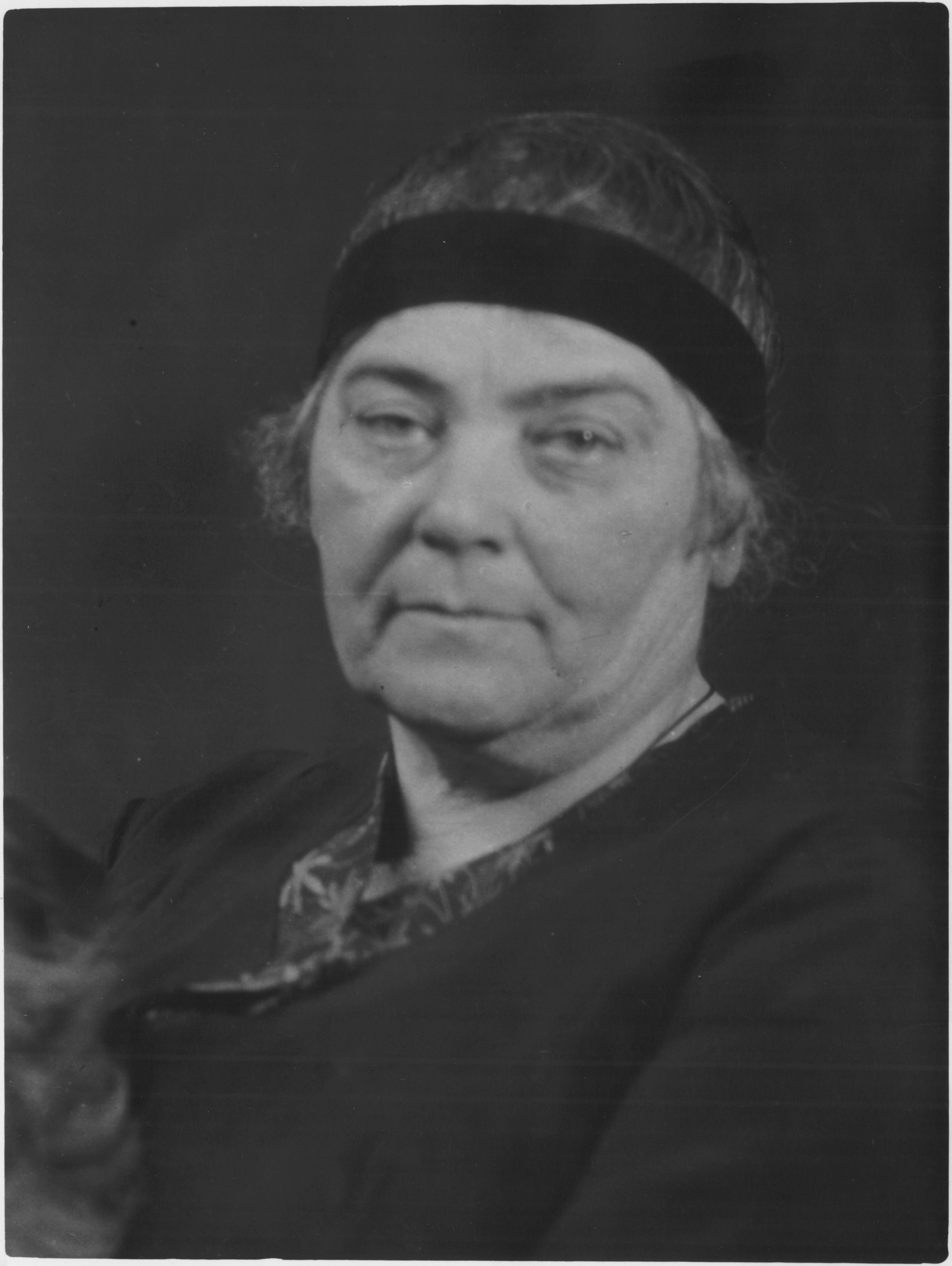
- Carr in 1930
- Born: Millie Emily Carr; December 13, 1871; Victoria, British Columbia, Canada
- Died: March 2, 1945 (aged 73); Victoria, British Columbia, Canada
- Resting place: Ross Bay Cemetery, Victoria, British Columbia
- Education: San Francisco Art Institute; Westminster School of Art; Académie Colarossi
- Known for: Painting, writing
- Notable work: The Indian Church; Big Raven; Klee Wyck
- Style: Post-Impressionism
- Movement: Group of Seven (associated)

Emily Carr (December 13, 1871 – March 2, 1945) was a Canadian artist who was inspired by the monumental art and villages of the First Nations and the landscapes of British Columbia. She also was a vivid writer and chronicler of life in her surroundings, praised for her "complete candour" and "strong prose". Klee Wyck, her first book, published in 1941, won the Governor General's Literary Award for non-fiction and this book and others written by her or compiled from her writings later are still much in demand today.

Carr's keynote paintings, such as The Indian Church (1929), were not widely known in Canada at first. But her stature as one of Canada's most important artists continued to grow. Today, she is considered a cherished, even revered figure of Canadian arts and letters. Scholars and the public alike regard her as a Canadian national treasure and the Canadian Encyclopedia describes her as a Canadian icon. She has been designated a National Historic Person and had a Minor planet 5688 Kleewyck named after her anglicized native name (Klee Wyck). As one scholar in her 2014 book on Carr, put it, "we love her and she continues to speak to us".

Emily Carr lived most of her life in the city in which she was born and died, Victoria, British Columbia.

== Early life ==
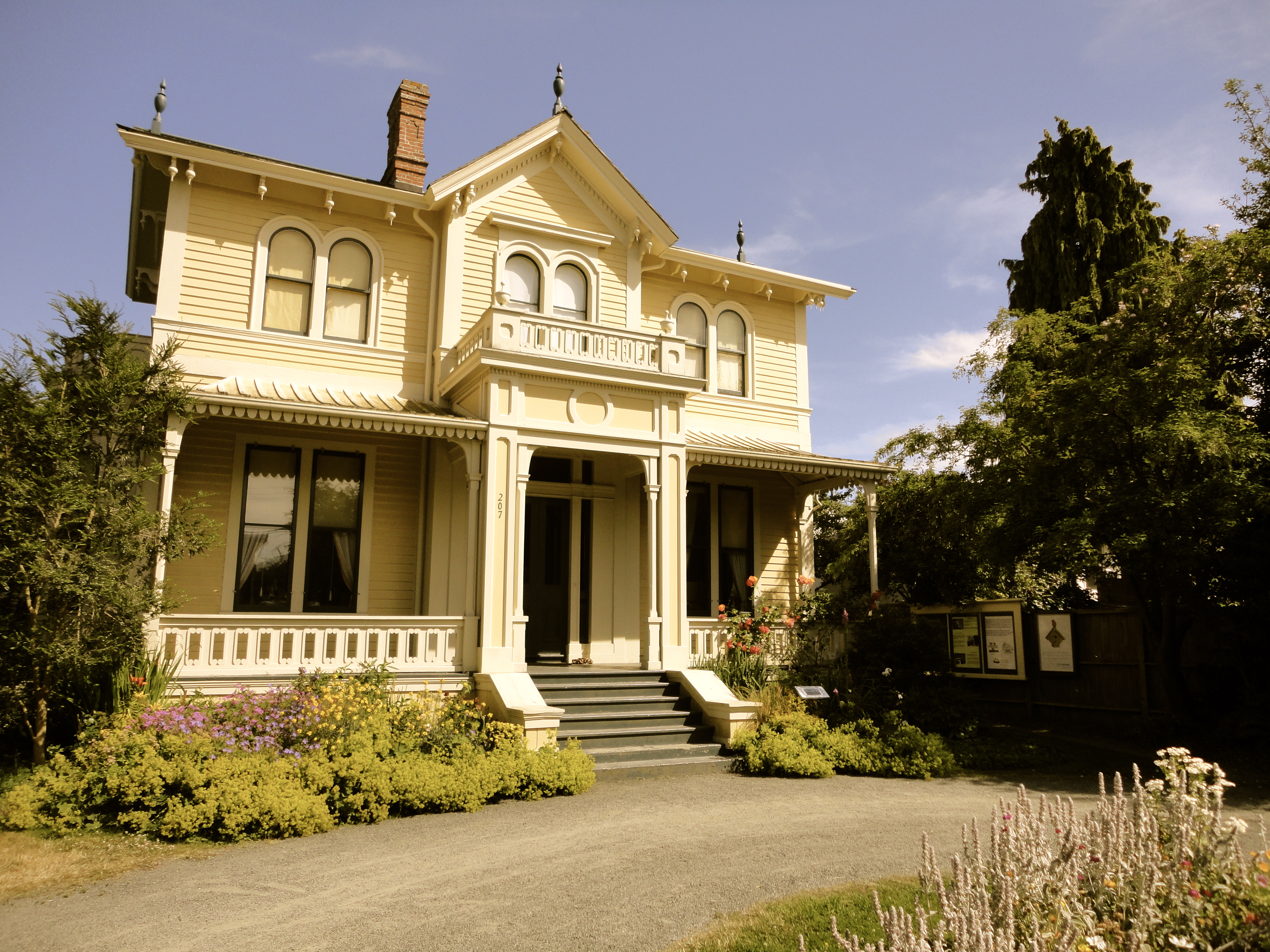
Emily Carr House, 207 Government Street, Victoria – now a National Historic Site of Canada and a museum

Born in Victoria, British Columbia, in 1871, the year British Columbia joined Canada, Emily Carr was the second youngest of nine children born to English parents Richard and Emily (Saunders) Carr. The Carr home was on Birdcage Walk (now Government Street), in the James Bay district of Victoria, a short distance from the legislative buildings (nicknamed the 'Birdcages') and the town itself. Today it is a museum and National Historic Site of Canada called Emily Carr House.

The Carr children were raised in an English tradition. Her father believed it was sensible to live on Vancouver Island, a colony of Great Britain, where he could practice English customs and continue his British citizenship. The family home was made up in lavish English fashion, with high ceilings, ornate moldings, and a parlour. Carr was taught in the Presbyterian tradition, with Sunday morning prayers and evening Bible readings. Her father called on one child per week to recite the sermon, and Emily consistently had trouble reciting it.

Carr's mother died in 1886, and her father died in 1888. Her oldest sister Edith Carr became the guardian of the rest of the children.

Carr's father encouraged her artistic inclinations, but it was only in 1890, after her parents' deaths, that Carr pursued her art seriously. She studied at the California School of Design in San Francisco for three years (1890–1893) before returning to Victoria. In 1899, in some ways overcoming her family background, Carr visited Ucluelet on the west coast of Vancouver Island. That same year, Carr traveled to London, where she decided to transform herself into a professional artist and to make it her life's calling.

She began her studies at the Westminster School of Art. She then took art classes from John William Whiteley in Bushey, Hertfordshire and afterwards traveled to an art colony in St Ives, Cornwall, studying with Julius Olsson and Algernon Talmage (1901). In 1902, she returned to Bushey, and studied with Whiteley, till she experienced a nervous breakdown and had to convalesce.

She returned to British Columbia in 1904. In 1905, she gave children's art classes as well as creating political cartoons for the Week, a newspaper in Victoria and in 1906, Carr took a teaching position in Vancouver at the Vancouver Studio Club and School of Art for a short time – she was a popular teacher but left to open her own studio and give children's art classes.

== First works on Indigenous people ==
In 1898, at age 27, Carr made the first of several sketching and painting trips to Aboriginal villages. She stayed in a village near Ucluelet on the west coast of Vancouver Island, home to the Nuu-chah-nulth people, then commonly known to English-speaking people as 'Nootka'. Carr was given the Indigenous name of Klee Wyck and she also chose it as the title of her first book. She later recalled that her time in Ucluelet made "a lasting impression on me".

In 1907, Carr made a sightseeing trip to Alaska with her sister Alice and decided on her artistic mission of documenting all she could of what she and many others perceived as the "vanishing totems" and way of life of the First Nations. She may have met an American artist on this trip, likely Theodore J. Richardson (1855–1914), who described his project of documenting Indigenous art and architecture (he travelled with Indigenous guides to produce watercolours and pastels in southeast Alaska documenting the Tlingit culture) and that possibly this encounter inspired Carr to initiate her own five–year project of documenting Indigenous villages and their neighbouring forests in British Columbia.

From 1908 to 1910, she made several trips to First Nations communities to record art and villages.

== Work in France ==
Determined to further her knowledge of evolving artistic trends abroad, in 1910 Carr returned to Europe to study. In Montparnasse with her sister Alice, Emily Carr met modernist painter Harry Phelan Gibb with a letter of introduction. Upon viewing his work, she and her sister were shocked and intrigued by his use of distortion and vibrant colour; she wrote:

"Mr Gibb's landscapes and still life delighted me — brilliant, luscious, clean. Against the distortion of his nudes I felt revolt."

Carr enrolled at the Académie Colarossi in Paris, then transferred to private lessons with John Duncan Fergusson and followed him to the Atelier Blanche. After a bout of illness, she joined Gibb and his wife in the small village of Crécy-en-Brie and then St. Efflam, Brittany. Carr's study with Gibb and his techniques shaped and influenced her style of painting, and she adopted a vibrant colour palette rather than continuing with the more modified colours of her earlier training.

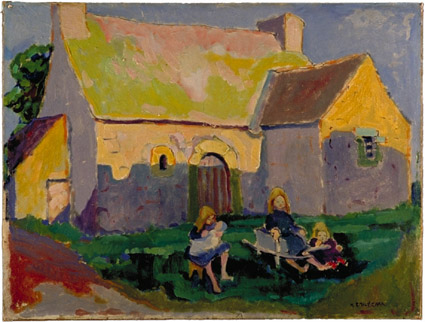
Emily Carr, Breton church, oil on canvas, 1906

In Crecy-en-Brie she fully embraced the Fauve style of bold colour and broad brushwork, then traveled to Concarneau on the coast of Brittany to study with Frances Hodgkins. When she returned to Paris she found that two of her paintings had been selected by the jury and hung in the 1911 Salon d'Automne.

== Return to Canada ==
In March 1912, Carr opened a studio at 1465 West Broadway in Vancouver. She organized an exhibition of seventy watercolours and oils representative of her time in France, using her radical new style, bold colour palette and lack of detail. She was the first artist to introduce Post-Impressionism to Vancouver.

Later in 1912, Carr took a sketching trip to First Nations' villages in Haida Gwaii (formerly the Queen Charlotte Islands), the Upper Skeena River, and Alert Bay where she documented the art of the Haida, Gitxsan and Tsimshian. At Cumshewa, a Haida village on Moresby Island, she wrote in Klee Wyck,

"Cumshewa seems always to drip, always to be blurred with mist, its foliage always to hang wet-heavy ... these strong young trees ... grew up round the dilapidated old raven, sheltering him from the tearing winds now that he was old and rotting ... the memory of Cumshewa is of a great lonesomeness smothered in a blur of rain".

Carr painted a carved raven, which she later developed as her iconic painting Big Raven. Tanoo, another painting inspired by work gathered on this trip, depicts three totems before house fronts at the village of the same name. On her return to the south, Carr organized a large exhibition of some of this work. She gave a detailed public talk titled "Lecture on Totem Poles" about the Aboriginal villages that she had visited, which ended with her mission statement:

"I glory in our wonderful west and I hope to leave behind me some of the relics of its first primitive greatness. These things should be to us Canadians what the ancient Briton's relics are to the English. Only a few more years and they will be gone forever into silent nothingness and I would gather my collection together before they are forever past".

Her "Lecture on Totems" at Dominion Hall in Vancouver is in the Emily Carr Papers at the British Columbia Provincial Archives in Victoria. In the lecture, she said "every pole shown in my collection has been studied from its own actual reality..."

While there was some positive reaction to her work, even in the new 'French' style, Carr perceived that Vancouver's reaction to her work and new style was not positive enough to support her career. She recounted as much in her book Growing Pains. She was determined to give up teaching and working in Vancouver, and in 1913 she returned to Victoria, where several of her sisters still lived.

During the next 15 years, Carr did little painting. She ran a boarding house known as the 'House of All Sorts'. It was the namesake and provided source material for her later book. With her financial circumstances straitened and her life in Victoria circumscribed, Carr painted a few works in this period drawn from local scenes: the cliffs at Dallas Road, the trees in Beacon Hill Park. Her own assessment of the period was that she had ceased to paint, which was not strictly true, although "[a]rt had ceased to be the primary drive of her life".

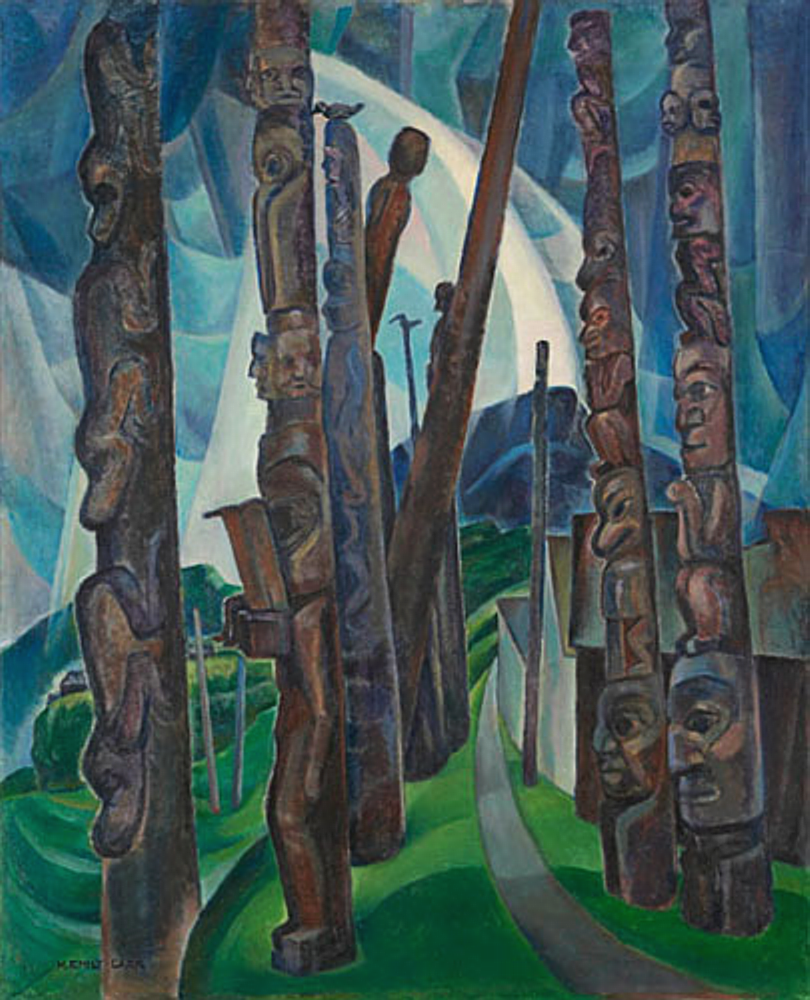
Emily Carr, Kitwancool, 1928

== Growing recognition ==
Over time Carr's work came to the attention of several influential and supportive people, including (through the intervention of Victoria-born artist Sophie Pemberton in 1921) Harold Mortimer-Lamb and Marius Barbeau, a prominent ethnologist at the National Museum in Ottawa. Barbeau in turn persuaded Eric Brown, Director of Canada's National Gallery, to visit Carr in 1927. Brown invited Carr to exhibit her work at the National Gallery as part of an exhibition on West Coast art. Carr sent 65 oil paintings east (31 were included), along with samples of her pottery and rugs with Indigenous designs. The exhibition, which was largely of First Nations art, included works by Edwin Holgate and A.Y. Jackson as well as Carr, traveled to Toronto and Montreal.

== Association with the Group of Seven ==
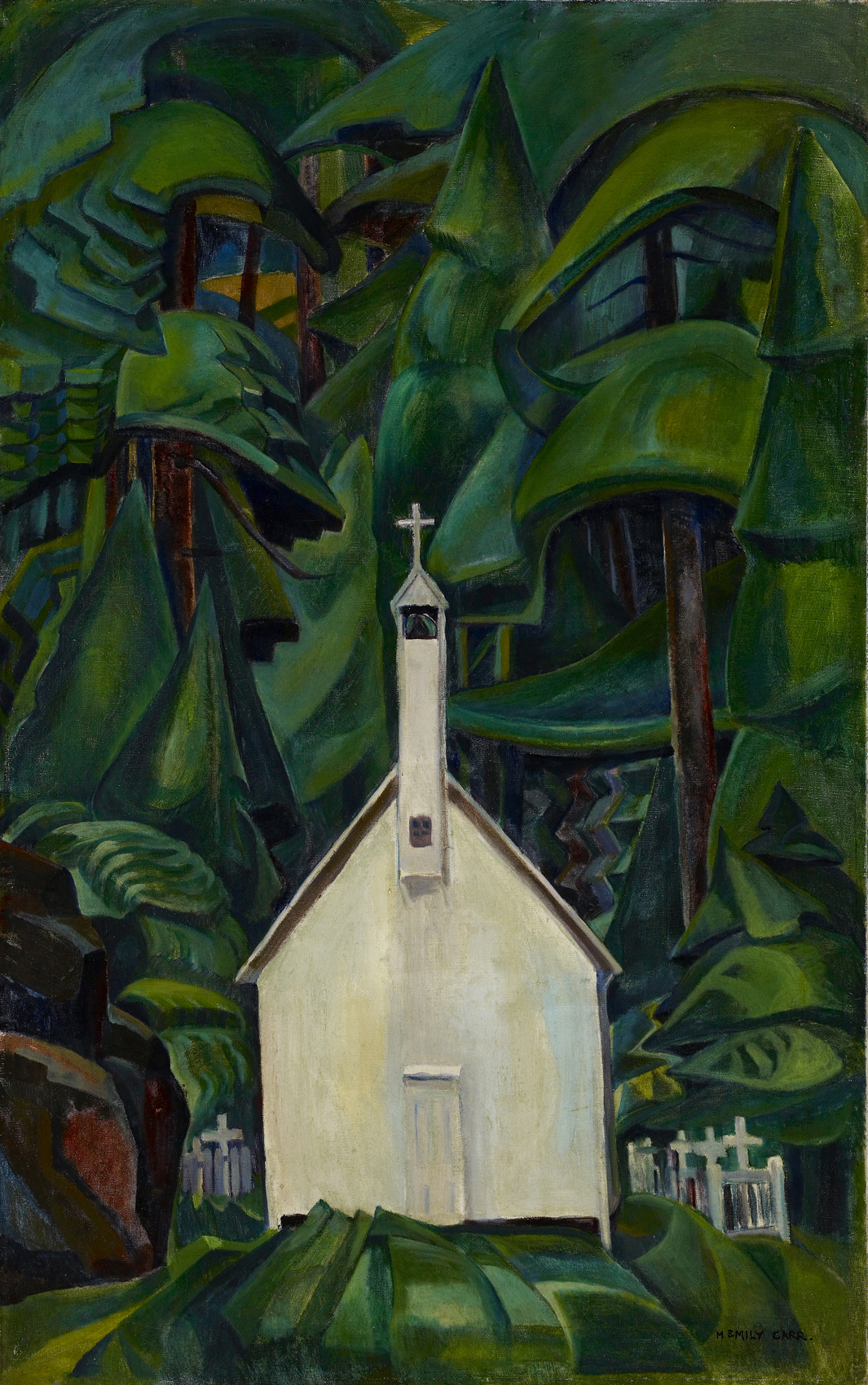
Carr's The Indian Church, 1929. Lawren Harris bought the painting and showcased it in his home. He considered it Carr's best work. It was controversially retitled in 2018 by the Art Gallery of Ontario to Church at Yuquot Village

Carr made the trip east for the exhibition on West Coast art: Native and modern at the National Gallery of Canada in 1927. She met Frederick Varley in Vancouver and other members of the Group of Seven, at that time Canada's most recognized modern painters at the show's Toronto venue.

Lawren Harris of the Group became an important mentor and friend. "You are one of us," he told Carr, welcoming her into the ranks of Canada's leading modernists and along with other members of the Group into the Group of Seven shows as an invited contributor in 1930 and 1931.

Her encounter with the Group ended the artistic isolation of Carr's previous 15 years, leading to one of her most prolific periods, and the creation of many of her most notable works. Through her extensive correspondence with Harris, Carr also became aware of and studied Northern European symbolism.

Carr's artistic direction was influenced by Harris's work and the advice he gave in his correspondence (he told her to seek an equivalent for the totem poles in west coast landscape, for instance), but also by his belief in Theosophy. She was deeply interested and struggled to reconcile this with her own conception of God. Carr's "distrust for institutional religion" pervades much of her art. She thought a great deal about Theosophic thought, like many artists of the time, but in the end, remained unconvinced.

== Influence of the Pacific Northwest school ==
In 1924 and 1925, Carr exhibited at the Artists of the Pacific Northwest shows in Seattle, Washington. She invited fellow exhibitor Mark Tobey to visit her in Victoria in the autumn of 1928 to teach a master class in her studio. Working with Tobey, Carr furthered her understanding of modern art, experimenting with Tobey's methods of full-on abstraction and Cubism, but she was reluctant to follow Tobey beyond the legacy of Cubism.

I was not ready for abstraction. I clung to earth and her dear shapes, her density, her herbage, her juice. I wanted her volume and I wanted to hear her throb.

Although Carr expressed reluctance about abstraction, Doris Shadbolt at the Vancouver Art Gallery, a major curator of Carr's work, records Carr in this period as abandoning the documentary impulse and starting to concentrate instead on capturing the emotional and mythological content embedded in the totemic carvings. She jettisoned her painterly and practiced Post-Impressionist style in favour of creating highly stylized and abstracted geometric forms.

== Later developments ==
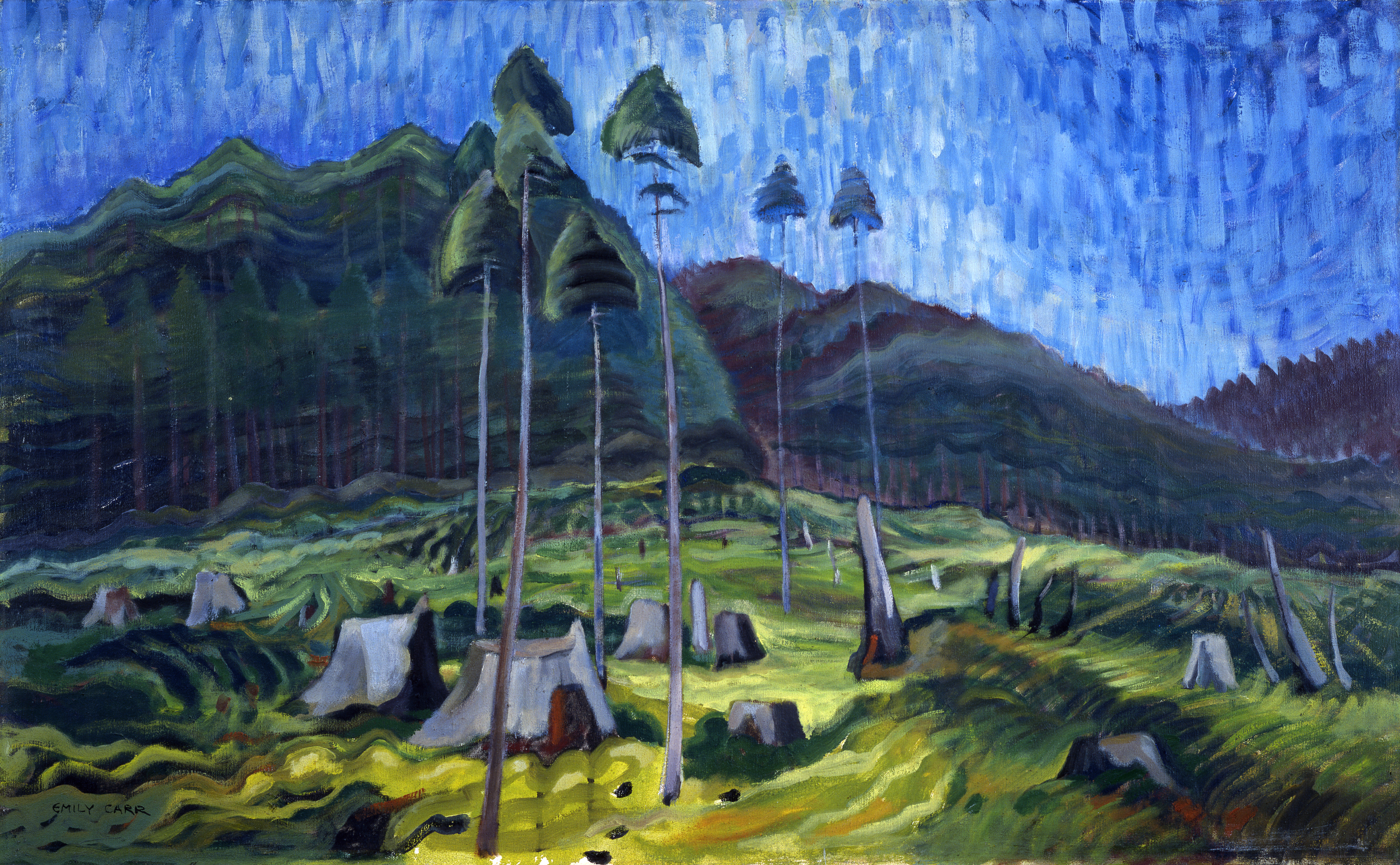
Odds and Ends, 1939

Carr continued to travel throughout the late 1920s and 1930s away from Victoria. One of her last trips north was in the summer of 1928, when she visited the Nass and Skeena rivers, as well as Haida Gwaii, formerly known as the Queen Charlotte Islands. She went to Yuquot (also known as Friendly Cove) and the northeast coast of Vancouver Island in 1930, and then to Lillooet in 1933. In the same year she bought a caravan she nicknamed the "Elephant" and had it towed to places she wanted to paint, going to nearby locations such as Goldstream Flats, the Esquimalt Lagoon and elsewhere.

Recognition of her work grew steadily, and in 1930 she exhibited in Ottawa, Victoria and Seattle, and in 1935, Carr's first solo show of her oil on paper works was held in eastern Canada at the Women's Art Association of Canada gallery in Toronto. In 1938 she had her first annual solo exhibition at the Vancouver Art Gallery as well as success at the Tate Gallery in London, England. Other shows abroad followed.

She began to meet other artists. In 1930, for instance, Carr travelled to New York and met Georgia O'Keeffe. In 1933, she was a founding member of the Canadian Group of Painters.

Paintings from Carr's last decade reveal her growing anxiety about the environmental impact of industry on British Columbia's landscape. Her work from this time reflected her growing concern over industrial logging, its ecological effects and its encroachment on the lives of Indigenous people. In her painting Odds and Ends, from 1939 "the cleared land and tree stumps shift the focus from the majestic forestscapes that lured European and American tourists to the West Coast to reveal instead the impact of deforestation."

== Shift of focus and late life ==
Carr suffered her first heart attack in 1937, and another in 1939, forcing her to move in with her sister Alice to recover. In 1940, Carr suffered serious trouble with her heart, and in 1942 she had another heart attack. With her ability to travel curtailed, Carr's focus shifted from her painting to her writing. The editorial assistance of Carr's great friend and literary advisor Ira Dilworth, a professor of English, enabled Carr to see her own first book, Klee Wyck, published in 1941. Carr was awarded the Governor General's Literary Award for non-fiction the same year for the work.

In 1942, Carr established the Emily Carr Trust, and donated close to 170 paintings to the Vancouver Art Gallery. She had the only successful commercial show of her career at the Dominion Gallery in Montreal in 1944. She suffered her last heart attack and died on March 2, 1945, at the James Bay Inn in her hometown of Victoria, British Columbia, shortly before she was to have been awarded an honorary doctorate by the University of British Columbia. Carr is buried at Ross Bay Cemetery.

== Work ==
=== Painting ===
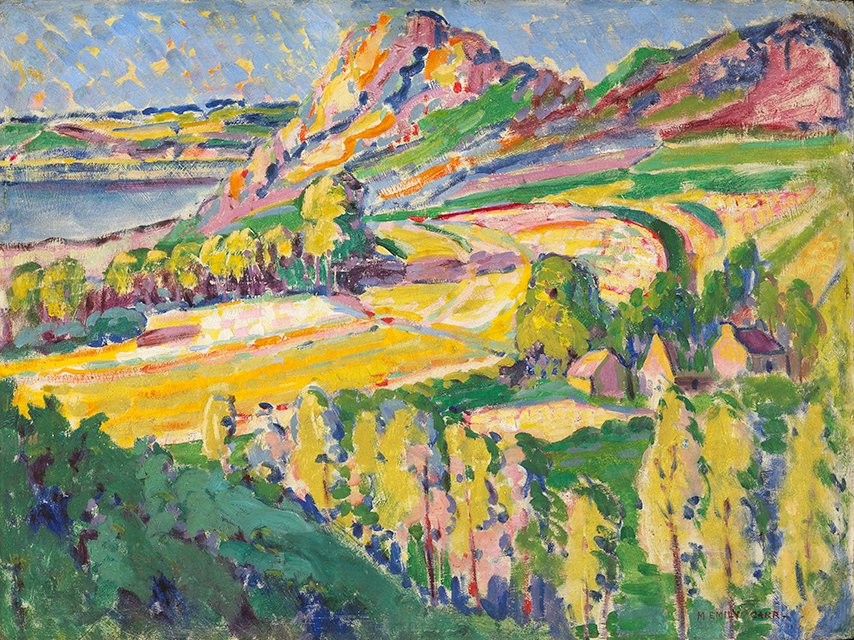
Autumn in France, 1911. National Gallery of Canada

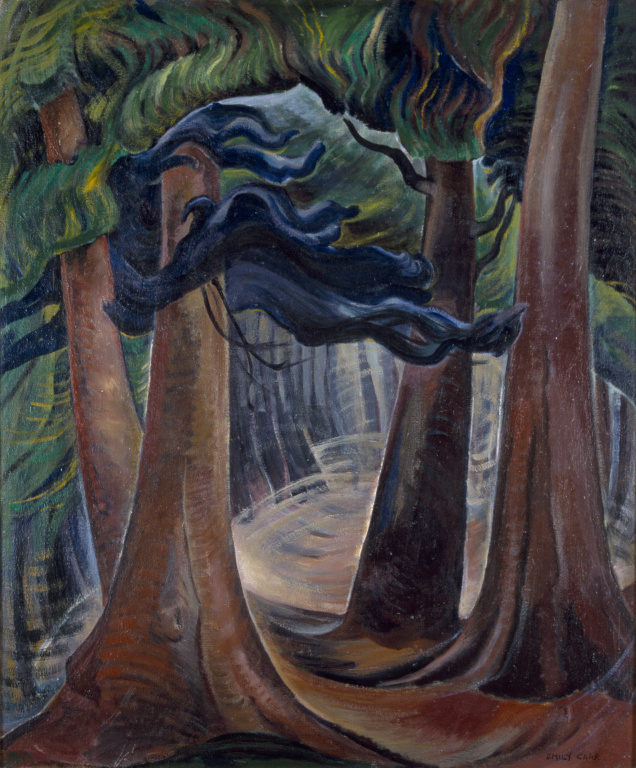
Among the Firs, c. 1931, Glenbow Museum, Calgary

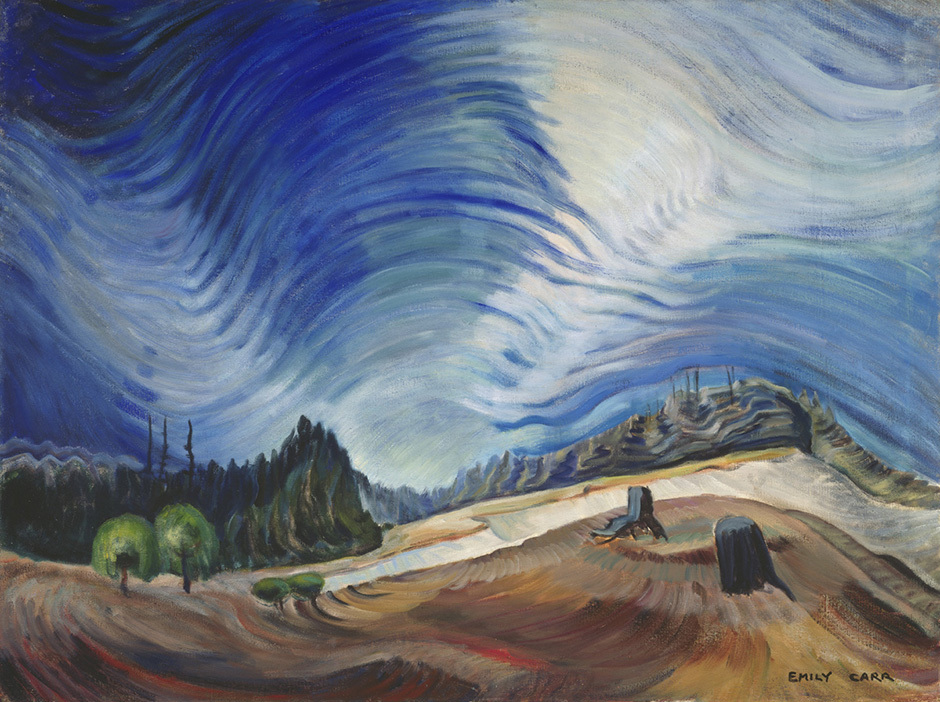
Above the Gravel Pit, 1937

Carr is remembered primarily for her painting. She was one of the artists who attempted to capture the spirit of Canada in a modern style. Carr's main themes in her mature work were the monumental works of the First Nations and nature: "native totem poles set in deep forest locations or sites of abandoned native villages" and, later, "the large rhythms of Western forests, driftwood-tossed beaches and expansive skies". She blended these two themes in ways uniquely her own. Her "qualities of painterly skill and vision [...] enabled her to give form to a Pacific mythos that was so carefully distilled in her imagination".

At the California School of Design in San Francisco, Carr participated in art classes which were focused on a variety of artistic styles. Many of Carr's art professors were trained in the Beaux Arts tradition in Paris, France. Though she took classes in drawing, portraiture, still life, landscape painting, and flower painting, Carr preferred to paint landscapes.

Carr is known for her paintings of First Nations villages and Pacific Northwest Indian totems, but Maria Tippett explained that Carr's depictions of the forests of British Columbia from within make her work unique. Carr constructed a new understanding of Cascadia. This understanding includes a new approach to the presentation of native people and Canadian landscapes.

After visiting the Gitksan village of Kitwancool in the summer of 1928, Carr became captivated by the maternal imagery in Pacific Northwest Indigenous totem poles. After Carr was exposed to these types of images, her paintings reflected these images of mother and child in Native carvings.

Her painting can be divided into several distinct phases: her early work, before her studies in Paris; her early paintings under the Fauvist influence of her time in Paris; a Post Impressionist middle period before her encounter with the Group of Seven; and her later, formal period, under the cubist and post-cubist influences of Lawren Harris and American artist and friend, Mark Tobey. Carr used charcoal and watercolour for her sketches, and beginning in 1932, house paint thinned with gasoline on manila paper. The greatest part of her mature work was oil on canvas or, when money was scarce, oil on paper.

== Legacy ==
Carr's work is still of relevance today to contemporary artists. Her painting Old Time Coast Village (1929–1930) is referred to in Korean Canadian artist Jin-me Yoon's A Group of Sixty-Seven (1996). The work is composed of sixty-seven portraits of the Korean Canadian community in Vancouver standing in front of Old Time Coast Village and a landscape painting by Group of Seven member Lawren Harris. She is the subject of books and articles by authors such as Gerta Moray and many others.

Several musical and theatrical productions have brought Carr's work to life on stage. Examples are Emily Carr-Small Wonders a musical by the Canadiana Musical Theatre Company, Song of this place, and the performances of the Emily Carr String Quartet.

From January 25, 2025 – January 19, 2026, the Vancouver Art Gallery examined her paintings of nature—impenetrable in earlier work, more open in later work—in a show of Carr's paintings from the collection titled Emily Carr: Navigating an Impenetrable Landscape. This was followed by their show That Green Ideal: Emily Carr and the Idea of Nature from February 6 – November 8, 2026; the exhibit examined "the artist's obsession with the landscape of the Pacific Northwest."

== Writings by Carr ==
- Fresh Seeing. Clarke, Irwin and Company, 1972
- Growing Pains. Vancouver: Douglas & McIntyre, 2005;
- Hundreds and Thousands. The Journals of Emily Carr. Vancouver: Douglas & McIntyre, 2006;
- Klee Wyck. Vancouver: Douglas & McIntyre, 2004;
- Pause: A Sketchbook. Vancouver: Douglas & McIntyre, 2007;
- The Book of Small. Vancouver: Douglas & McIntyre, 2004;
- The Heart of a Peacock. Vancouver: Douglas & McIntyre, 2005;
- The House of All Sorts. Vancouver: Douglas & McIntyre, 2004;

== Writing by Carr edited by other authors ==
- Bridge, Kathryn ed. Sister & I From Victoria to London. Victoria: Royal BC Museum, 2011
- Bridge, Kathryn ed. Wildflowers. Victoria: Royal BC Museum, 2000;
- Crean, Susan ed., Opposite Contraries. The Unknown Journals of Emily Carr and other writings Vancouver: Douglas & McIntyre, 2003;
- Morra, Linda ed. Corresponding Influence. Selected Letters of Emily Carr & Ira Dilworth. Toronto: University of Toronto Press, 2006;
- Silcox, David P., ed. Sister & I in Alaska. Vancouver: Figure 1, 2014;
- Switzer, Ann-Lee ed. This and That. The Lost Stories of Emily Carr. Victoria: TouchWood Editions, 2007;
- Walker, Doreen ed. Dear Nan. Letters of Emily Carr, Nan Cheney and Humphrey Toms. Vancouver: UBC Press, 1990.
- Switzer, Ann-Lee ed. This and That: The Lost Stories of Emily Carr; Revised and Updated. Victoria: Touchwood Editions, 2024.

== Biographies of Emily Carr ==
- Baldiserra, Lisa. Emily Carr, Life and Times. Art Canada Institute.
- Bridge, Kathryn ed. Emily Carr in England. Victoria: Royal BC Museum, 2014;
- Hembroff-Schleicher, Edythe. Emily Carr: The Untold Story. Saanichton: Hancock House, 1978;
- Shadbolt, Doris. The Art of Emily Carr. Vancouver: Douglas & McIntyre and Clarke Irwin, 1979.
- Shadbolt, Doris. Emily Carr. Vancouver: Douglas & McIntyre, 1990.
- Shadbolt, Doris. Seven Journeys: The Sketchbooks of Emily Carr. Douglas & McIntyre, 2002.
- Thom, Ian M. and Charles Hill (ed). Emily Carr: New Perspectives on a Canadian Icon. Vancouver and Ottawa: Vancouver Art Gallery and the National Gallery of Canada, 2006.
- Tippett, Maria. Emily Carr. A Biography. Toronto: Oxford University Press, 1979.

== Recognition ==
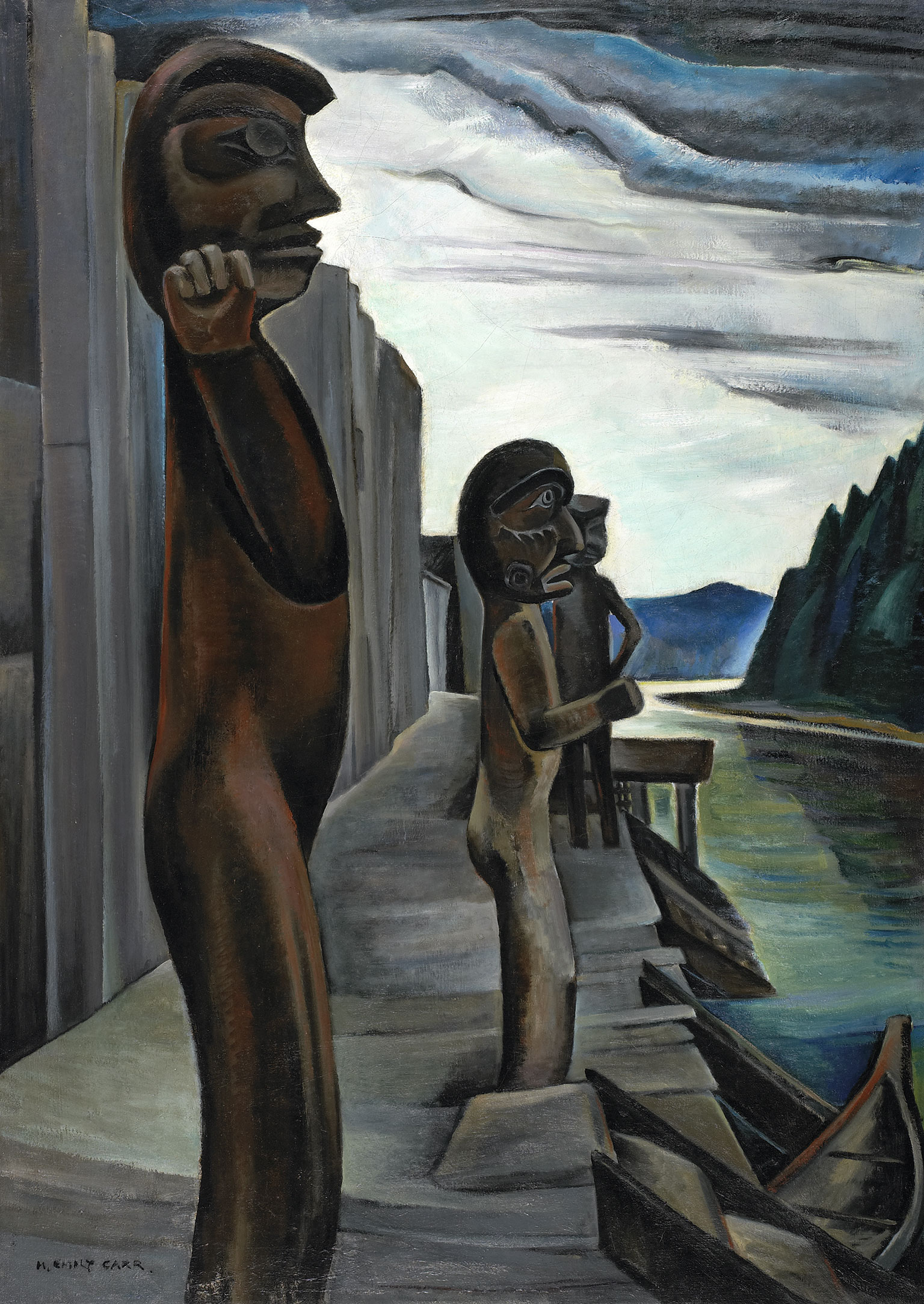
Blunden Harbour, 1930, National Gallery of Canada

Carr's life itself made her a "Canadian icon", according to the Canadian Encyclopedia. As well as being "an artist of stunning originality and strength", she was an exceptionally late bloomer, starting the work for which she is best known at the age of 57 (see Grandma Moses). Carr was also an artist who succeeded against the odds, living in an artistically unadventurous society, and working mostly in seclusion away from major art centres, thus making her "a darling of the women's movement" (like Georgia O'Keeffe, whom she met in 1930 in New York City). Emily Carr brought the north to the south; the west to the east; glimpses of the ancient culture of the Indigenous peoples of the Americas to the most newly arrived Europeans on the continent.

However, art historians who write about Carr in depth often respond to their particular points of view: Feminist studies (Sharyn R. Udall, 2000), First Nations scholarship (Gerta Moray, 2006), or the critical study of what an artist says as a tool to analyze the work itself (Charles C. Hill, Ian M. Thom, 2006).

In 1952, works by Emily Carr along with those of David Milne, Goodridge Roberts and Alfred Pellan represented Canada at the Venice Biennale.

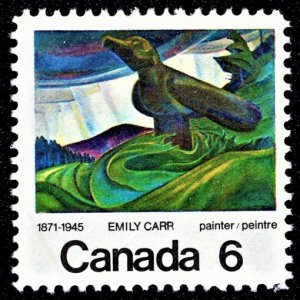
1971 Canada stamp honoring Emily Carr, based on her painting Big Raven

On February 12, 1971, Canada Post issued a 6¢ stamp 'Emily Carr, painter, 1871–1945' designed by William Rueter based on Carr's Big Raven (1931), held by the Vancouver Art Gallery. On May 7, 1991, Canada Post issued a 50¢ stamp 'Forest, British Columbia, Emily Carr, 1931–1932' designed by Pierre-Yves Pelletier based on Forest, British Columbia (1931–1932), also from the Vancouver Art Gallery collection.

In 1978, she was awarded the Royal Canadian Academy of Arts Medal. In 2014, the Art Gallery of Ontario in Toronto and Dulwich Picture Gallery in south London exhibited From the Forest to the Sea: Emily Carr in British Columbia with a book/catalogue edited by Sarah Milroy and Ian Dejardin. It was first time such solo exhibition was held in Britain. In 2020, a travelling exhibition organized by the Audain Art Museum in Whistler, B.C. and co-curated by Kiriko Watanabe and Dr. Kathryn Bridge and titled Emily Carr: Fresh Seeing – French Modernism and the West Coast explored this aspect of Carr's work in detail.

== Record sale prices ==
On November 28, 2013, one of Carr's paintings, The Crazy Stair (The Crooked Staircase), sold for $3.39 million at Heffel's live auction in Toronto. As of the sale, it is a record price for a painting by a Canadian female artist. Heffel has sold the top three most valuable works by Emily Carr ever offered at auction, including "Cordova Drift" for $3,361,250 on December 1, 2021, and "Tossed by the Wind" for $3,121,250 on June 23, 2021. Heffel currently leads the market for sales of works by Emily Carr globally.

At a Cowley Abbott Auction in Toronto, December 1, 2022, Carr's The Totem of the Bear and the Moon (1912, oil on canvas, 37 x 17.75 ins), sold for $3,120,000.

At a Cowley Abbott Auction on December 6, 2023, Carr's Nirvana (oil on paper, mounted on canvas, 35.25 x 20.25 ins), sold for $744,000.

== Institutions named for Carr ==
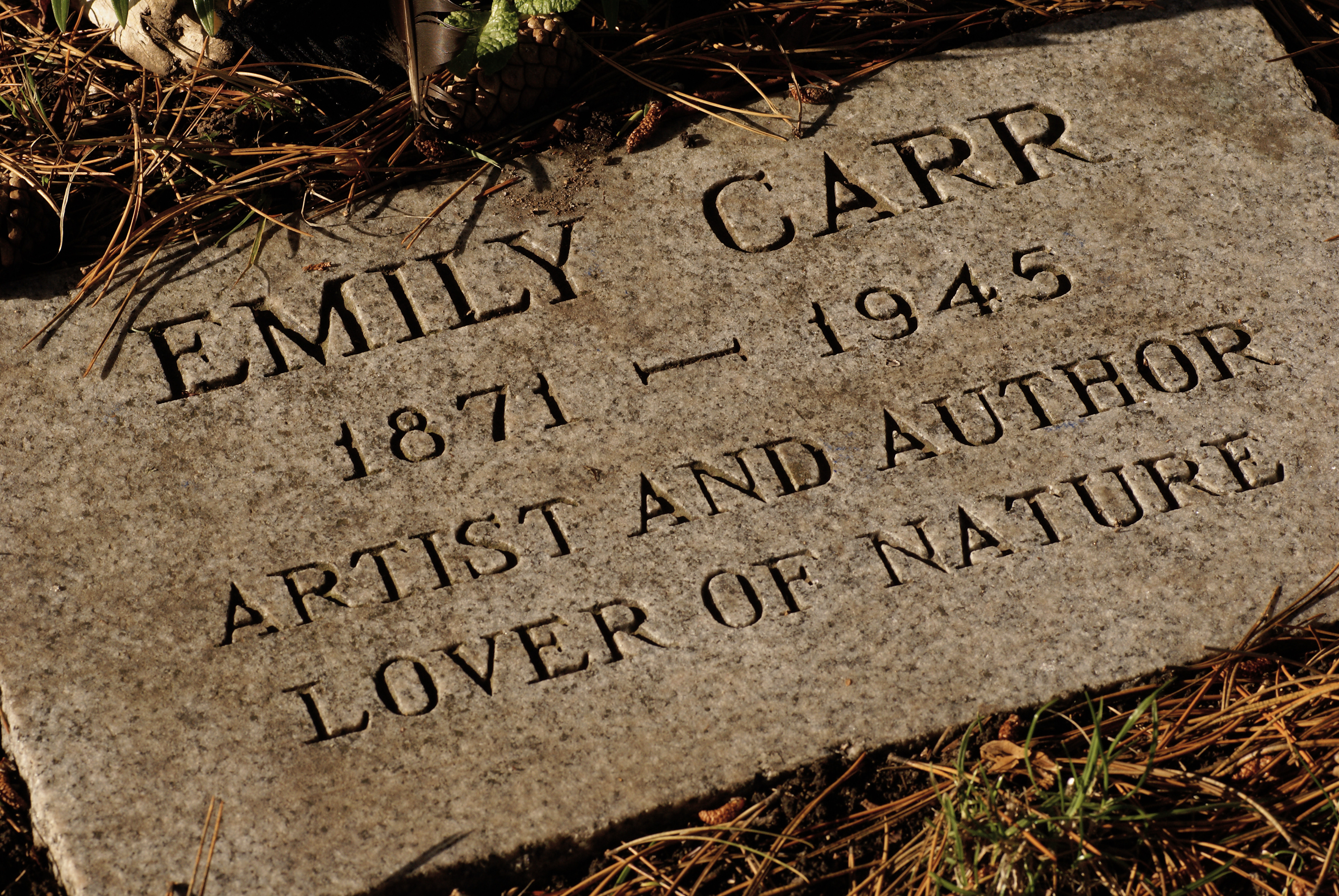
Emily Carr's gravestone, Ross Bay cemetery

- Emily Carr House in Victoria, British Columbia
- Emily Carr University of Art and Design in Vancouver, British Columbia
- Greater Victoria Public Library Emily Carr Branch in Victoria, British Columbia
- Emily Carr Secondary School in Woodbridge, Ontario
- Emily Carr Elementary School in Vancouver, British Columbia
- Emily Carr Middle School in Ottawa, Ontario
- Emily Carr public schools in London, Toronto, Ontario Oakville, Ontario
- In 1994, the Working Group for Planetary System Nomenclature of the International Astronomical Union adopted the name Carr for a crater on Venus. The Carr crater has an approximate diameter of 31.9 kilometers.
- Emily Carr Inlet, an arm of Chapple Inlet on the North Coast of British Columbia

== Archives ==
The British Columbia Archives holds the largest collection of Emily Carr artworks, sketches, and archival materials, which includes the Emily Carr fonds, the Emily Carr Art Collection, and a wealth of archival documents held in the fonds of Carr's friends. There is an Emily Carr fonds at Library and Archives Canada. The archival reference number is R1969, former archival reference number MG30-D215. The fonds covers the date range 1891 to 1991. It consists of 1.764 meters of textual records, 10 photographs, 1 print, 7 drawings. A number of the records have been digitized and are available online. Library and Archives Canada also holds a number of other fonds containing material that touch on Emily Carr. Her artistic and written works are in the public domain.

== See also ==
- Modern art
- List of Canadian artists
