= Molly Lamb Bobak =

Canadian teacher and artist

Molly Lamb Bobak CM ONB RCA
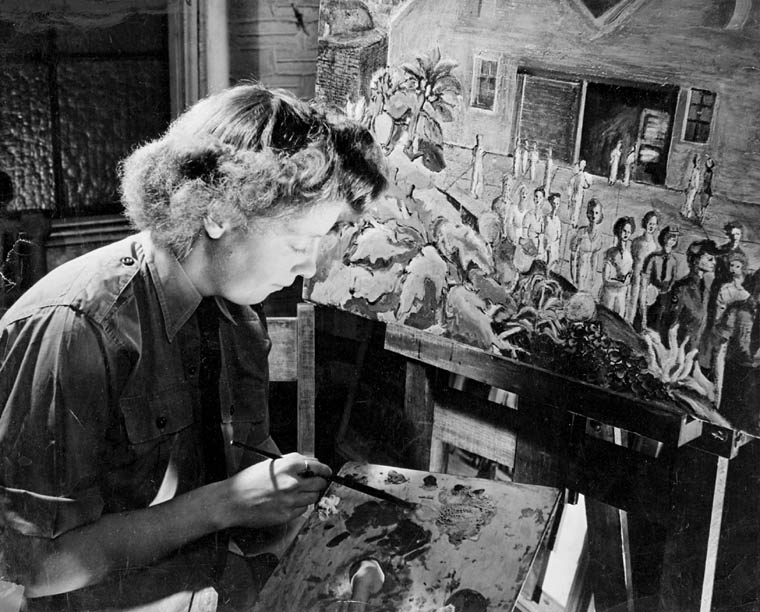
- Born: Molly Lamb; February 25, 1920; Vancouver, British Columbia
- Died: March 2, 2014 (aged 94); Fredericton, New Brunswick
- Known for: Painter, printmaker
- Spouse: Bruno Bobak (m. 1945)

Molly Lamb Bobak CM ONB RCA (née Lamb; February 25, 1920 – March 2, 2014) was a Canadian teacher, writer, printmaker and painter who worked in oils and watercolours. During World War II, she was the first Canadian woman artist to be sent overseas to document Canada's war effort, and in particular, the work of the Canadian Women's Army Corps (C.W.A.C), as one of Canada's war artists.

== Life and career ==
=== Early life ===
Born Molly Lamb, Bobak grew up in Vancouver, British Columbia. Bobak's mother, Mary Williams, initially worked as a housekeeper for Bobak's father, Harold Mortimer-Lamb, when his wife became ill. At some point, her parents decided to move in together along with Mortimer-Lamb's wife and their children. Bobak and her extended family seemed to live happily in this unconventional household.

Mortimer-Lamb was a mining engineer, journalist/art critic and collector who befriended the artists of the Group of Seven, who would visit the family on occasion.

Bobak's reputed poor eyesight and dislike for her teachers left her with poor school marks. Recognizing this, Bobak's mother encouraged her daughter to enroll at the Vancouver School of Art studying with artist Jack Shadbolt, whom she would remain close friends with all her life. Shadbolt enthusiastically encouraged her, and led her to discover European artists such as Cézanne and Matisse. He was a lifelong mentor.

=== World War II ===
The first page from Molly Lamb's WWII diary. "Molly Lamb enters the Army". Hand drawn page from her World War II diary. Dated: November 22, 1942.

Bobak enlisted in the Canadian Women's Army Corps (C.W.A.C) in 1942 and stayed for four years. This was a vast opportunity as it allowed her to travel and gain new skills. She traveled across Canada and after Victory in Europe Day she went to London, England where she met her future husband, artist Bruno Bobak. As part of the C.W.A.C., she was appointed to document training, marching, working and any other contributions to the war.

From the beginning of her army career she kept a diary that provides a unique visual record of the C.W.A.C life during the war that spans from November 1942 to September 1945. Her drawing style and often self-deprecating commentary has a humorous tone and gives the whole diary a comedic tone. In structure, it was made to look like a broadsheet newspaper with handwritten material, and letter to the editor. The diary was originally created as a personal record but A.Y. Jackson felt it demonstrated her potential as a war artist and is now seen as a unique view into a woman's experiences in Second World War army life. It was three years after she enlisted that she was appointed by the Canadian War Artists Selection Committee as Canada's first female official war artist. Some sketches such as "Gas Drill, Vermilion was a preparatory material for her piece Gas Drill (1944) which is now held at the Canadian War Museum.

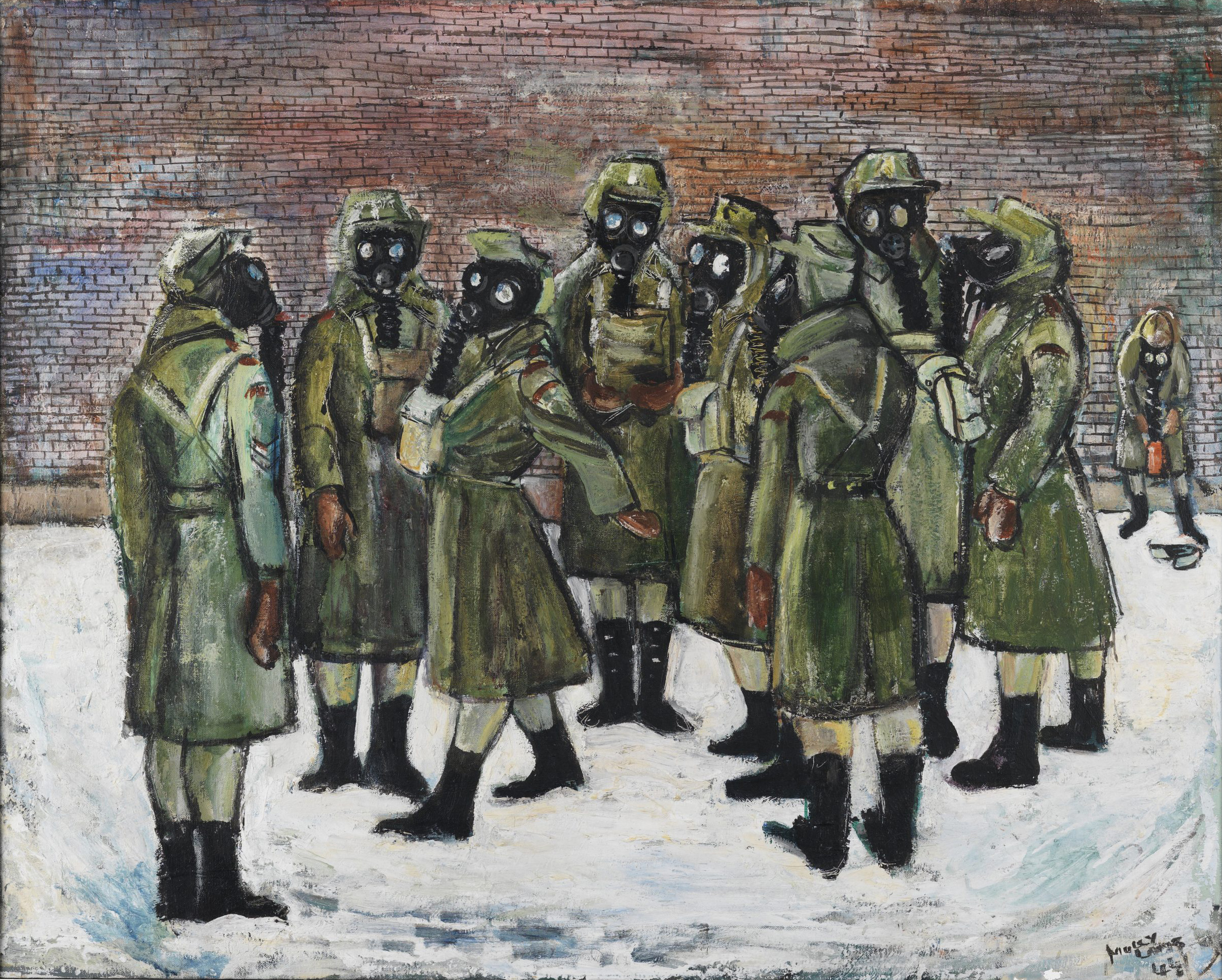
Molly Bobak - Gas Drill (CWM 19710261-1603)

Among the most significant works Bobak created as an Official Second World War artist Private Roy (1946). It is one of the few depictions of Canadian soldiers of colour created as part of the Canadian War Records program. The subject of the portrait is Sergeant Eva May Roy.

In 1992, Dundurn Press published a book titled Double Duty: Sketches and Diaries of Molly Lamb Bobak Canadian War Artist that incorporated her wartime diaries and sketches edited by Carolyn Gossage. What was unique about the diary was that she created it in the form of a newspaper, with headlines, interviews and editorials. In 2015, Library and Archives Canada digitized all 226 pages of the diary and made it available on their website to mark the 70th anniversary of her appointment as Canada's only official woman war artist.

=== Post-war ===
After the end of the war, the Bobaks had a son, Alex, and tried to make a living on the West Coast by painting, teaching, and other various jobs. She painted little during these years, as she was busy looking after her child and teaching painting at night school. However, she met Jacques Maritain, a French Thomist philosopher and Vatican ambassador to the United States. He was impressed with her work, and arranged for her to visit France on a French Government Scholarship.

Alan Jarvis, Director of the National Gallery of Canada was also impressed by her work, and invited her to participate in exhibitions such as the Sao Paulo Biennial and the Vancouver Art Gallery's Third Canadian Biennial in 1960. Through these exhibitions, she was able to enjoy increasing financial success and popularity.

She was among the first generation of Canadian women artists to work professionally and earn a living from their art.

=== Life in Fredericton ===
After spending four years in Europe with money from the Canada Council, Bruno was offered a position teaching at the University of New Brunswick in Fredericton, New Brunswick. Bruno and Molly settled in Fredericton, where she continued to live.

In 1973, she was elected to the Royal Canadian Academy of Arts and in 1993, the MacKenzie Art Gallery in Regina, Saskatchewan organized a major touring retrospective of her work.

Bobak is now most widely recognized for her depictions of crowds of people, always dynamic, and her work from World War II. Her paintings of crowded scenes serve to record public events and visual experiences of large numbers of people sharing the same space, time and celebration. However, she denies that they are purely records or memorials of events and not social and psychological investigations. They remain for Bobak, an aesthetic challenge because of their dynamic constantly changing rhythm.

== Collections ==
Bobak's work is included in the collections of the National Gallery of Canada and the Musée national des beaux-arts du Québec. Library and Archives Canada holds the Molly Lamb Bobak and Bruno Bobak fonds. The archive contains their personal records including prints (woodcut, serigraph, and wood engraving), drawings, watercolours, photographs and 2.3 meters of textual records.

== Awards and honours ==
- Canadian Army Art Competition, 1944.
- First prize, Graphic Art Society, 1966.
- French Government scholarship for study in France, 1950–51.
- Canada Council fellowship for study in Europe, 1960–61.
- Order of Canada, 1995.
- Order of New Brunswick, 2002.

== Death ==
Bobak died March 2, 2014. There were 32 official war artists in World War II and she was the last surviving member.

== See also ==
- Canadian official war artists
- War artist
- Military art
