= Klee Wyck =

Memoir by Emily Carr

Cover of the 1941 edition

Klee Wyck (1941) is a memoir by Canadian artist Emily Carr. Through short sketches, the artist tells of her experiences among First Nations people and cultures on British Columbia's west coast. The book won the 1941 Governor General's Award and occupies an important place in Canadian literature.

== Background ==
Emily Carr (1871–1945) is one of western Canada's most well-known artists. Born in Victoria, British Columbia, she painted themes from nature, as well as imagery from the cultures of west coast First Nations. In her late sixties, Carr turned to writing. After Klee Wyck, she published six additional collections of autobiographical sketches.

Carr was an avid traveller, and explored much of the west coast of British Columbia in her lifetime. She related some of her experiences on western Vancouver Island, Haida Gwaii, and on the Skeena and Nass Rivers in this first book. Other essays relate to her time living in Vancouver, where she worked as a painter and art teacher.

In 1937, Carr suffered a heart attack. After this, she turned away from painting and began a prolific period of memoir writing. Much of Klee Wyck was composed as she recovered in bed. The original, unpublished title for the book was Stories in Cedar. Carr instead chose Klee Wyck, a nickname given to her by the First Nations people of Ucluelet. It means "Laughing One".

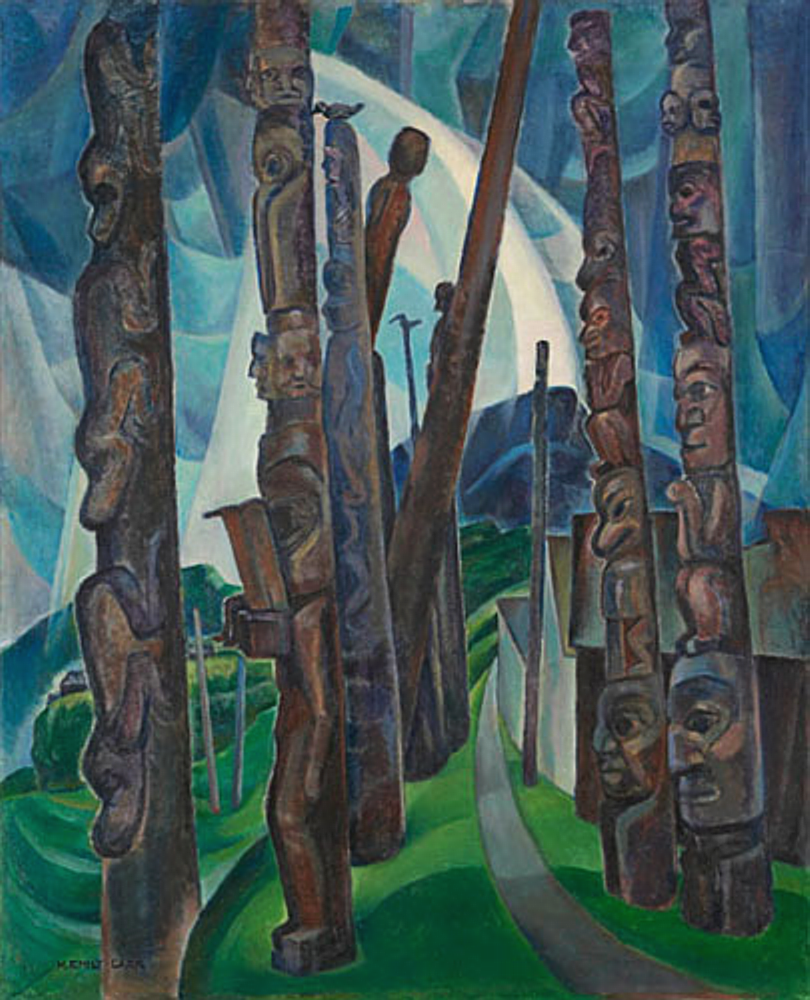
Carr's painting Kitwancool (1928)

== Publication history ==
Originally published by the Oxford University Press' Toronto division in 1941, the book was abridged by 2,300 words for the 1951 Clarke, Irwin & Company edition. Removed were several passages critical of the actions of European missionaries, as well as an account of a mixed race family. This version was the basis for all editions of the book until Douglas & McIntyre's 2004 edition restored the text. The original edition also featured four colour plates of Carr's paintings, including a portrait of Sophie Frank. The original foreword was by Ira Dilworth. A French translation was published in 1973.
