= Mia Arnesby Brown =

Welsh artist

- Born: 1867; Monmouth
- Died: 1931 (aged 63–64)
- Education: Professor Herkomer at Bushey
- Known for: Portrait and figure painting

Mia Arnesby Brown, née Mia Edwards (1867–1931) was a Welsh painter. She was particularly noted for her portraits of children.

== Biography ==
Mia Sarah H. Edwards was born in Cwmbran, Monmouthshire, daughter of Rev. Charles Smallwood Edwards and paternal granddaughter of Rev. Loderwick Edwards, who had been the Vicar of Rhymney. She studied under Sir Hubert von Herkomer at Bushey. In 1894, she exhibited at the Nottingham Castle Exhibition of Cornish Painters as Mia Edwards. She showed at least five pieces at the Royal Cambrian Academy of Art under her maiden name.

In 1896, she married John Arnesby Brown. The couple spent the summer and autumn months in Norfolk and the winter and spring in St Ives, Cornwall. St. Ives was the home of an artists' colony, whose painters participated in the Newlyn School of Open Air Art. She often showcased her works featuring children with the likes of Marianne Stokes and Elizabeth Forbes. One of her best-known works was a portrait of a daughter of the novelist Charles Marriott. In 1906 her piece, Shirley Poppies, was exhibited at the Royal Academy of Arts in London and in a 1913 exhibit of Welsh artists, she gained acclaim for Mary Reading and The Garden Boy. Amgueddfa Cymru – Museum Wales houses The Garden Boy in its collections. She also has three paintings housed at the Norfolk Museums, Norwich: Girl Fishing (1918), Sleeping Girl (1931) and Thomas South Mack as a Small Boy (undated). Her work, Country Girl, is part of the collection of Leamington Spa Art Gallery.

Eventually, the couple settled in the village of Haddiscoe, Norfolk, where Mia Arnsby Brown died suddenly in 1931.

== Exhibitions ==
- 1894 Nottingham Castle, Exhibition of Cornish Painters (as Mia Edwards)
