= Kathryn Bridge =

Canadian writer, curator, archivist, historian (born 1955)

- Born: 1955; Victoria, British Columbia
- Education: BA in Art History, University of Victoria (1977); MA in History, University of Victoria (1984). Ph.D, University of Victoria (2012)
- Known for: writer, curator, archivist, historian
- Spouse: Kevin Neary

Kathryn Bridge (born in 1955) is a Canadian writer, curator, archivist and historian who lives in Victoria, B.C. In 1978, she began to work at the British Columbia Archives (now called the Royal British Columbia Museum (RBCM)) where from 2012 to 2015 she was a Deputy Director. In 2017, she retired and was honoured as Curator Emerita.

Bridge has made and is still making an important contribution to writing and curating exhibitions about British Columbia's history and artists, particularly about its best-known painter Emily Carr. Her writing about Carr and editing of Carr in her many publications on Carr has been called by her peers "superb". She specializes as well in the history of Canada, with monographs on pioneering women, and the First Nations; and western artists including Sophie Pemberton. As an independent curator and writer, her emphasis is on Canadian women’s history and art history, as well as children and childhood in 19th century western Canada.

== Biography ==
Bridge was born and grew up in Victoria, B.C. She received her BA in Art History, an MA in History (1984) and her PhD (2012) from the University of Victoria (UVic). From 1978 to 1997, she served as Archivist at the British Columbia Archives (BC Archives), as Manager, BC Archives (now Royal British Columbia Museum (RCBM)) (1997-2012), and Manager, Access Initiatives, RCBM (2010-2012), as well as Curator of History and Art, RBCM (2015-2017) and a Deputy Director and Head of Knowledge and Academic Relations (2012-2015). From 2014 to 2017, she served as an Executive team member for UVic's Landscapes of Injustice project, a 7-year Social Science and Humanities Research Council funded Partnership Grant which focusses on the dispossession of Japanese Canadians during the Second World War. She was made a member of the Adjunct Faculty, Department of History, UVic. In 2015. In 2017, she retired from the RBCM to work as an independent curator and historian and was appointed Curator Emerita.

== Curating and writing ==
Bridge curated Emily Carr: Artist, Author, Eccentric, Genius (RBCM, 2000) which the Globe and Mail said gave Carr the "royal treatment", The Other Emily: Redefining Emily Carr in which Bridge paired paintings by the contemporary portrait artist Manon Elder with the work of Emily Carr (RBCM, 2011) (RBCM made a documentary about it) and Unexpected: the life and art of Sophie Pemberton (1869-1959) (Art Gallery of Greater Victoria, (2023)) about which she said:

"Unexpected is learning about a significant Canadian artist in our midst whose actions we now see as inspirational, who with a few others, led the way for Canadian women artists overseas, challenging gender barriers within the profession".

She co-curated Emily Carr: Fresh Seeing. Modernism and the West (Audain Art Museum, 2018) as well as compiling a draft catalogue raisonné for the Emily Carr material in the RBCM/ BC Archives. Bridge's many publications (she is called "prolific") are thoughtfully written and cast new light on their subjects. She said of one of her many books on Carr, "Emily Carr in London, 1899-1904":

"My motivation in writing this book was to flesh out these years and to use today's technologies-websites and digitized archival records-to learn the true identities of people she made anonymous in her writings through the use of fictional names.... I was able to make connections and decipher identities, to create a much more accurate chronology of her whereabouts and interactions, and to make connections between Carr and her peers."

At the RBCM, she served as lead or team member for many other exhibitions such as El Dorado: Gold Rush in British Columbia (2015) as well as giving talks and writing papers on a variety of subjects, including "Emily Carr in England" and at a symposium opening the international exhibition of Emily Carr: From the Forest to the Sea, at the Dulwich Picture Gallery, London UK (2014).

In 2023, she wrote Sophie Pemberton: Life & Work for the Art Institute of Canada, available online as well as UNEXPECTED: The Life and Art of Sophie Pemberton (published 2025).

== Selected publications ==
- Henry & Self, the Private Life of Sarah Crease, 1826 - 1922, Sono Nis Press, 1996. Second edition published by Royal BC Museum, 2019.
- By Snowshoe, Buckboard & Steamer: Women of the Frontier, Sono Nis Press, 1998.
- The Lost Klee Wyck, introduction to Emily Carr, Klee Wyck, Douglas & McIntyre, Vancouver and Toronto, 2004.
- Extraordinary Accounts of Native Life on the West Coast; Words From The Huu-ay-aht Ancestors, Altitude Publishing, Canmore, Alberta, 2004.
- A Passion for Mountains: the Lives of Don and Phyllis Munday, Rocky Mountain Books, Calgary, Alberta, 2006.
- Foreword and afterword for Wildflowers by Emily Carr, Royal BC Museum, Victoria, 2007.
- Foreword and afterword for Sister & I: From Victoria to London by Emily Carr, Royal BC Museum, Victoria, 2011.
- With Kevin Neary, Voices of the Elders: Huu-ay-aht Histories and Legends, Heritage House, Victoria, 2013.
- Emily Carr in England, 1899-1904, Royal BC Museum, Victoria, 2014.
- 'Everyone Said Paris Was the Top of Art': Emily Carr’s French Journey to Modernism, in Fresh Seeing. French Modernism and the West Coast, Figure.1 Publishing, Vancouver and Audain Art Museum, Whistler, 2019.
- Preface, Introductory Essay and annotations for Unvarnished. Autobiographical Sketches by Emily Carr, Royal BC Museum, 2021.
- Sophie Pemberton: Life & Work (2023) for the Art Canada Institute, available online.
- Bridge, Kathryn (2025). UNEXPECTED: The Life and Art of Sophie Pemberton. Victoria, BC: Art Gallery of Greater Victoria. ISBN 9780888853882.

== Awards ==
- B.C. Lieutenant Governor’s Medal for Historical Writing, 1998.
- Runner-up VanCity Book Prize, 1999.
- Finalist Banff Mountain Book Festival, 2002 in two categories; Mountain Literature Award and Rocky Mountain Book Award.
- Honorable Mention for Historical Writing, BC Historical Federation, 2002.
- Runner-up for the VanCity Book Prize, 2003.
- Recipient, SSHRC Canadian Graduate Student Doctoral Scholarship, 2006–2009.
