= John Arnesby Brown =

English footballer and painter (1866-1955)

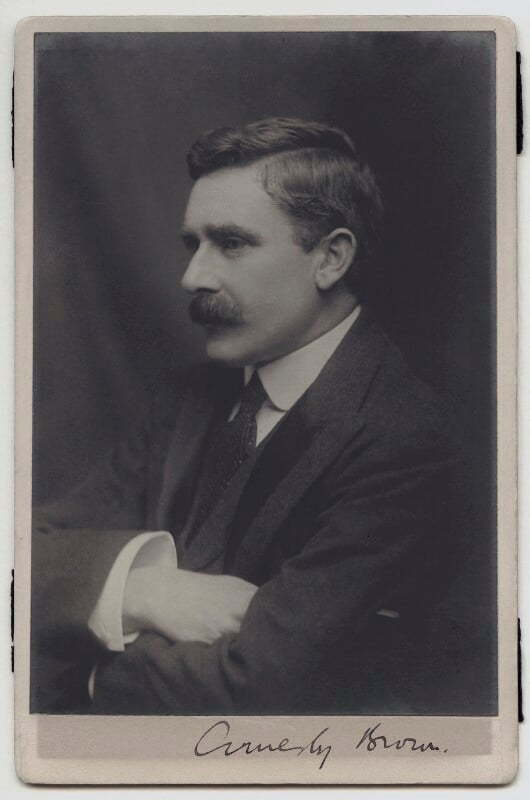
- Brown in the 1900s

Personal information
- Full name: John Alfred Arnesby Brown
- Date of birth: 29 March 1866
- Place of birth: Nottingham, England
- Date of death: 16 November 1955 (aged 89)
- Place of death: Norfolk, England
- Position: Forward

Senior career*
Years	Team	Apps	(Gls)
1888–1889	Notts County	1	(0)
- * Club domestic league appearances and goals

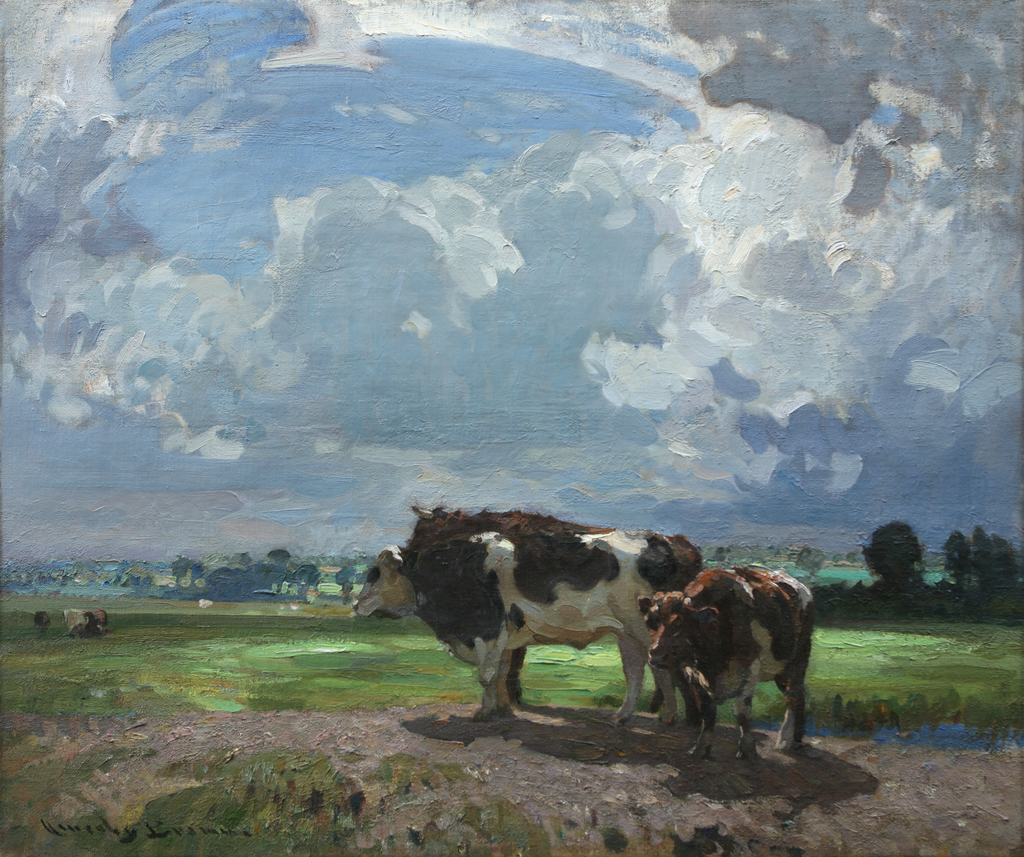
A Summer Day (1912)

Sir John Alfred Arnesby Brown RA (29 March 1866 in Nottingham – 16 November 1955 in Haddiscoe, Norfolk) was an English footballer and landscape artist who came to be known as "one of the leading British landscape artists of the 20th century". He played in The Football League for Notts County, his only appearance coming in a heavy 9–1 defeat to Aston Villa in September 1888. As a landscape artist, he was best known for his impressionistic depictions of pastoral landscapes, often featuring cattle; for his achievements in this field, he was knighted in 1938.

== Early life and football career ==
Brown "received his education at Nottingham High School" and took his first art lessons under a local tutor.

Associated with Notts County as a footballer for five years prior to their Football League entry, Brown had been a regular until mid–season 1887–88. In this campaign his record of ten goals in 14 friendly matches included two separate instances of four goals in a match against Leek and Aston Villa, both in October 1887.

He was rather less successful when he made his sole appearance in a Football League match. This was against Aston Villa at Wellington Road on 29 September 1888, Brown playing on the wing. Reported to have made "An even worse exhibition than usual," the Magpies were four goals in arrears at half–time. They pulled one back – through an own goal – but then "never had another look in" as Villa added a further five. The 9–1 score–line still remains on the record books as Notts' worst Football league defeat.

Brown made four appearances for Notts County (one League and three FA Cup) and scored one FA Cup goal.

== Art career and later life ==
In 1886, Brown married Mia Edwards (1870–1931), also a painter, who had studied under Hubert von Herkomer at the Bushey School of Art in London. Brown himself studied at Bushey for four years from 1889, and at the Nottingham School of Art in the late 1890s. After exhibiting at the Royal Academy for the first time in 1890, he became an elected Associate there in 1903.

Brown was knighted in 1938. He has been called "the artist Nottingham forgot", with little remaining reference to him in Nottingham.

== Personal life and death ==
Brown and Mia lived in Norfolk and St Ives, Cornwall. Mia "died suddenly in 1931", and Brown ceased painting in 1942 due to encroaching blindness, which became total by 1948. Brown lived a very long life, dying in 1955 at the age of 89 in the County of Norfolk in Eastern England. In his latter years he lived in Haddiscoe, Norfolk and did a number of paintings of the local church, a fine example of which hangs in the Castle Museum, Norwich, with several of his other paintings. In 1931, he commissioned the beautiful stained-glass window which can be see in the Haddiscoe church, dedicated to his wife, Mia.

His brother Eric Brown (1877–1939) was the first director of the National Gallery of Canada, from 1912 to 1939.
