= John Vanderpant =

Canadian photographer (1884-1939)

- Born: Jan van der Pant; January 11, 1884; Alkmaar, Netherlands
- Died: July 24, 1939 (aged 55); Vancouver, British Columbia
- Education: University of Amsterdam; Leiden University
- Movement: Modernist photography
- Spouse: Catharina over de Linden (m. 1911)
- Elected: Royal Photographic Society Fellow (1926)

John Vanderpant (January 11, 1884 – July 24, 1939) was a Dutch-Canadian photographer, gallery owner and author. He made his living doing portrait work while becoming known as a major member of the International Modernist photography movement in Canada. He was a key figure in Vancouver's artistic community.

== Personal life and early career ==
Born Jan van der Pant on January 11, 1884, Vanderpant grew up in Alkmaar. Although expected to take over his father's tobacconist business, Vanderpant developed artistic passions especially those related to music and literature. From 1905 to 1912, he studied at the University of Amsterdam and Leiden University. He also published a few poems in Dutch literary journals and in 1908 published his only book of poetry, "Verzen" [Verses]. His short story, Haar Verdriet was published in 1908 and in January of that year the journal Nederland in Riip published Vanderpant's first photograph: a winter image. In 1910, while still registered with the University of Leiden, Vanderpant started working as a photojournalist for the magazine Op de Hoogte [Well Informed]. Until 1913, he published photo-illustrated articles on Italy, Portugal, Holland, and Canada.

On July 6, 1911, Vanderpant married Catharina over de Linden. She eventually became a Christian Scientist and her beliefs were a major influence on her husband. They immigrated to Canada in 1911, and Vanderpant published several articles in Dutch newspapers and magazines on Canada as a possible new homeland for Dutch farmers. In 1912, the Canadian government hired Vanderpant to lecture to Dutch audiences on Canadian immigration. Vanderpant and Catharina settled in Okotoks, Alberta, in 1912 where he opened a photographic studio. In 1916, they moved to Fort Macleod and opened another studio while maintaining the one in Okotoks. Eventually, he opened a third studio in Pincher Creek.

In 1913, the Vanderpants had three children between 1913 and 1917: Anna (1913), John (1915) and Catharina (1917). John died from influenza while still an infant. In 1919, John and Catharina Vanderpant and their two daughters relocated to British Columbia. They settled in New Westminster, where Vanderpant operated a successful portrait business.

== Life and career in British Columbia ==
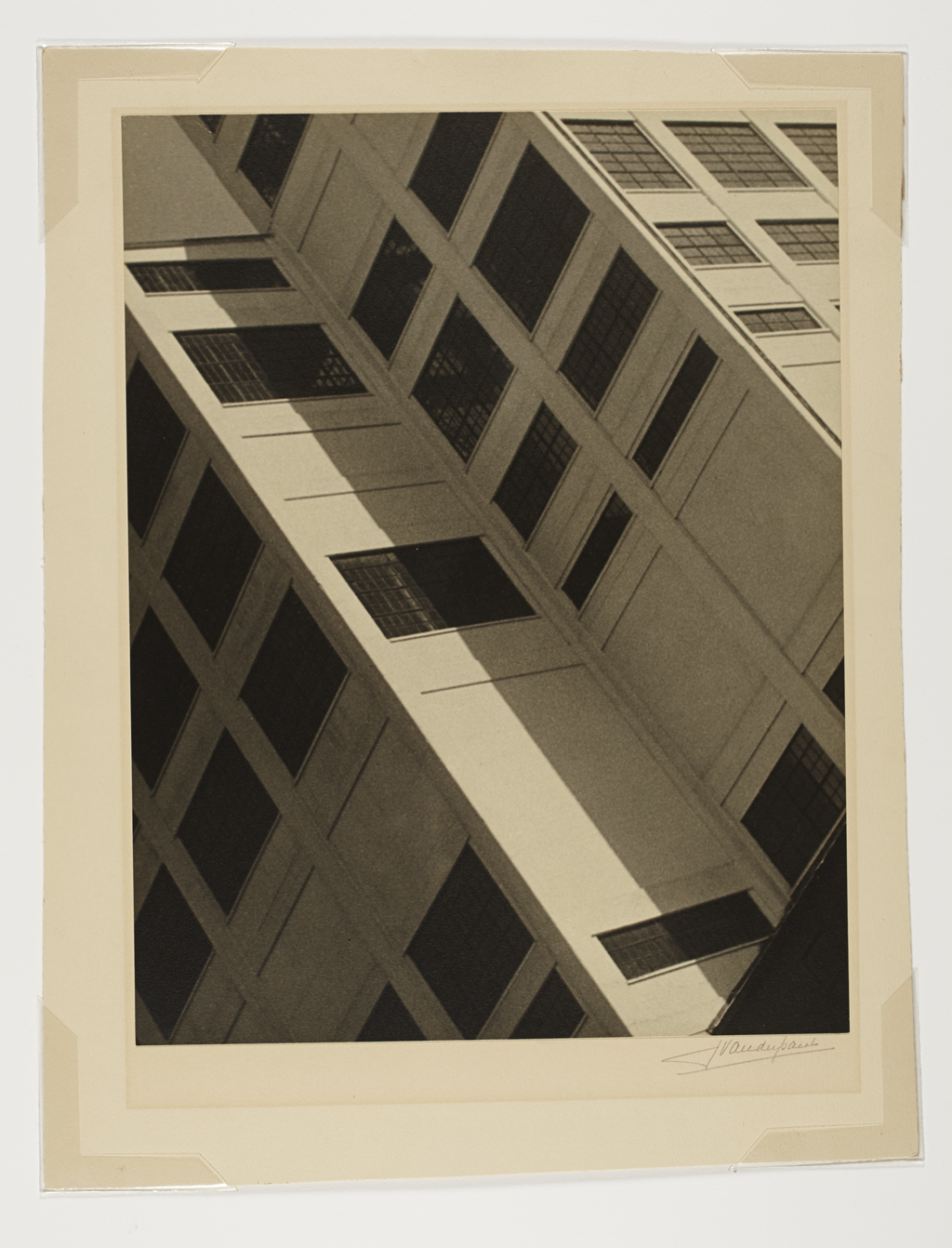
Window Patterns (1920s-1930s). Silver bromide print. From the Art Gallery of Ontario collection.

In 1921, Vanderpant befriended the Victoria Pictorialist, Harry Upperton Knight. The two men visited Emily Carr in 1933 and Knight photographed Carr and Vanderpant in her studio. In 1924, Vanderpant met and befriended the restaurateur and amateur photographer, Johan Helders. Both used a silver bromide printing process and Kodak paper, P.M.C. No. 8. Vanderpant's portrait work reflected a Pictorialist influence; the artist often used soft-focus lenses to craft evocative images of his subjects. Little of Helders' work survives, but a portrait of Yousef Karsh is among his most known prints.

Vanderpant became an active participant in international salons, winning several awards, certificates, and medals. His work conveyed the arresting effects of light and shadow, textures, and compositions. In 1920, he founded the New Westminster Photographic Salon as part of the Fine Arts Gallery of the British Columbia Annual Provincial Exhibition. At one point, that salon exhibited 1,400 prints from 23 countries. From 1923 to 1929, Vanderpant hosted the New Westminster Salon of Pictorial Photography (the only international salon in Western Canada during the 1920s). In addition, he promoted the exhibitions of art by British Columbian and Canadian artists, including the now famous Group of Seven. Vanderpant eventually became disillusioned with photographic salons and ended his participation. In 1924, the San Francisco Museum of Art purchased Vanderpant's print Window Patterns. The next year, he had a one-man show of his prints at the Royal Photographic Society in London, England. From 1925 to 1934, solo exhibitions of his work toured Canada, the United States, and Europe.

In 1926, Vanderpant went into partnership with Harold Mortimer-Lamb (a mining engineer, photographer, painter and journalist) and on March 26, 1928, they opened the Vanderpant Galleries at 1216 Robson Street in Vancouver, British Columbia (the partnership ended in 1929). Under Vanderpant's influence, the gallery became a centre of art, music, and poetry in Vancouver. Members of the Vancouver Poetry Society often held meetings and readings at the Galleries as well as several galas; students from the Vancouver School of Decorative and Applied Arts, the BC College of Arts, and the music faculty from the University of British Columbia attended musical evenings to listen to imported symphonic music played on Vanderpant's Columbia gramophone. Painters such as Emily Carr, A. Y. Jackson, Jock Macdonald, Max Maynard, Frederick Varley, and W. P. Weston exhibited at the Galleries. Moreover, in 1931, Vanderpant exhibited what is likely the first Canadian showing of prints by the American photographers Imogen Cunningham and Edward Weston. Both appreciated Vanderpant's photography, and Weston stated that Vanderpant's work had "imagination, form, -- vitality".

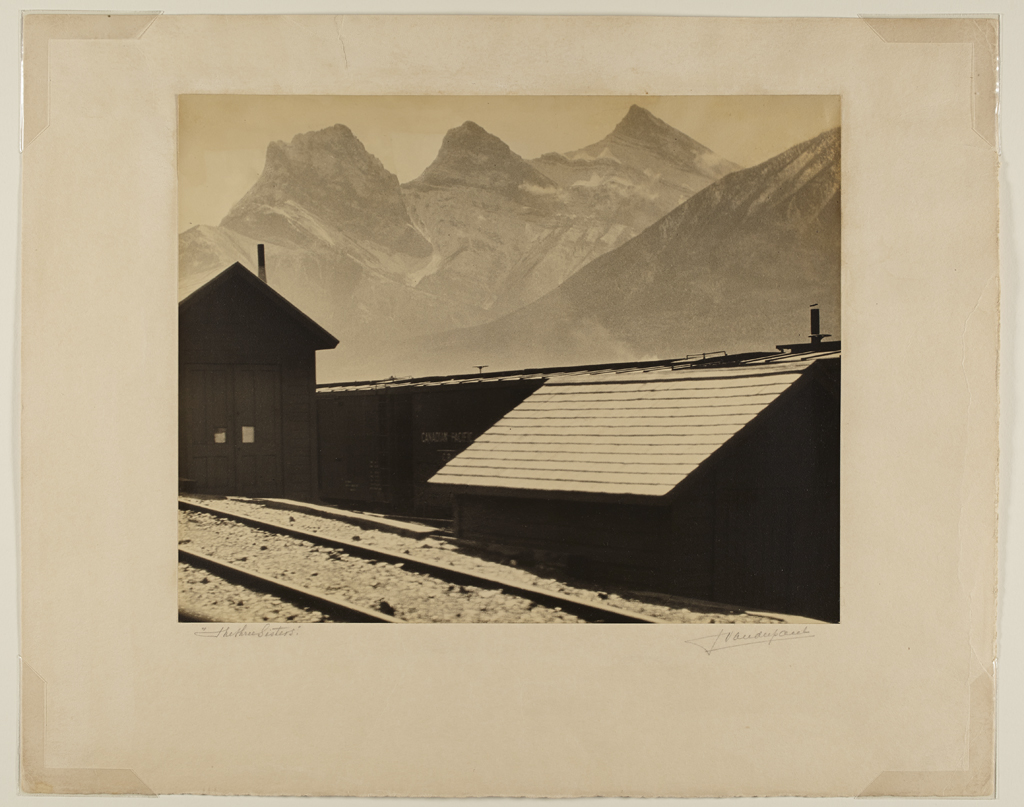
Three Sisters (1920s–1930s). Silver bromide print. From the Art Gallery of Ontario collection.

While Vanderpant started as a pictorialist, his work moved from soft focus and romanticized images to more modernist compositions. However, he was never adverse to dodging, cropping, or enlarging; nor did he totally abandon soft focus. During the mid-1920s he began photographing grain elevators with his 6 ½ x 9 cm. Ansco camera with an f/63 anastigmatic lens. In 1929, he toured Central Canada and had a solo exhibition at the Royal York Hotel in Toronto and one at the Chateau Laurier in Ottawa. His photography became more experimental and modernist — a notable example is his photograph Temples of Today, c.1934, a stark image of towering grain elevators. Since the 1920s, Vanderpant's images of grain elevators have uniquely represented "Canadian industrial architecture". Close-ups of fruits and vegetables were also a way "to emphasize the rhythm and beauty of design in . . . nature's architecture". In 1930, he undertook a commission for the Canadian Pacific Railway, traveling from Vancouver to Quebec. His images of Canadian architecture from this commission have been characterized as building an image of the nation as dynamic, industrializing, and modern. In 1932, Vanderpant had a solo exhibition at the Vancouver Art Gallery that demonstrated his fascination with the beauty found in everyday items such as wrapping paper, light bulbs, stacks of dishes or books, or blocks of wood.

The economic difficulties of the Depression affected Vanderpant's business and health, and he ceased making photographs around 1937. Vanderpant died of lung-cancer in Vancouver in 1939, at age fifty-five, leaving behind his studio and an extensive legacy of work.

== Recognition ==
In 1926, Vanderpant was honoured by being named a Fellow of the Royal Photographic Society of Great Britain, in London. In 1934, he was the first Vancouver artist to have an individual showing at the Seattle Art Museum. The Vancouver Art Gallery held displays of his prints in 1932 and 1937 and a retrospective in 1940. In 1976, the National Gallery of Canada sponsored an exhibition of his work that travelled across the country. Vanderpant's work is now in the collections of Library and Archives Canada, Ottawa; the National Gallery of Canada, Ottawa, the Art Gallery of Ontario; Toronto; Leiden University, The Netherlands; the Los Angeles County Museum of Art, Los Angeles, California; the New Westminster Historic Centre and Museum, New Westminster, British Columbia; the Rijksmuseum, Amsterdam; and the Vancouver Art Gallery.
