= Edith Carr =

China painter and sister of Emily Carr (b. 1856, d. 1919)

- Born: February 5, 1856; California, United States
- Died: December 11, 1919 (aged 63); Victoria, British Columbia
- Known for: First President of the Victoria YWCA

Edith Carr (February 5, 1856 - December 11, 1919) was an American-Canadian China-painter and founder of the YWCA in Victoria, British Columbia. Most notably, she was the elder sister of Canadian artist Emily Carr. While Edith's artistry never received the same level of recognition as her sister, she won several awards for her donations to non-profit religious organizations. Carr raised the funds she would later donate by selling her painted ceramic pieces at Christmas bazaars.

== Early life and family ==
Edith "Dede" Carr was born on February 5, 1856, in California and was the first child of Richard and Emily (née Saunders) Carr (July 16, 1818 - November 20, 1888) (July 3, 1836 - September 22, 1886). In 1863, the family moved to Victoria, British Columbia in Canada. She was the eldest of eight children, three of whom died as infants. Of the eight, only one, Clara ("Tallie") went on to marry and have children. Edith Carr spent her young life taking care of her tuberculosis ridden mother and raising her siblings, becoming their guardian. When both parents died in the late 1880s, Carr became guardian to her siblings.

Though proud of his English heritage, Richard wanted his children to get a "Canadian education," according to her sister Emily. The children were sent to public school rather than the typical private finishing schools. Richard arrived in Victoria from England after first arriving in California with his wife and two eldest sisters in 1863. There, he set up a provisions importing business on Wharf Street. The Carrs bought four and a half acres of land when they arrived and then hired Wright & Saunders, a local architectural firm to build their home. Richard sold some of the land before his death in 1888.

== Relationship with sister, Emily Carr ==
It's reported that Edith and Emily Carr disliked each other. The conflict grew after Edith became head of the family in 1888, which Emily described in her book Growing Pains. Emily accused her sister of beating her and her brother with a riding whip. She also claimed that part of the reason her father let her go to art school was to tame the hostility between the two sisters. However, there have been attempts to dispute Emily's claims about her sister, as Edith was publicly perceived as a valued member of her community and a charitable person who cared for her family's well-being.

Tension remained between the Carr girls whenever Emily visited home. On one occasion, Emily played a prank on her sister, setting up a meeting between Edith and a Presbyterian minister, and telling each of them that the other had requested the meeting. When Edith and the minister arrived, they were confused as to why the other was there. Emily eventually admitted she had set up the prank as an April Fool's trick.

After that, Emily and Edith's relationship improved for a while until 1899, when Emily got a dog. The dog turned out to be vicious and aggressive and Edith disliked it. When Emily went on a day trip that year, an accident delayed her return. Police came to investigate complaints about the dog, so Edith allowed them to put the dog down. Emily said she would never forgive her sister for this. However, when Emily got the news that Edith was on her deathbed, she returned to reconcile with her elder sister.

Around 1911, Emily borrowed a sum of money from Edith in order to finance the construction of her House of All Sorts. The house, designed by architect John R. Wright, was a two-story apartment building with a studio for Emily to work in. The home was originally called Hill House, but was later nicknamed the House of All Sorts because of the mix of people and animals residing in the house.

== Work ==
=== Art ===
Edith dabbled in several art forms, including China-painting, wood-carving, and jewelry making. She taught these skills to others in Victoria, and continued to teach well into her sixties in her family home. Carr won first prize for china-painting at the Victoria Fall Fair in 1904. She may have also won first prize in the 1893 Victoria Fair, but the record lists only a "Miss E. Carr," which could have been Edith's younger sister Emily. The first prize that year was awarded for the best pen and ink sketches, an art form practiced by both Emily and Edith. Edith hosted an exhibition each Christmas in the family home, where she would sell her art and craft work to members of the community. She also sold her work her work at the annual Reformed Episcopal Church Christmas Bazaar.

=== YWCA founding ===
All of the Carr sisters had a role in founding the YWCA in Victoria. Initially, there was no official headquarters, so members of the community would meet at the Carr household to talk and pray.

== Later life ==
In 1911, the Carr family decided to sell their land, but due to legal restrictions it wasn't sold until 1912. The remaining land was divided between the siblings. Edith rented out the family home and spent $5,000 having a cottage built on her share of the estate at 231 St. Andrews Street in 1913. The Carr's other sister, Elizabeth, lived with her there and used her own share of land for a garden plot. The sisters lived in the cottage until 1916, when Edith and Elizabeth moved back into the family home where Edith continued teaching art lessons.

== Death ==
Edith's other sister, Tallie, died in 1919. According to records, Edith mourned her sister excessively, as they were always very close. It is believed that stress from her grief worsened her underlying health conditions. Edith was diagnosed with terminal cancer months later.

Emily returned home to reconcile with Edith before she died on December 11, 1919, in Victoria.
