= Harold Mortimer-Lamb =

Anglo-Canadian mining engineer

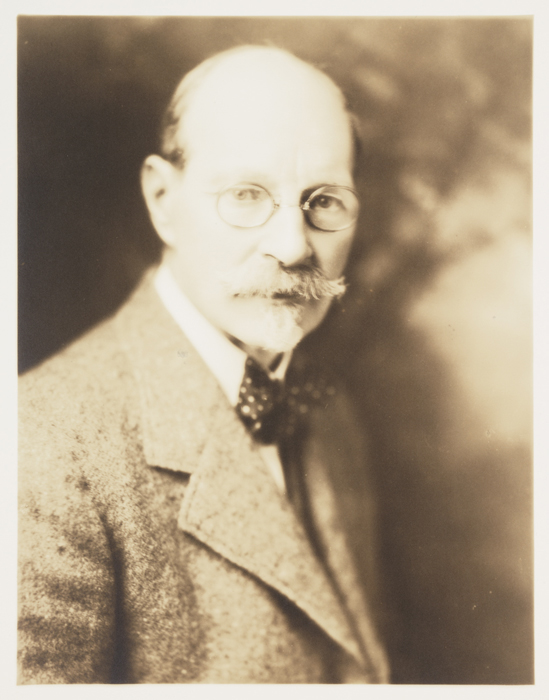
- Born: 21 May 1872; Leatherhead, England
- Died: 25 October 1970 (aged 98); Burnaby, British Columbia, Canada
- Occupation: Mining Engineer
- Children: Molly Lamb Bobak, Oliver Mortimer-Lamb

Harold Mortimer-Lamb (1872 - 1970) was an Anglo-Canadian mining engineer, journalist, photographer, and artist perhaps best known for championing the Group of Seven in the 1920s. He was the father of New Brunswick artist Molly Lamb Bobak.

== Early life ==
Harold Mortimer-Lamb was born in Leatherhead, Surrey, England on 21 May 1872. He immigrated to Canada in 1889, settling in British Columbia. He began his career as a farmhand, then became a layreader for an Anglican Church. He met and married Katherine Mary Lindsay in 1896, and had six children with her - one which was stillborn and one which died in infancy. Four sons lived to adulthood: Oliver, J. Haliburton (who became a soldier in the First World War), Willoughby, and Lawrence.

The family moved to Montreal and hired a housekeeper named Mary Williams (formerly Alice Price). Harold's wife Kate had begun to take ill and is described as "sickly" from now until the end of her life. At some point in their stay in Montreal, Harold experienced a mental-health crisis of some kind and resigned his position with the Canadian Mining Institute, wishing to return to BC; they instead instituted a transfer to the West Coast with a leave of absence.

In 1920, the family moved back to British Columbia, taking Mary Williams with them. At this time, Mary was pregnant with Harold's child; Molly Lamb was born in February 1920, just after the move. Mary Williams stayed with the Mortimer-Lamb family for 22 years. Kate died after 45 years of marriage to Harold. Mary and Harold never married. In 1942, Harold Mortimer-Lamb married Vera Weatherbie, a muse of Frederick Varley's and a school friend of Molly's. Harold was 70 and Vera 33 at the time; this marriage lasted 28 years, until Harold's death at the age of 99.

Most of his professional life was in the mining industry of Canada. He did, however, become interested in photography early on, specializing in soft focus romantic portraits.

== Mining engineering ==
He worked for the Bureau of Information for the B.C. Government. He became Secretary-Treasurer of the Provincial Mining Association of B.C.; Secretary of the Canadian Mining Institute and served on the staff of the Department of Mines in Ottawa. He was the founding editor of the British Columbia Mining Record.

Mortimer-Lamb was appointed Secretary of the Canadian Mining Institute in the early 1900s which required him to relocate to Montreal.

== Photography ==
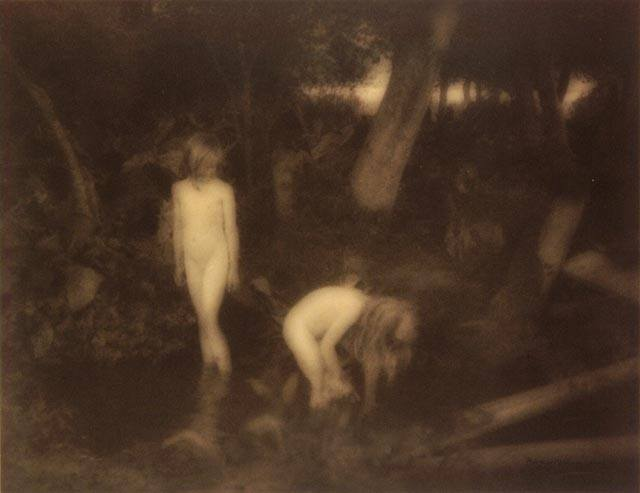
The Pool, Harold Mortimer-Lamb c. 1907, a gelatin silver print

While living in Montreal, he had the opportunity to meet, and become acquainted with, many of the leading artists of the day including Homer Watson, William Brymner, Maurice Cullen, Laura Muntz Lyall and later, members of the Group of Seven, in particular A.Y. Jackson. During this time, he also acted as the Montreal correspondent for the leading English art journal, The Studio. As an art critic he wrote in defence of the Group of Seven at a time when most other critics were attacking their work.

Around 1920, he left his position at the Mining Institute in Montreal to take up the post of Secretary-Treasurer of the BC Division in Vancouver. In 1926, he opened a gallery on Robson Street with fellow photographer John Vanderpant. Although their association was short-lived, the gallery continued and was a centre for music, poetry, and painting. Among the artists showcased were members of the Group of Seven. After his retirement from the mining industry in 1941, he himself began to paint, his works being exhibited in Montreal and Vancouver.

As a photographer, Mortimer-Lamb's work was widely exhibited and he was considered a prominent member of the Pictorialist movement. He organized the first major Canadian exhibition of Pictorialist photography in 1907 with Sidney Carter. Mortimer-Lamb was eventually elected an Honorary Fellow of the Royal Photographic Society and a member of The Linked Ring. For many years, he also fostered a keen interest in the arts, helping to found a small art club in Victoria and frequently contributing articles on the Canadian art scene to the Canadian Magazine and other periodicals. Additionally, he wrote art criticism as well as about his experiments with photographic technique for international photography journals and for the Pictorialist publications Photograms of the Year and the Studio.

In 1942, he married painter and model Vera (Olivia) Weatherbie. His daughter was Molly Lamb Bobak, a well-known Canadian artist, and Canada's first woman war artist.

Harold Mortimer-Lamb died in Burnaby, BC on 25 October 1970.

== Publications ==
- Photograms of the Year (1895 - 1940) with Sidney Carter
- British Columbia Mining Record (ed.)

== Notes and references ==
=== Further readng ===
- Amos, Robert (2013). Harold Mortimer-Lamb: The Art Lover. TouchWood Editions. ISBN 978-1-77151-018-9.
- Bassnett, Sarah; Parsons, Sarah (2023). Photography in Canada, 1839–1989: An Illustrated History. Toronto: Art Canada Institute. ISBN 978-1-4871-0309-5.
- Lerner, Loren R.; Williamson, Mary F. (1991). Art and Architecture in Canada: A Bibliography and Guide to the Literature. University of Toronto Press. ISBN 978-0-8020-5856-0.
- Macdonald, Colin S. (1971). "Lamb, Harold Mortimer". A Dictionary of Canadian Artists: Jacobi to Lismer. Canadian Paperbacks. ISBN 978-0-919554-05-4.
- Murray, Joan (2012). Laura Muntz Lyall: Impressions of Women and Childhood. Montreal, Quebec: Boardwalk Ventures Inc. by McGill Queen's University Press. ISBN 978-0-7735-4098-9.
- Obee, Dave (10 November 2013). "Books: Art lover helped shape Greater Victoria gallery's collection". Times Colonist.
- Scoones, Anny (2006). Home and Away: More Tales of a Heritage Farm. TouchWood Editions. ISBN 978-1-894898-49-2.
- Tippett, Maria. "Review of Harold Mortimer-Lamb: The Art Lover". BC Studies.
