= Eric Brown (museum director) =

Canadian artist (1877-1939)

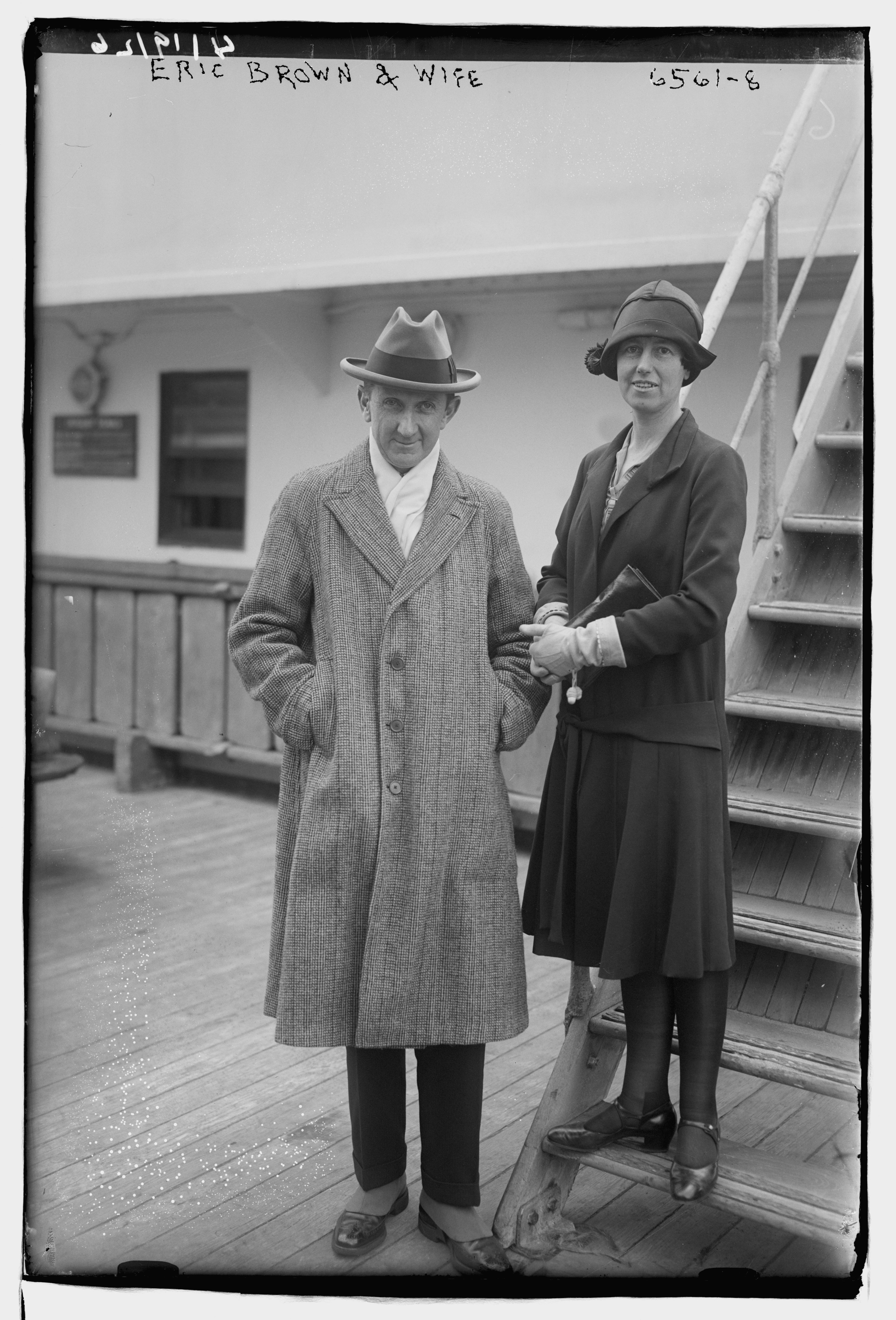
- Born: 1877; Nottingham, England
- Died: April 6, 1939 (aged 61–62)
- Known for: gallery director
- Spouse: Florence Maud Sturton (1881–1978) (m. 1910)

Eric Brown (1877–1939) was the first Director of the National Gallery of Canada. His tenure was from 1910–1939.

== Career and biography ==
Eric Brown was born in Nottingham, England. His brother was the British landscape painter Sir John Arnesby Brown (1866–1955).

In 1909, Brown immigrated to Canada at the invitation of F.R. Heaton (1866–1939), head of W. Scott and Sons, Montreal art dealers. Upon his arrival, Brown superintended a loan exhibition of British paintings in Montreal and worked for the Art Gallery of Toronto. While in Montreal and Toronto, Brown met Sir Edmund Walker (1848–1924), who hired him first to undertake work for the Toronto Art Association and then as both Secretary for the Advisory Arts Council and Curator of the National Gallery of Canada, Ottawa.

In 1910, Brown married Florence Maud Sturton (1881–1978) of Holbeach, Lincolnshire, a teacher and graduate of Cambridge University.

=== The National Gallery of Canada ===
In 1910, Brown was appointed as the first director of the National Gallery of Canada. Initially the gallery was a collection of the diploma works of academicians, supplemented by occasional gifts; thus Brown's primary concern was the establishment of the Gallery and the building of its collections as well as sending exhibitions and making extended loans to other museums across the country. To these ends, Brown traveled across Canada and frequently in Europe and the United Kingdom, developing contacts with art historians, dealers, and advisors. In 1938, he organized a retrospective exhibition, A century of Canadian art, at the Tate Gallery in London. His wife, historian, Maud Brown, was keenly interested in art and art education, and took an interest in establishing art education programs for children at the National Gallery.

=== The Group of Seven ===
Brown was an early supporter of the Group of Seven, and began buying their paintings for the Gallery’s collection several years before the Group was officially established. Brown also made sure they were well represented in Canadian art shows at the Wembley Exhibition in England.

=== Honours and awards ===
He was an honorary member of the Royal Scottish Society of Painters in Watercolours and received the King George V Silver Jubilee Medal (1935) and the King George VI Coronation Medal (1937).

== See also ==
- Burant, Jim. Ottawa Art & Artists: An Illustrated History. Toronto: Art Canada Institute, 2022. ISBN 978-1-4871-0289-0
- National Gallery of Canada Library and Archives, Eric and Maud Brown fonds Eric and Maud Brown fonds: Finding aid"
