= Martha Fleming =

Canadian artist (born 1958)

- Born: 1958 (age 67–68); Toronto, Ontario, Canada
- Education: School of Advanced Study, University of London; School of Art Architecture and Design, Leeds Metropolitan University
- Occupations: Museum professional and academic

Martha Fleming is a museum professional and academic, working primarily in the intersecting fields of history of science, museology and history of collections. She has held research, teaching and leadership positions in both museums and universities in the United Kingdom, where she has lived since 1996. She has also held posts in university museums and collections in Denmark and in Germany. She lived and worked in Montreal, Québec, from 1981 until 1996, when she moved to London, England.

Much of her research is practice-based, translating into exhibitions, strategic development instruments, and pedagogical programmes. This approach derives from her earlier career (1980-1995) as an artist and art critic, where she developed a lasting interest in interdisciplinary methodologies integrating research and practice. She also publishes her research in scholarly contexts such as History of Science and Smithsonian Institution Scholarly Press.

== Early life ==
Fleming was born in Toronto, Ontario, Canada, on 2 October 1958, the daughter of Canadian graphic designer Allan Fleming (1929-1977) and publishing executive Nancy Fleming (1931-2008). Her brother is the furniture designer Peter Robb Fleming. Her sister is the Chef and Culinary Arts Professor, Susannah Jane Fleming. The siblings’ godparents were the poet Richard Outram and the artist Barbara Howard. The family home was a hub for Canadian creative professionals in the 1960s and 1970s, and was well appointed with furnishings both traditional and modernist, antiques, art and an extensive book collection. Fleming's childhood took place in this expansive cultural context.

Fleming's father experienced stress-related health challenges while working as vice president and Executive Art Director for MacLaren Advertising (now McCann Worldgroup) from 1963 to 1968. Her parents separated in 1976, and her father died shortly thereafter in 1977.

Fleming worked for rare book sellers in Toronto on leaving school in 1974, including Monk Bretton Books and the Albert Britnell Book Shop. At the suggestion of her godfather, Fleming concurrently audited courses in English Literature at the University of Toronto, including lectures by Northrop Frye on the narrative structure of the Bible, lectures which were later published posthumously.

== Higher Education ==
Fleming was awarded a Commonwealth Scholarship in 1997 to pursue a MA (Master of Arts) in The History of the Book at the School of Advanced Study of University of London. Fleming later received her PhD, titled From Le Musee des Sciences to the Sciences Museum: Fifteen Years of Evolving Methodologies in the Art and Science Interface from the School of Art, Architecture and Design of Leeds Metropolitan University.

== Artistic career ==
In her early artistic career, Fleming was an involved in various artist-run centres, and authored art criticism and theoretical articles for publications such as ArtForum, Open Letter, and Block, among others.

=== Collaboration with Lyne Lapointe ===
In 1981, Fleming established both a romantic and collaborative relationship with French-Canadian artist Lyne Lapointe. The couple lived together in Montreal, Quebec, where from their studio base they produced internationally a substantial body of research-intensive site-specific installations that were mainly self-organised, forging a deep and intersectional feminist aesthetics. Their hybrid practice was informed by, and contributed to, emerging artforms at the time such as installation, site-specificity, conceptual art, institutional critique, representational critique, readymades (found-objects), and appropriation. The projects which occupied abandoned architectures constituted forms of urban activism, inscribing critical thinking in marginal spaces in cities, and refuting the privatization of public space. Each Fleming and Lapointe project addressed a specific nexus of epistemic and political concern, addressing complex social issues historically embedded or metaphorically present at such sites.

==== Large scale site-specific installation projects by Fleming & Lapointe ====
- Projet Building / Caserne #14 (1983) 4247 Saint-Dominique Street, Montréal: self-organised
- Le Musée des Sciences (1984) 1700 Notre Dame Street West, Montreal: self-organised
- La Donna Delinquenta (1987) 2480 Notre Dame Street West, Montreal: self-organised
- The Wilds and The Deep (1990) Battery Maritime Ferry Terminal, New York City: Creative Time and The Mayor's Office for Culture
- Duda (1992) Municipal Library, Emir Mohammed Park, Madrid: Edge Biennale
- These The Pearls (1992) St Paul's Dock Street Church, London: Edge Biennale
- The Spirit & The Letter & The Evil Eye (1994) Book Museum, Bayntun's Book Bindery, Bath: Bath Festivals Trust
- Matéria Prima (1994) Casa de Dona Yaya, São Paulo: São Paulo Biennale with Artemise Productions

La Donna Delinquenta refers to Cesare Lombroso's 1893 book, The Female Offender, an early and influential criminological treatise profiling prostitutes, immigrants and poor people in order for police to identify prospective criminals.

In December 1989, Fleming and Lapointe held their first collaborative exhibition in a museum setting, titled, Eat Me/Drink Me/Love Me, at The New Museum of Contemporary Art in New York. The title and exhibition is a response to poet Christina Rosetti’s 19th century allegorical poem "Goblin Market", which explores themes of feminine temptation, redemption, and conflicts between virtue and sensual pleasure, in a pastoral setting. Eat Me/Drink Me/Love Me, transformed the Museum's gallery in to a space of a domestic yet nature-rooted environment, with found objects, materials from the natural world, and other architectural elements. Together, these elements transfused the themes of emotional and sexual possibilities or restrictions for women, including a homoerotic twist, inspired by "Goblin Market."

At the end of their 15-year relationship in 1995, Fleming and Lapointe had a retrospective, titled Studiolo, incorporating the bulk of research, processes, and discursive and creative projects that they shared. The show was exhibited at the Museum d’Art Contemporain in 1997, and later at the Art Gallery of Windsor 1998 invited by curator at the time, Helga Pakasaar. Accompanied with the exhibition was an associated book, also titled Studiolo. The book showcases the philosophical, historical, and aesthetic frameworks associated to the exhibition, and is located in Artextes Editions of 1997.

== Academic and Museum Career ==
In 1996, Fleming moved to London, England. While her formative years collaborating with Lapointe still greatly influenced her later work, her relocation to the UK enabled her to develop her practice further in interdisciplinary research fields, as she participated extensively in research projects at several major UK museums and universities. Fleming has specialised in the design, creation and management of research projects and centres which conjoin humanities disciplines (often in university settings) with museum and collection institutions. Fleming has furthermore lectured, edited, and published in various contexts, including that of lectureships, scholarly journals, and art journals. Since the beginning of 2000s, Fleming has been the recipient of several grants, and has been involved in several major interdisciplinary research projects.

=== Teaching ===
Fleming has taught in universities and in museum-university partnerships, most notably as inaugural Programme Director of the Centre for Collections Based Research at the University of Reading (2013-2016). Her earlier teaching career includes positions at Concordia University (Montreal), where she taught critical theory and studio practice, and Vermont College of Fine Arts (Montpellier), as well as at Anglia Ruskin University (Cambridge) and Camberwell College of Art (London). She has supervised and trained doctoral and post-doctoral research students variously at the University of Copenhagen's Medical Museion (2006-2009); the Materials Library of King's College London (2007-2010); the Centre for Collections Based Research University of Reading; and at the Forschungskolleg "Wissen | Ausstellen" of the University of Göttingen.

=== Research Positions ===
- Fellow, UK National Endowment for Science, Technology and the Arts (2004-2007) "Fleming Fellowship National Endowment for Science Technology and the Arts". marthafleming.net. April 2004.
- Visiting associate professor, Medical Museion, Institute of Public Health, Faculty of Health Sciences, University of Copenhagen (2006-2009) "Medicinsk Museion: Corporeality - About Us".
- Visiting Scholar, Max Planck Institute for the History of Science, Berlin ("History of Scientific Observation", Department II) (2008) "MPIWG Research Report 2008-09" (PDF).
- Visiting Scholar, Max Planck Institute for the History of Science, Berlin ("Sciences of the Archive", Department II) (2012) The Epistemic Effect of Display Practices on the Development of Pre-Linnean Taxonomy "MPIWG Sciences of the Archive - Fleming Epistemic Effect".
- Affiliated Scholar, Department of History and Philosophy of Science, University of Cambridge (2012-2015)
- Senior Research Associate, Assembling Alternative Futures for Heritage, Institute of Archaeology, University College London (2015-2016) "UCL IOA - Heritage Futures". 22 January 2019.
- Visiting Scholar, Lichtenberg Kolleg, University of Göttingen (2018) "Martha Fleming - Lichtenberg Kolleg University of Göttingen".

Fleming has a particular interest in museology and museum practices, including the histories of collections and the ways in which these intersect with histories of knowledge production and global colonial histories.

=== Museum Positions ===
- Creative Director, ‘Split & Splice: Fragments from the Age of Biomedicine", Medicinsk Museion, University of Copenhagen (2008–2009)
- Centre for Arts and Humanities Research, Natural History Museum, London. Vice Chancellor's Investment Fund Secondment to the Natural History Museum (2009–2011) "Natural History Museum CAHR". 30 November 2009.
- Programme Director, Centre for Collections Based Research, University Museums and Special Collections, University of Reading (2013–2016) "Collections Based Research — University of Reading".
- Senior Research Associate, ‘Enlightenment Architectures: Sir Hans Sloane’s Catalogues of His Collections’, British Museum (2016–2019) "British Museum Research Projects — Enlightenment Architectures".
- Deputy Director, Victoria and Albert Museum Research Institute (2016–2017) "V&A — VARI People".

=== Museum Exhibitions post-1996 ===
Held at the Science Museum of London, England, Fleming's exhibition Atomism and Animism is an amalgamation of scientific objects of the Cartesian Enlightenment period, distributed in juxtaposing displays across the museum. In a similar light to the collaborative installation La Musee de Sciences with Lapointe in 1984, the displays created a reflective and critical response to museum practices which reestablished new and multiple orderings of scientific tropes and meanings.

Other museum exhibition and project collaborations include Split + Splice at the Medical Museion of the University of Copenhagen (2008-2009); and You are Here: The Design of Information, at the Design Museum in London.
