= Eleanor Bond =

Canadian artist and art educator

- Born: 25 March 1948 (age 78); Winnipeg, Manitoba, Canada
- Education: School of Art, University of Manitoba, graduated in 1976

Eleanor Bond (born 25 March 1948) is a Canadian multimedia artist and art educator who is best known for reworking the Canadian landscape tradition using a new ecological awareness.

== Early life ==
Eleanor Bond was born in Winnipeg to pharmacist Herbert Bond and teacher Mildred MacFarlane. She graduated from the School of Art, University of Manitoba in 1976. A previous undergraduate degree included studies in English, comparative religion and interior design.

== Work ==
In the early 1980s, Bond produced aerial views of natural sites showing ecological disruption. In her Work Station (1989) and Social Centres (1992) bodies of work, Bond explored the impact of technological advances and urban design on humankind by producing staged, fictitious landscapes and built urban environments. She used lengthy, ironic titles in her earlier work. These large-scale, unstretched canvases suggested that the city is an imaginary place with landscapes that existed as in-between spaces.

Recent projects include the Mountain of Shame series of paintings and sculptures (2010) that marked a shift away from the social and architectural and towards the personal. Bond created an emotional topography in which the vulnerabilities of doubt, age and loss are mapped on the surfaces of various media.

Bond's work has been widely exhibited in Canada and internationally, including solo shows at the Witte de With Center for Contemporary Art in Rotterdam (1988 and 1995), the Clocktower in New York (1990), the Winnipeg Art Gallery (1992), Museo de Arte Moderna de São Paulo in Brazil (1995), Musée d'art contemporain de Montréal (1998) and Museum of Contemporary Canadian Art in Toronto (2001). Group exhibitions have included shows at The National Gallery of Canada (1989) and the Vancouver Art Gallery (1991) as well as exhibitions at the Museum of Contemporary Art in São Paulo (1987) and the Barbican Centre in London (1991).

Bond has been a lecturer, has held studio residencies abroad, and has been actively involved in Plug In ICA in Winnipeg since its inception. Bond's solo show Mountain of Shame, curated by Helga Pakasaar, was the inaugural exhibition that opened the new Plug In ICA gallery in 2010 and toured to the Illingworth Kerr Gallery at the Alberta College of Art & Design (ACAD) in Calgary in 2011.

Bond is an associate professor of painting and drawing who works with graduate students at Concordia University. She also maintains an active art studio in the North End, Winnipeg.

== Honours and awards ==
- York Wilson Prize;
