= Barbara Howard (artist) =

Canadian artist

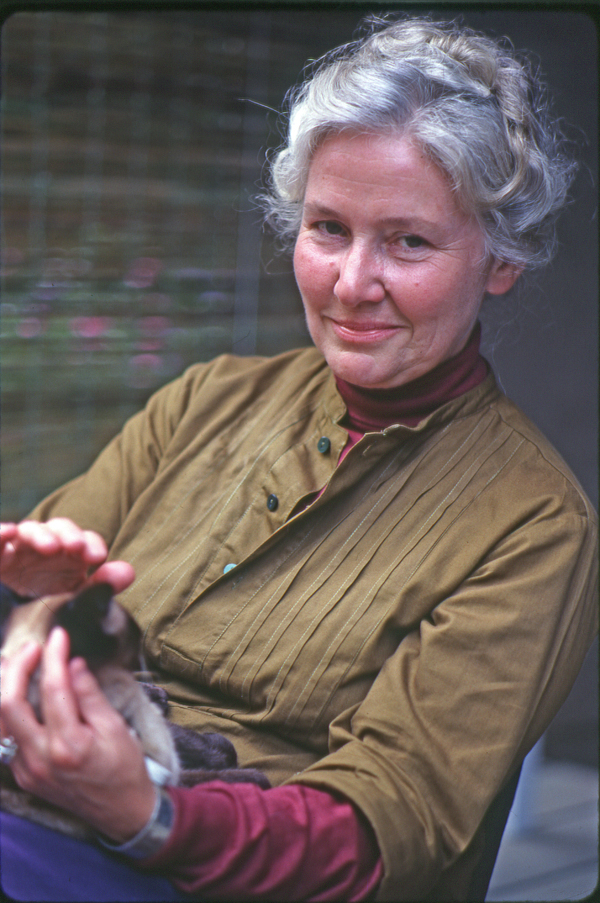
- Barbara Howard in 1980
- Born: Helen Barbara Howard; March 10, 1926; Long Branch, Ontario, Canada
- Died: December 7, 2002 (aged 76); Peterborough, Ontario, Canada
- Education: Ontario College of Art, Toronto, Ontario, Canada Saint Martin's School of Art, London, UK
- Known for: Painter, Graphic artist, Wood engraver, Book designer, Book binder
- Spouse: Richard Outram
- Elected: 1975, Royal Canadian Academy of Arts
- Website: www.barbarahoward.ca

Helen Barbara Howard RCA (March 10, 1926 – December 7, 2002) was a Canadian painter, wood-engraver, drafter, bookbinder and designer who produced work consistently throughout her life, from her graduation in 1951 from the Ontario College of Art until her unexpected death in 2002.

Her work is represented in many permanent collections, including the National Gallery of Canada, the Art Gallery of Ontario, the British Library, the Bodleian Library in Oxford, United Kingdom and The Library of Congress in Washington. Her work also hangs in private, public and corporate collections in Canada, the United Kingdom and the United States.

== Life ==
Howard was born in Long Branch, Ontario, in 1926, the younger of two children. Her father, Thomas Howard, a secondary school teacher, was an English immigrant. Her mother, Helen Mackintosh, who was born in Winnipeg, was of Scottish ancestry. Having decided early to become an artist, Howard studied at the Ontario College of Art in Toronto from 1948 to 1951, where she was a pupil of Will Ogilvie, who taught her figure drawing, and Jock Macdonald, who taught her painting and composition. In her final year she won the silver medal in drawing and painting.

Howard taught art classes in Toronto until 1953, when she moved to London in the UK, where she studied at Saint Martin's School of Art, immersing herself in the English landscape and the cultural life of postwar London. She also travelled to Europe to visit the art museums of Rome, Venice, Florence, Paris and Madrid, and saw the Paleolithic cave paintings at Lascaux in southwestern France, an experience which influenced many of her later illustrations. In London she met her future husband, the Canadian poet, Richard Outram. Returning to Canada in 1956, Howard and Outram made their home in Toronto for the next 46 years.

In the late 1950s and early 1960s, Howard showed regularly at the Picture Loan Society, a Toronto gallery established by Douglas Duncan in 1936 to present the work of contemporary Canadian artists such as Emily Carr, Fred Varley, David Milne, Lawren Harris, and A.Y. Jackson. Several Canadian public collections possess Howard drawings and paintings acquired through the Douglas Duncan estate, as Duncan was also a collector of her work.

In 2002, Howard and Outram moved to Port Hope, Ontario, but soon after their arrival Howard fell and broke her hip. While undergoing surgery on December 7 in Peterborough, Ontario, she suffered a pulmonary embolism and died on the operating table.

== Work ==
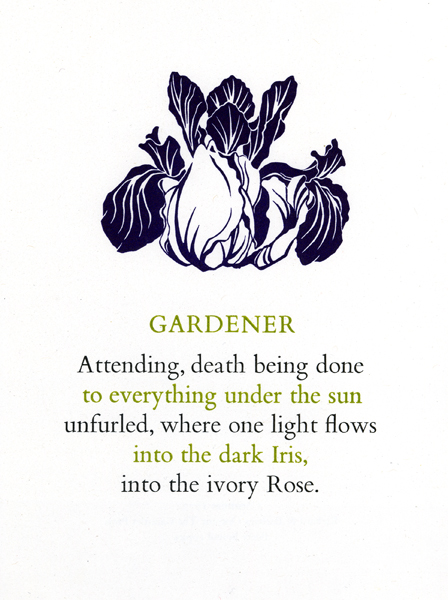
Wood engraving by Howard for the Gauntlet Press, 1977

Howard and her husband were part of a circle of artists, writers and designers who were interested in visual images, in language and in the book arts. One close associate was the graphic designer Allan Fleming, whose Martlet Press published Twenty-Eight Drawings by Barbara Howard in 1970, a period when she was drawing the figure. The Canadian wood engraver Rosemary Kilbourn, a close friend since art college, taught Howard to carve images that could be printed in conjunction with text.

In 1960, Howard and Outram launched the Gauntlet Press, a small private press which produced hand-bound letterpress volumes of Outram's poetry and Howard's wood engravings. These limited editions, prized by collectors, can also be found in such public collections as Library and Archives Canada, the Library of Congress, the British Library and the University of Toronto Thomas Fisher Rare Book Library. Throughout the 1970s and 1980s, the Gauntlet Press also issued a series of letterpress broadsheets of Outram's poems, all of them designed (and many illustrated) by Howard. Digital facsimiles of the books and broadsheets of the Gauntlet Press in the collection of the Memorial University of Newfoundland can be viewed at the website dedicated to The Gauntlet Press of Richard Outram and Barbara Howard, together with extensive background material and an exhaustive bibliography.

Imagery derived from the natural world was always at the heart of Howard's painting. Throughout her life she painted horizons, shorelines, skies, sun and water, although she was more concerned with the essence of a subject than with its precise representation.

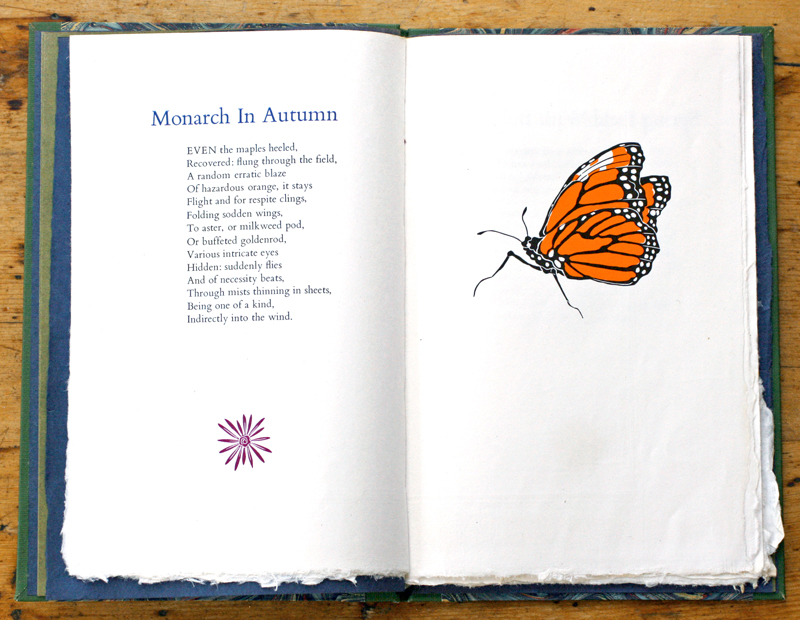
Engraving, book design and binding by Howard for the Gauntlet Press, 1974

In her sixties, she devoted a decade of work to an extensive series of cetacean studies, Encounters with Whales. In his essay Encounters and Recollections in the Art of Barbara Howard and Richard Outram, the poet Jeffery Donaldson writes: "For the most part, these are portraits of the mammals in something like their private element. Their appearances are brief, ecstatic revelations, fortuitous glimpses, sudden soundings. They seem to break forth abruptly from their solitude and then slip away as quickly again." These enormous canvases, some as large as 16 feet (4.9 m) across, have never been publicly exhibited.

In the late 1990s until her death in 2002, Howard returned to her lifelong fascination with light, night skies, the reflective surface of water. In these last paintings, there is a recurrence of circular elements, an abstraction of natural forms and a balancing of darkness and light. Howard has stated: "In my painting (as in all my work) I am deeply involved with light as the movement and inter-action of colours; the integrity of colour and form, hence with the integrity of the total work which has to do with spirit and abstract essence, not representation. I am preoccupied with life's ambiguities and dualities and in my later work I am reaching more and more from the dark toward light, freedom, and a transcending exuberance."

Howard's paintings, drawings, wood engravings and book designs can be viewed on the website Barbara Howard's Unfolding Visual World.

== Critical reception ==
With the exception of the very large whale canvases, Howard's paintings sold steadily throughout her lifetime. However, while she had her champions, she was never a part of the mainstream of Canadian art and so did not attract the kind of public critical attention that attends most successful careers. In her introduction to the catalogue for Howard's 1980 solo exhibition The Event in the Mind, sculptor Rebecca Sisler wrote:

Classification, school? Barbara Howard's work defies specific slotting, although we sense her recognition of the heritage left by great masters, Turner being the most obvious. But she draws and paints in direct response to her own muse and as such cannot be aligned to any particular art movement ... ... for in common with other maverick artists throughout art history, her work, although bound to no age, is relevant to all.

Writing about Howard's wood engravings in her 2006 essay Drawing Attention: Barbara Howard's Ecologies, the artist, curator and academic Martha Fleming states:

Wood engraving is a demanding process, and Howard was a virtuoso. [The creatures she portrayed] echo the floating, frameless engravings pioneered by Thomas Bewick in the 18th century, and yet they are startlingly modern. As much about form as they are about anatomical accuracy, they hover at the brink of typology but have nothing of zoological rendering's reduction to taxonomy. Her counterintuitive use of colour upholds the monochrome dignity inherent in the technique.

Howard was elected to the Royal Canadian Academy of Arts in 1975 and served on the RCA Council from 1980 to 1982.

== Selected public collections ==
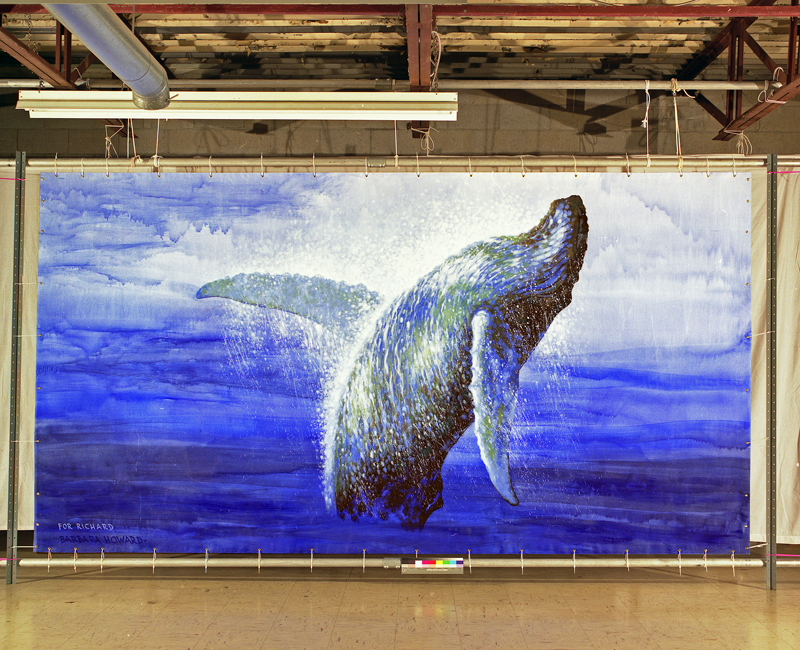
Humpback whale: breaching, 2.3 m × 4.1 m (7.5 ft × 13.5 ft) by Howard, 1991

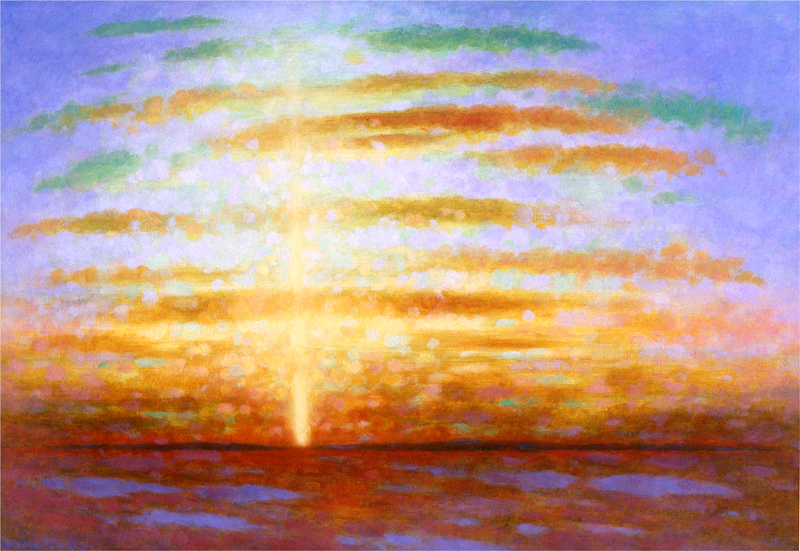
Sun Pillar, 64 cm × 91 cm (25 in × 36 in), by Howard, 1993

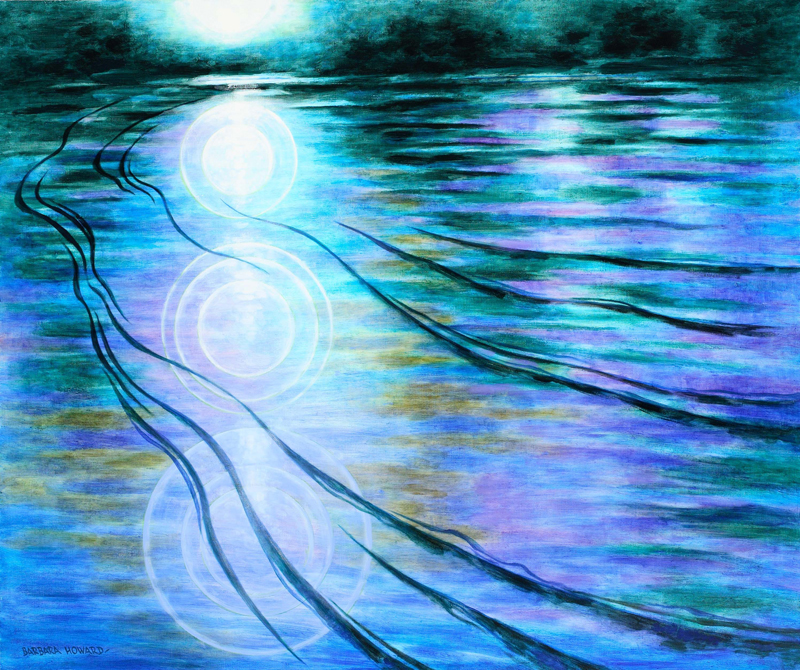
White Sun & Evening Shore, 1.0 m × 1.2 m (40 in × 48 in), by Howard, 2000

Public collections

- National Gallery of Canada
- Art Gallery of Ontario
- Art Gallery of Hamilton
- Art Gallery of Peel, Brampton
- Tom Thomson Art Gallery, Owen Sound
- Art Gallery of Windsor
- Art Gallery of Northumberland, Cobourg
- Museum London, London
- Art Gallery of Greater Victoria
- Glenhyrst Art Gallery of Brant
- Agnes Etherington Art Centre, Kingston
- Kitchener-Waterloo Art Gallery
- Rodman Hall, St. Catharines
- Province of Ontario Art Collection

Public collections of the Gauntlet Press

- Library and Archives Canada (formerly the National Library of Canada), Ottawa
- The Thomas Fisher Rare Book Library, University of Toronto
- The Gauntlet Press Collection of the Queen Elizabeth II Library, Memorial University of Newfoundland
- Bruce Peel Special Collections Library, University of Alberta
- The University of British Columbia Library
- University of Western Ontario, London, Ontario
- The MILLS Research Collections, McMaster University, Hamilton, Ontario
- The Trent University Archives, Peterborough, Ontario
- The University of Calgary, Alberta, Special Collections
- The Berg Collection, New York Public Library
- The Harris Collection of Poetry and Plays, Brown University, Providence, Rhode Island
- The Library of Congress, Washington, DC
- University at Buffalo, New York, Special Collections
- The Houghton Library, Harvard University, Cambridge, Massachusetts
- Bodleian Library, Oxford, UK
- The British Library, London

== Exhibitions ==
The first solo exhibition of Howard's paintings was at Toronto's Picture Loan Society in 1957. Pearl McCarthy, then art critic for The Globe and Mail, wrote that Howard was "far ahead of most landscapists in depth" and described her work as "first class ... the answer to a permanent sensuous desire". The last solo exhibition of Howard's paintings and drawings took place posthumously at the Art Gallery of Northumberland, Cobourg, Ontario, in 2006.

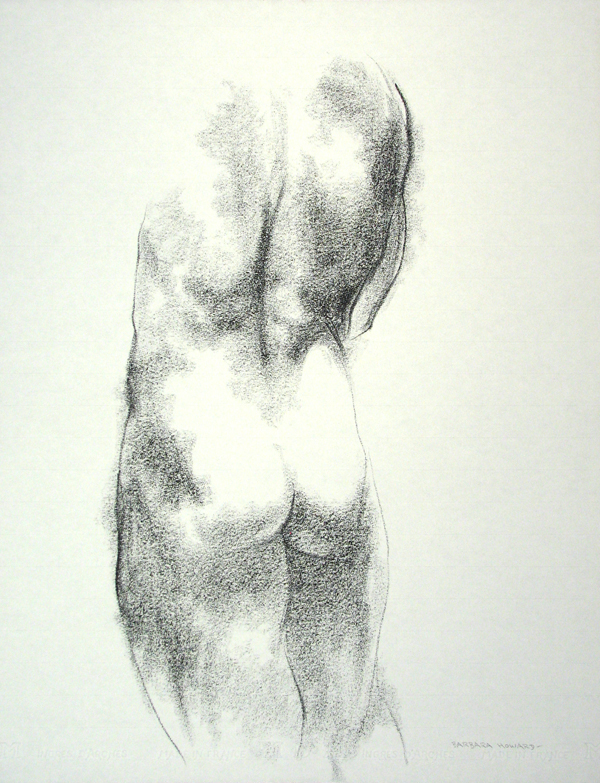
Standing male nude, 64 cm × 48 cm (25 in × 19 in), by Howard, c.1965

Solo exhibitions of Howard's work and/or the Gauntlet Press

- Picture Loan Society, Toronto 1957, 1958, 1960, 1965
- Wells Gallery, Ottawa, 1966, 1982, 1984
- Fleet Gallery, Winnipeg, 1966
- Victoria College, Toronto, 1966
- Sisler Gallery, Toronto, 1974, 1976
- Hart House, University of Toronto, 1975
- The Event in the Mind, Prince Arthur Galleries, Toronto, 1980; catalogue
- Yaneff Gallery, Toronto, 1983
- Massey College, Toronto, 1984
- Latcham Gallery, Stouffville, 1985
- O'Keefe Centre, Toronto, 1986
- National Library of Canada, 1986
- University College, Toronto, 1987
- Georgetown Library & Cultural Centre, 1988
- The Arts and Letters Club of Toronto, 1993
- E.J. Pratt Library, Victoria University, University of Toronto, 1995
- Robarts Library, University of Toronto, 1999
- The Upstairs Gallery, Art Gallery of Northumberland, Port Hope, 2003
- Seeking Light: Last Paintings and Selected Drawings. Art Gallery of Northumberland, Cobourg, 2006; catalogue

Group exhibitions

- Ontario Society of Artists, 1958, 1959
- Women's Committee, Art Gallery of Ontario, 1958, 1969
- Douglas Duncan Collection, Victoria College, Toronto, 1962
- Toronto Collects, Art Gallery of Ontario, 1961
- Women Artists, Canadian National Exhibition, Toronto, 1961
- Canadian Artists, Eaton's College Street, 1961
- Canadian Society of Graphic Arts, 1958, 1959, 1960, 1963
- National Home Show, 1960, 1961, 1962
- C.U.S.A.C. Travelling Show, Hart House, 1958–1959
- Women's Committee, London Art Gallery, 1962
- Canadian Watercolours, Drawings & Prints, National Gallery of Canada, 1966
- Douglas Duncan Collection, Windsor, London, Hamilton, 1967
- Drawings and Sculpture, Art Gallery of Ontario, 1976
- The Living Image, Macdonald Gallery, Toronto (3 artists); catalogue
- R.C.A. Centennial Contemporary Exhibition, Toronto, 1980
- Inaugural Exhibition, Academy House, R.C.A., Toronto, 1987–1988
- Art Under Fire, Academy House, R.C.A., Toronto, 1988
- Fine Printing: The Private Press in Canada. Travelling exhibition: Toronto, Fredericton, Calgary, Grimsby, Saskatoon, Brandon, Pointe Claire, Halifax, Saint John, 1995–1997; catalogue
- Women and Texts, University of Leeds, 1997 (curated by Special Collections, University of Calgary); catalogue
- Toronto in Print, Thomas Fisher Rare Book Library, 1998; catalogue
- Earthworks, an exhibition of works by Ontario Academicians, John B. Aird Gallery, Toronto, 1998
- Traces of Land, Traces of People: Contemporary Images of Ontario, Ontario Legislature, Queen's Park, Toronto, November 1999 – July 2000
