= Michelle Jacques (curator) =

Canadian curator (born 1965)

- Born: 1965 (age 60–61); Toronto, Ontario, Canada
- Education: Queen's University; York University
- Known for: Curator, educator

Michelle Jacques (born 1965) is a Canadian curator and educator known for her expertise in combining historical and contemporary art, and for her championship of regional artists. Originally from Ontario, born in Toronto to parents of Caribbean origin, who immigrated to Canada in the 1960s, she is now based in Saskatoon, Saskatchewan.

== Education ==
Jacques studied at Queen's University in Kingston, Ontario, where she obtained a B.A. in art history and psychology, and at York University, where she earned her M.A.

== Career ==
Jacques worked at the Art Gallery of Ontario for a number of years, holding positions including Assistant Curator of Contemporary Art and Acting Curator of Canadian Art. She was the Director of Programming at the Centre for Art Tapes in Halifax, Nova Scotia from 2002 to 2004. In 2012, she was named as the Chief Curator of the Art Gallery of Greater Victoria (AGGV). Jacques was named Head of Exhibitions & Collections/Chief Curator at Remai Modern in Saskatoon in 2020.

At the AGGV, she curated exhibitions of the work of contemporary artists including Carol Sawyer, Rodney Sayers and Emily Luce, Gwen MacGregor, and Hiraki Sawa, among others; and co-curated retrospective exhibitions of the work of the Canadian artists Anna Banana and Jock Macdonald. In the 2019 exhibition Unformable Things, she examined the work of Emily Carr alongside her Canadian contemporaries.

Jacques has taught writing and curatorial topics at institutions including NSCAD University, the University of Toronto Mississauga, and OCAD University.

She has also served on the board of numerous visual art organizations including Vtape, the Feminist Art Gallery and Mercer Union. In 2019, she was appointed as the inaugural vice-president, inclusion and outreach, of the Association of Art Museum Curators, a New York-based group that supports and promotes curatorial work around the world.

In 2021, she was one of the participants in John Greyson's experimental short documentary film International Dawn Chorus Day.

== Critical and curatorial writing ==
As an extension of her curatorial practice, Jacques has authored and co-authored numerous exhibition catalogues. She has also published essays, reviews, and interviews in magazines. This includes serving as a board member, writer, and a contributing editor at Fuse Magazine; and submissions to Chatelaine, Canadian Art, and Public Journal, among others.

== Juried art competitions ==
Jacques has sat as a juror on numerous art competitions. Recent examples include:

- The Scotiabank Photography Award, 2021
- The Salt Spring National Art Prize, 2021
- The Hnatyshyn Foundation Awards for Canadian Visual Artists and Curators, 2019
- Middlebrook Prize for Young Canadian Curators, 2019
- AIMIA | AGO Photography Prize, 2011

== Awards ==
- 2022 The Hnatyshyn Foundation Awards for Canadian Visual Artists and Curators
- In March 2024 Jacques was awarded the Governor General's Awards in Visual and Media Arts.

The Canada Council for the Arts stated at the time of presenting the Governor General's Award "Jacques's contributions to the field are formative and utterly unique. With unwavering commitment, intelligence, vision, wisdom, and above all poise and generosity of spirit, she is an inspiring role model, mentor, and creative thinker of the highest order. She thinks globally, contextually, and multi-disciplinarily, always embedded in the local and the current with the long view of entangled histories."
