= Institutional critique =

Artistic movement and commentary

In art, institutional critique is the systematic inquiry into the workings of art institutions, such as galleries and museums, and is most associated with the work of artists like Michael Asher, Marcel Broodthaers, Daniel Buren, Andrea Fraser, John Knight, Adrian Piper, Fred Wilson, and Hans Haacke and the scholarship of Alexander Alberro, Benjamin H. D. Buchloh, Birgit Pelzer, and Anne Rorimer.

Institutional critique takes the form of temporary or nontransferable approaches to painting and sculpture, architectural alterations and interventions, and performative gestures and language intended to disrupt the otherwise transparent operations of galleries and museums and the professionals who administer them. Examples would be Niele Toroni making imprints of a No. 50 brush at 30 cm (12 in) intervals directly onto gallery walls as opposed to applying the same mark to paper or canvas; Chris Burden's Exposing the Foundation of the Museum (1986), in which he made an excavation in a gallery of the Museum of Contemporary Art, Los Angeles, to expose the literal concrete foundation of the building;, Andrea Fraser inhabiting the persona of an archetypical museum docent in the form of a live performance or video document, or art group monochrom who sent the fictitious artist Georg Paul Thomann to the São Paulo Art Biennial. Assumptions about the aesthetic autonomy of painting and sculpture, the neutral context of the white cube gallery, and the objective delivery of information are explored as subjects of art, mapped out as discursive formations, and (re)framed within the context of the museum itself. As such, institutional critique seeks to make visible the social, political, economic, and historical underpinnings of art. Institutional critique questions the false distinction between taste and disinterested aesthetic judgement, revealing that taste is an institutionally cultivated sensibility that differs depending on the intersection of any one person's class, ethnic, sexual, or gender subject positions.

== Origin ==
Institutional critique is a practice that emerged from the developments of Minimalism and its concerns with the phenomenology of the viewer; formalist art criticism and art history (e.g. Clement Greenberg and Michael Fried); conceptual art and its concerns with language, processes, and administrative society; and the critique of authorship that begins with Roland Barthes and Michel Foucault in the late 1960s and continues with the advent of appropriation art in the 1970s and its upending of long-held notions of authorship, originality, artistic production, popular culture, and identity. Institutional critique is often site-specific and is contemporaneous with the advent of artists who eschewed gallery and museum contexts altogether to build monumental earthworks in the landscape, notably Michael Heizer, Nancy Holt, Walter de Maria, and Robert Smithson. Institutional critique is also associated with the development of post-structuralist philosophy, critical theory, literary theory, feminism, gender studies, and critical race theory.

== Artists ==
Artists associated with institutional critique since the 1960s include Marcel Broodthaers, Daniel Buren, Hans Haacke, Michael Asher, John Knight (artist), Christopher D'Arcangelo, Robert Smithson, Dan Graham, Mierle Laderman Ukeles, Adrian Piper, and Martha Rosler. Artists active since the 1980s include Louise Lawler, Antoni Muntadas, Fred Wilson, Santiago Sierra, Martha Fleming and Lyne Lapointe, Renée Green, Group Material, Andrea Fraser, Renzo Martens, Fred Forest, Christian Philipp Müller, and Mark Dion.

In the early 1990s, influenced in large part by Daniel Buren, Jacques Tati, Roland Barthes, and the participatory sculptures of Felix Gonzalez-Torres, a loose affiliation of artists including Liam Gillick, Dominique Gonzalez-Foerster, Pierre Huyghe, and Rirkrit Tiravanija engaged the institution of art in a convivial manner. These artists, gathered under the rubric of Relational Aesthetics by critic Nicolas Bourriaud, saw galleries and museums as sites of social interaction and the spontaneous creation of works of art characterized by their contingent temporality. The collegial atmosphere of these open-ended situations was quite distinct from the more confrontational strategies of Buren, Haacke, Jenny Holzer, and Barbara Kruger.

In recent years, Maurizio Cattelan, Ellen Harvey, Matthieu Laurette, monochrom, Tameka Norris, Tino Sehgal, Carey Young, Cecilia Lisa Eliceche and others have taken a critical eye to the art museum and its role as a public and private institution.

== Criticisms ==
One of the criticisms of institutional critique is that it requires from its audience a familiarity with its esoteric concerns. As with much contemporary music and dance, the institutional critique of art is a practice that only specialists in the field—artists, theorists, historians, and critics—are privy to. Due to its sophisticated understanding of modern art and society—and as part of a privileged discourse—art as institutional critique can often leave lay viewers alienated and/or marginalized.

Another criticism of the concept is that it can be a misnomer. Artist Andrea Fraser (in Artforum) and critic Michael Kimmelman (in The New York Times) have argued, for example, that institutional critique artists work within—and benefit from—the very same institutions they ostensibly critique.
