= Richard Outram =

Canadian poet

- The poet Richard Outram in 1980
- Born: April 9, 1930; Oshawa, Ontario, Canada
- Died: January 21, 2005 (aged 74); Port Hope, Ontario, Canada
- Education: Victoria College, Toronto (HBA)
- Spouse: Barbara Howard

Richard Daley Outram (April 9, 1930 – January 21, 2005) was a Canadian poet. Often regarded as a poet's poet, he wrote eleven commercially published books of poetry in addition to the many collections of his poetry and prose published under the imprint of the Gauntlet Press. In 1999 he won the City of Toronto Book Award for his sequence of poems Benedict Abroad.

== Life ==
Outram was born in Oshawa, Ontario. His mother, née Mary Muriel Daley, was the daughter of a Methodist minister centrally involved in the negotiations which led to the creation of the United Church of Canada. While working as a schoolteacher, Outram's mother met and married his father, Alfred Allan Outram, in Port Hope, Ontario. Allan Outram, son of the owner of the hardware store in Port Hope, served and was wounded in the First World War. By profession, he was an engineer. The couple moved to Toronto. From 1944 to 1949, Outram attended high school in Leaside, which was then still on the outskirts of the city.

From 1949 to 1953, Outram was enrolled in the Honours B.A., English and Philosophy course at Victoria College in the University of Toronto. Two of his teachers, the philosopher Emil Fackenheim and the critic Northrop Frye, with the latter of whom Outram studied Milton, Spenser and (when E. J. Pratt became ill) Shakespeare, had a profound and lasting effect on him. During the summers of 1950 and 1951, Outram also served as an officer cadet in the reserve system of the Royal Canadian Navy, aboard frigates in the Bay of Fundy and at HMCS Stadacona in Halifax, Nova Scotia.

After graduation, Outram worked with the Canadian Broadcasting Corporation (CBC) as a television stagehand for a year, then he moved to London, England, where he worked as a television stagehand for the British Broadcasting Corporation between 1955 and 1956. During those years he began to write poetry. During them also, he met his future wife, the Toronto painter and wood engraver Barbara Howard. They returned to Toronto to marry in 1957. Outram went back to work with the CBC, first, again, as a television stagehand, then as a stage crew foreman, a position he held until early retirement at the age of sixty in 1990. Having lost his wife in 2002, Outram took his own life, dying of hypothermia in Port Hope, Ontario. On April 1, 2005, a celebration of the lives of Outram and Howard was held at The Arts and Letters Club of Toronto. Speakers included film director Ted Kotcheff, literary critic Alberto Manguel and poet Peter Sanger.

== Work ==
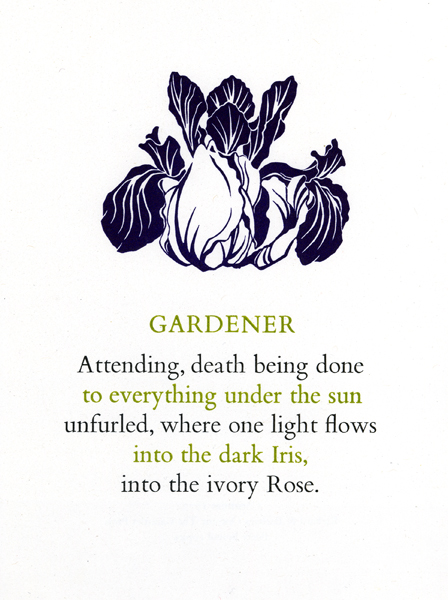
Gauntlet Press broadsheet, 1977

Between 1966 and 2001, Outram wrote ten commercially published collections of poetry (South of North: Images of Canada, with drawings by Thoreau MacDonald was published posthumously in 2007). In addition to these commercial publications, Outram issued over a dozen other collections of poetry and prose under the imprint of the Gauntlet Press, a small private press which he founded with his wife in 1960. Its limited editions (60-80 copies) of four small collections by Outram, Creatures (1972), Thresholds (1973), Locus (1974) and Arbor (1976), illustrated with wood engravings by Howard, are prized by collectors and can be found in public collections such as the University of Toronto Thomas Fisher Rare Book Library, which is also the repository for Outram's personal papers and manuscripts.

The Gauntlet Press also issued a series of broadsheets of Outram's poems throughout the 1970s and 1980s, all of them designed (and many illustrated) by Howard. In the early 1990s the Gauntlet Press switched from letterpress to digitally based production on the computer. As well as his poem and prose broadsheets, the press during this electronic phase issued nine small books by Outram in limited editions. Among them are Around & About the Toronto Islands (1993); Tradecraft and Other Uncollected Poems (1994); Eros Descending (1995); Ms Cassie (2000) and Lightfall (2001). Many of the poems from these Gauntlet Press publications (with the exception of Ms Cassie and Lightfall) have been gathered into the commercially available Dove Legend and Other Poems. Examples of the Ms Cassie broadsheets can be seen on the Porcupine's Quill web site.

Digital facsimiles of the books and broadsheets of the Gauntlet Press in the collection of the Memorial University of Newfoundland can be viewed at the website dedicated to The Gauntlet Press of Richard Outram and Barbara Howard, together with extensive background material and an exhaustive bibliography.

== The poetry ==
In a 1988 essay titled "Hard Truths", the literary critic Alberto Manguel wrote: “Richard Outram’s metaphysical message is neither fashionable nor easy to grasp, but he is one of the best poets writing in English.” Outram's work transcends fashion, expressing a private voice of public consequence in poems of great formal variety and range of tone. He is a most mercurial writer, delighting in satire and farce, in low and high comedy, in metaphysical poems of intricate philosophical complexity and dignity, in straightforward or not so straightforward lyrical love poems, and in dramatic soliloquies voiced for outrageously imagined characters, including some animals. Outram may write straightforward narrative poems in which, as is not usually the case in contemporary narrative poems, things really do happen consecutively. He can also write subtle parables and allegories, or commit squibs and puns or propose riddles and anagrams. His poetry must be read while attending to the full meaning of every word. It has been said that the best companion a reader can have when trying to fully appreciate an Outram poem is an etymological dictionary. It has also been argued that there is, at the same time, an ‘other’, more intuitively accessible side to his poetry.

Many years before his death, Outram wrote what he often referred to as his own epitaph:

Epitaph for an Angler

To haunt the silver river and to wait
Were second nature to him, his own bait:
Unravelling at last a constant knot,
He cast his line clear: and was promptly caught.

== Bibliography ==
=== Poetry ===
- Eight Poems. Toronto: Tortoise Press, 1959.
- Exsultate, Jubilate. Toronto: Macmillan Canada, 1966.
- Scarlatti at Improvisation (pamphlet). Toronto: Aliquando Press, 1972.
- Creatures. Toronto: Gauntlet Press, 1972.
- Railway (broadside). Toronto: Aliquando Press, 1973.
- Seer. With drawings by Barbara Howard. Toronto: Aliquando Press, 1973.
- Thresholds. Toronto: Gauntlet Press, 1973.
- Below Zero (broadside). Toronto: Aliquando Press, 1974.
- Locus. Toronto: Gauntlet Press, 1974.
- Turns and Other Poems. London, Toronto: Chatto and Windus with the Hogarth Press, 1975, and Anson-Cartwright Editions, 1976. ISBN 0-919974-00-7
- Arbor. Toronto: Gauntlet Press, 1976.
- The Promise of Light. Toronto: Anson-Cartwright Editions, 1979. ISBN 0-919974-05-8
- Selected Poems (1960-1980). Toronto: Exile Editions, 1984. ISBN 0-920428-85-1
- Man in Love. Erin, Ont.: Porcupine's Quill, 1985. ISBN 0-88984-069-5
- Hiram and Jenny. Erin, Ont.: Porcupine's Quill, 1989. ISBN 0-88984-118-7
- Mogul Recollected. Erin, Ont.: Porcupine's Quill, 1993. ISBN 0-88984-174-8
- Around & About the Toronto Islands. Toronto: Gauntlet Press, 1993.
- Hiram and Jenny, Unpublished Poems. Ottawa: Food for Thought Books, 1994.
- Tradecraft and Other Uncollected Poems. Toronto: Gauntlet Press, 1994.
- Eros Descending. Toronto: Gauntlet Press, 1995.
- Benedict Abroad. St. Thomas Poetry Series, Toronto, 1998. ISBN 9780969780298 (Winner of the 1999 City of Toronto Book Award)
- Ms Cassie. Toronto: Gauntlet Press, 2000.
- Dove Legend & Other Poems. Erin, Ont.: Porcupine's Quill, 2001. ISBN 0-88984-221-3
- Lightfall. Toronto: Gauntlet Press, 2001.
- Nine Shiners. Port Hope: n.p., 2003. With reproductions of paintings by Barbara Howard.
- Brief Immortals. Port Hope: n.p., 2003. With reproductions of paintings by Barbara Howard.
- South of North: Images of Canada, with drawings by Thoreau MacDonald. Erin, Ont.: Porcupine's Quill, 2007. ISBN 978-0-88984-298-4
- The Essential Richard Outram, Amanda Jernigan, ed., Erin, Ont.: Porcupine's Quill, 2011. ISBN 978-0-88984-338-7

=== Prose ===
- An Exercise in Exegesis. Toronto: Arts & Letters Club, 1991.
- Corrections to the Cave. Toronto: Arts & Letters Club, 1992.
- Peripatetics: Some Annotations, Glosses and Divers Comments Upon "Around & About the Toronto Islands". Toronto: Gauntlet Press, 1994
- "And Growes to Something of Great Constancie ...", being a SYZYGY. Toronto: Gauntlet Press, 1994.
- Divers Arrows. Toronto: Arts & Letters Club, 1995.
- Swann: A Literary Mystery (a brief talk on Carol Shields' book of that title, and on the poems included therein. Toronto: Arts & Letters Club, 1995.)
- Notes on William Blake's 'The Tyger'. Toronto: Arts & Letters Club, 1997.
- Stardust. Toronto: Arts & Letters Club, 1998.
- Of Blockheads. Toronto: Arts & Letters Club, 1999 & 2000.
- Arrows of Desire. Toronto: Hart House, 2000.
- Arrows of Desire. Toronto: Arts & Letters Club, 2001, (a revised version of the above).
- Rage & Outrage: Poetry & the Media. Toronto: Arts & Letters Club, 2002.
- Poetic Practice. Toronto: Arts & Letters Club, 2003.

=== Anthologies ===
- Christian Poetry in Canada, David A. Kent, ed., ECW Press, 1989. ISBN 1-55022-015-2
- Literature in English, W. H. New and W. E. Messenger, eds., Prentice Hall, Scarborough, ON, 1993. ISBN 0-13-534777-7
- In Fine Form: The Canadian Book of Form Poetry, Kate Braid & Sandy Shreve, eds., Polestar/Raincoast Books, Vancouver, BC, 2005. ISBN 1-55192-777-2
- Jailbreaks: 99 Canadian Sonnets, Zachariah Wells, ed., Biblioasis, Emeryville, ON, 2008. ISBN 978-1-897231-44-9
- Open Wide a Wilderness: Canadian Nature Poems, Nancy Holmes, ed., Wilfrid Laurier University Press, Waterloo, ON, 2009. ISBN 1-55458-033-1
- Arc Poetry Annual 2010: Best of How Poems Work (2003-2008), Arc Poetry Society, Ottawa, ON, 2009. ISSN 0705-6397
- Modern Canadian Poets, Evan Jones & Todd Swift, eds., Carcanet Press, Manchester, England, 2010. ISBN 978-1-85754-938-6
- Another English: Anglophone Poems from Around the World, Catherine Barnett & Tiphanie Yanique, eds., Poetry Foundation and Tupelo Press, North Adams, MA, 2014. ISBN 978-1-936797-40-0
- Earth and Heaven: An Anthology of Myth Poetry, Amanda Jernigan & Evan Jones, eds., Fitzhenry & Whiteside, Markham, ON, 2015. ISBN 978-1-55455-376-1
- In Fine Form 2nd Edition: A Contemporary Look at Canadian Form Poetry, Kate Braid & Sandy Shreve, eds., Caitlin Press Inc., Halfmoon Bay, BC, 2016. ISBN 978-1-987915-02-0
- 150+: Canada's History in Poems, Judy Gaudet, ed., The Acorn Press, Charlottetown, PEI, 2018. ISBN 978-1-927502-90-7

== Works about Outram or the Gauntlet Press ==
=== Books ===
- Horne, Alan and Guy Upjohn, eds. Fine Printing: The Private Press in Canada. Toronto: Canadian Bookbinders and Book Artists Guild, 1995. Catalogue of an exhibition held at the Thomas Fisher Rare Book Library, 18 April - 16 June 1995. ISBN 0-7727-6015-2
- Sanger, Peter. ‘Her Kindled Shadow ..’: An Introduction to the Work of Richard Outram. Antigonish, N.S.: Antigonish Review, 2001; rev. ed., 2002. ISBN 0-920653-05-7
- Sanger, Peter. Through Darkling Air: The Poetry of Richard Outram. Gaspereau Press, Kentville, N.S., 2010. An extensive study of the life and work of Canadian poet Richard Outram with detailed analysis of his poetry, his influences and allusions, and his collaboration with his wife, Barbara Howard, on the limited edition broadsides and handmade books issued from the Gauntlet Press. Includes over 75 photographic reproductions. ISBN 978-1-55447-061-7
- Ruthig, Ingrid, ed. Richard Outram: Essays on His Works. Guernica Editions, Toronto, ON, 2011. New essays, interview, lecture, and elegy, by poets and writers who admire Outram’s commitment to “concision and precision” in language: Brian Bartlett, Michael Carbert, Robert Denham, Jeffery Donaldson, Steven Heighton, Amanda Jernigan, Eric Ormsby, Ingrid Ruthig, Peter Sanger, and Zachariah Wells. ISBN 978-1-55071-280-3
- Donaldson, Jeffery. Echo Soundings: Essays on Poetry and Poetics. Palimpsest Press, Windsor, ON, 2014. ISBN 978-1-926794-21-1. Two essays: Encounters and Recollections in the Art of Barbara Howard and Richard Outram; and A Canadian Blake and his Frye: Richard Outram and Peter Sanger.

=== Special issues and magazine features ===
- The Antigonish Review 125 (2001). A feature on Richard Outram’s work, comprising Peter Sanger’s ‘Richard Outram: A Preface’ and twenty poems by Outram. This feature was later revised and republished as Richard Outram: A Preface and Selection, with a (corrected) cover image by Barbara Howard (The Antigonish Review Occasional Paper Number 3; Antigonish, Nova Scotia, 2001).
- Canadian Notes & Queries 63 (2003). A special issue on the work of Richard Outram. Guest ed. Michael Carbert. Comprising: William Blissett, ‘Collecting Gauntlets’; Terry Griggs, ‘Wordman’; Amanda Jernigan, ‘Hiram on the Night Shore’; Guy Davenport, ‘Entropy’; W. J. Keith, ‘Outram’s “Stage Crew”’; David Solway, ‘Reading Richard Outram’; Caroline Adderson, ‘Mogul Recollected’; Michael Darling, ‘A Chance Encounter with Richard Outram’; Eric Ormsby, ‘Banjo Music’; Jeffery Donaldson, ‘Encounters and Recollections in the Art of Barbara Howard and Richard Outram’; Carmine Starnino, ‘The Other Outram’; Peter Sanger, ‘A Word Still Dwelling’.
- DA: A Journal of the Printing Arts 44 (1999). A special issue on the Gauntlet Press, guest ed. Alan Horne, comprising: Alan Horne, ‘Editorial’; Richard Outram, ‘A Brief History of Time at The Gauntlet Press (Or, Some Days the Earth Moved)’; Barbara Howard, ‘A Painter Pressed into the Service of Poetry’; Donald W. McLeod, ‘A Checklist of The Gauntlet Press, 1960-1995’.
- The New Quarterly 21.4 (2001/2002). A feature on Richard Outram’s work, comprising Peter Sanger’s introduction, ‘The Sounding Light: Richard Outram and Barbara Howard’, and four poems by Richard Outram.
- The New Quarterly 89 (2004): 25-73. Three Encounters with Poet Richard Outram, comprising: Amanda Jernigan, ‘Graceful Errors and Happy Intellections: Encounters with Richard Outram’; Michael Carbert, ‘Faith and Resilience: An Interview with Richard Outram’; Richard Outram, ‘Rage and Outrage: Poetry and the Media’.

=== Articles, interviews, reviews ===
(in alphabetical order)

- Adamek, Anna. [Review of Benedict Abroad.] Arc 43 (1999): 95-96.
- Anderson, Rod. [Review of Man in Love.] Canadian Literature (1986): 148-50.
- Camlot, Jason. [Review of Benedict Abroad.] Journal of Canadian Poetry 15 (1998): 134-39.
- Cardy, Michael. [Review of Hiram and Jenny.] Canadian Author & Bookman 64.4 (1989): 16.
- Connolly, Kevin. ‘Penchant for odd syntax and ear for dialects ...’(review of Hiram and Jenny). Toronto Star (Toronto Star Magazine) 27 Apr. 1988: M6.
- Dabbene, Peter. [Review of The Essential Richard Outram.] Foreword Reviews, Traverse City, Michigan. 22 Dec. 2011.
- Dalgleish, Melissa. [Review of The Essential Richard Outram.] The Bull Calf, 4.1 (2014)
- de Santana, Hubert. 'Monarch in Mufti: Some Notes on Richard Outram, a Canadian Poet Whose Fame is Assured—at least Posthumously', Books in Canada, September (1976).
- Donaldson, Jeffery. ‘A Light Blaze in Rare Air: Richard Outram’. Books in Canada 32.7 (2003): 36.
- Einarsson, Robert. 'Richard Outram and the Poet’s Voice: Elocution and Reading Aloud', presented in the Department of English Speakers Series at Grant MacEwan University, on October 21, 2009

- Enright, Michael. 'Richard Outram: A Passion for Poetry'. (52 min. interview with Outram). The Sunday Edition. CBC Radio One. 7 April 2002. Replayed in part 30 January 2005, as part of a memorial feature. Listen online:
- Fitzgerald, Heather. [Review of Dove Legend.] Quill & Quire 67.3 (2001): 56.
- Hatch, Ronald B. ‘Poetry.’ University of Toronto Quarterly 56.1 (1986): 29-45. ‘Letters in Canada 1985’ poetry survey; includes a review of Man in Love.
- Howley, Martin J.S. 'The Gauntlet Press's Original Emblem'. DA: A Journal of the Printing Arts 65 (2010): 87-91.
- Hunter, Catherine. [Review of Mogul Recollected.] Prairie Fire 16.2 (1995): 149.
- Ingham, David. [Review of Hiram and Jenny.] Canadian Literature 129 (1991): 187-88.
- Jernigan, Amanda. ‘Holding to Desire: Verse Translations by Richard Outram’. Canadian Notes & Queries 73 (2008): 25-28. With fourteen previously unpublished verse translations.
- Kerr, Don. [Review of Hiram and Jenny.] Journal of Canadian Poetry. 5 (1990): 95-98.
- Kröller, Eva-Marie. [Review of Dove Legend and Other Poems]. Journal of Canadian Poetry 18 (2001) 118-20.
- MacKendrick, Louis K. ‘Richard Outram, Man in Love’. Journal of Canadian Poetry 2 (1985): 79-82.
- Manguel, Alberto. ‘Hard Truths’. Saturday Night 103.4 (1988): 57-59.
  - ‘Outram, Richard (1930 - )’ (encyclopedia entry). Routledge Encyclopedia of Post-Colonial Literatures in English. Ed. Eugene Benson and L. W. Connolly. London: Routledge, 1994.
  - ‘Waiting for an Echo: On Reading Richard Outram’ (rev. and updated version of ‘Hard Truths’). Into the Looking-Glass Wood. Toronto: Knopf, 1998. 225-35. ISBN 0-676-97135-0
- McKinney, Louise. ‘Architects of the Poetic Landscape’. Quill and Quire 55.2 (1989): 25. Includes a review of Hiram and Jenny.
- Mooney, Jacob McArthur. [Review of Richard Outram: Essays on his Work.] Northern Poetry Review (online), 2011
- Moore, Robert. ‘Poems for the Soul Reborn into an Age of “Stringent Myths”’ (review of Dove Legend). Books in Canada 31.6 (2002): 36-37.
- Murray, George. 'Collecting Outram' (article on Benedict Abroad), Maisonneuve, 2 Dec. 2004.
- Rae, Ian. ‘Loving and Leaving’ Canadian Literature 180 (2004): 167-69. Includes a review of Dove Legend.
- Reibetanz, Julie. ‘Poetry.’ University of Toronto Quarterly 72.1 (2002/03): 207-55. ‘Letters in Canada 2001’ poetry survey; includes a review of Dove Legend.
- [Review of Mogul Recollected.] Matrix 43 (1994): 78-80.
- Roberts, Paul. [Review of Selected Poems 1960-1980], Books in Canada, June/July 1985, p. 26-27
- Robertson, P. J. M. ‘Tragedy-inspired poems show visionary power’ (review of Mogul Recollected). Ottawa Citizen, 12 Feb. 1994: B8.
- Ruthig, Ingrid. [Review of South of North: Images of Canada], Northern Poetry Review (online), 23 Dec. 2008.
- Shedden, Lee. ‘Collections worth the read’ (includes review of Dove Legend). Calgary Herald 5 Feb. 2005: G5.
- Solway, David. ‘Reading Richard Outram.’ Director’s Cut. Erin, Ont.: Porcupine’s Quill, 2003. A version of his essay from Canadian Notes & Queries 63. ISBN 0-88984-272-8
- Starnino, Carmine. ‘The Other Outram’. A Lover’s Quarrel. Erin, Ont.: Porcupine’s Quill, 2004. A version of his essay from Canadian Notes & Queries 63. ISBN 0-88984-241-8
- Szumigalski, Anne. [Review of Mogul Recollected.] Arc 33 (1994): 77-78.
- Vulpé, Nicola. [Review of Selected Poems 1960-1980.] Journal of Canadian Poetry 1 (1986): 88-91.
- Warner, Patrick. 'Richard Outram and Barbara Howard’s Gauntlet Press: Expanding into the World'. Canadian Literature 217 (Summer 2013): 88-101
- Wells, Zachariah. [Review of South of North: Images of Canada.] Arc 60 (2008): 135.

=== Obituaries and memorial poems ===
- Black, J. D. ‘For Richard Outram’ (poem). Black Velvet Elvis. Erin, Ont.: Porcupine’s Quill, 2006. 39. ISBN 0-88984-277-9
- Clifford, Wayne. ‘In Memoriam: Richard Outram’ (poem). DA: A Journal of the Printing Arts 56 (2005): 44.
- Donaldson, Jeffery. 'LET'. For Richard Outram, in memoriam (poem). Palilalia. Montreal: McGill-Queen's University Press, 2008. p. 73 ISBN 0-7735-3383-4
- Dunphy, Catherine (February 21, 2005). "A poet voiceless without his muse". Toronto Star. p. B5. Archived from the original on November 21, 2007. (obit)
- Heighton, Steven. ‘Outram Lake’ (poem). The New Quarterly 105 (2008): 10-11.
- Kotcheff, Ted. 'Two Moments'. For Richard Outram (poem). The Collected Poems of Ted Kotcheff. ExLibris Corp. 2011. 40. ISBN 978-1456888213
- Martin, Sandra. ‘Richard Outram, Poet (1930-2005).’ (obit) The Globe and Mail 1 Feb. 2005: R5.
- Murray, George. ‘Go’ (poem). The Rush to Here: Poems. Gibsons, B.C.: Nightwood, 2007. 73. ISBN 0-88971-229-8
- Ritchie, Steve. 'A Long Conversation' (song) 2012. Available as digital audio file from http://www.cdbaby.com/cd/steveritchie3
- Sanger, Peter. ‘Walking in Snow’ (poem). Aiken Drum. Kentville, N.S.: Gaspereau, 2006. 76. ISBN 1-55447-014-5
- Zitner, S. P. ‘In Memory of Richard Outram’ (poem). The Hunt on the Lagoon. Fredericton, N.B.: Goose Lane, 2005. 92. ISBN 978-0-86492-446-9
- 'Memorial Tribute for Richard Outram & Barbara Howard', an edited video of the memorial for Outram and Howard recorded at the Arts & Letters Club of Toronto on April 1, 2005. Speakers include film director Ted Kotcheff, literary critic Alberto Manguel and poet Peter Sanger. Friends read from selected poems. Whale paintings by Barbara Howard.

== Musical settings of poems by Richard Outram ==
- South of North (song cycle), set for baritone/mezzo-soprano and piano by Srul Irving Glick; includes the poems "Wilderness on Centre Island", "Vane", "Grace", "Northern River Falls", "Privity", "Stripe", "Congregation at the Shoreline", and "Windmill". The cycle was commissioned by the Arts and Letters Club of Toronto to celebrate the Club’s Ninetieth Anniversary. It was premiered at the Arts and Letters Club on 6 Dec. 1998, performed by James Westman (baritone) and Albert Krywold (piano). It was later recorded in performance at the Great Hall, Hart House (Toronto), by Valerie Sirén (soprano) and Cecilia Ignatieff (piano), October 1999. This recording appears on the Doremi CD Toward the Sun (DDR-71136).
- Spinnaker, a setting of the poem of that title from The Promise of Light, done by composer Roger Bergs at the behest of Hilary and Rosemary Kilbourn, in memory of William Kilbourn. Premiered as part of The Toronto Songbook, a collection of five songs by five Toronto composers, 30 April 2000, in the concert "Toronto, A Musical Century".

== Public collections of the Gauntlet Press ==
- Library and Archives Canada (formerly the National Library of Canada), Ottawa
- The Thomas Fisher Rare Book Library, University of Toronto
- The Gauntlet Press Collection of the Queen Elizabeth II Library, Memorial University of Newfoundland
- Bruce Peel Special Collections Library, University of Alberta
- The University of British Columbia Library
- University of Western Ontario, London, Ontario
- The MILLS Research Collections, McMaster University, Hamilton, Ontario
- The Trent University Archives, Peterborough, Ontario
- The University of Calgary, Alberta, Special Collections
- The Berg Collection, New York Public Library
- The Harris Collection of Poetry and Plays, Brown University, Providence, Rhode Island
- The Library of Congress, Washington, DC
- University at Buffalo, New York, Special Collections
- The Houghton Library, Harvard University, Cambridge, Massachusetts
- Bodleian Library, Oxford, England
- The British Library, London, England
