= April Hickox =

Canadian artist (1955–2025)

- Born: April Ann Hickox; April 24, 1955; Oakville, Ontario, Canada
- Died: August 15, 2025 (aged 70)
- Education: Twickenham College of Technology; Ontario College of Art and Design
- Website: aprilhickox.com

April Ann Hickox (April 24, 1955 – August 15, 2025) was a Canadian lens-based artist, photographer, teacher and curator whose practice included various media, such as photography, film, video and installation.

Hickox once said "I think in my work, I have always worked with history, place and a sense of self, and sometimes language, communication and voice". Her work was often based on narratives which recorded aspects of humanity and nature and explored the relationship between the two with collective memories from human histories and activities.

She was a long-term professor at the Ontario College of Art in Toronto besides being the founding director of Gallery 44 Centre For Contemporary Photography and a founding member of Tenth Muse Studio and Artscape Toronto. She was also a member of the curatorial board of Art With Heart, Casey House, Toronto.

== Background ==
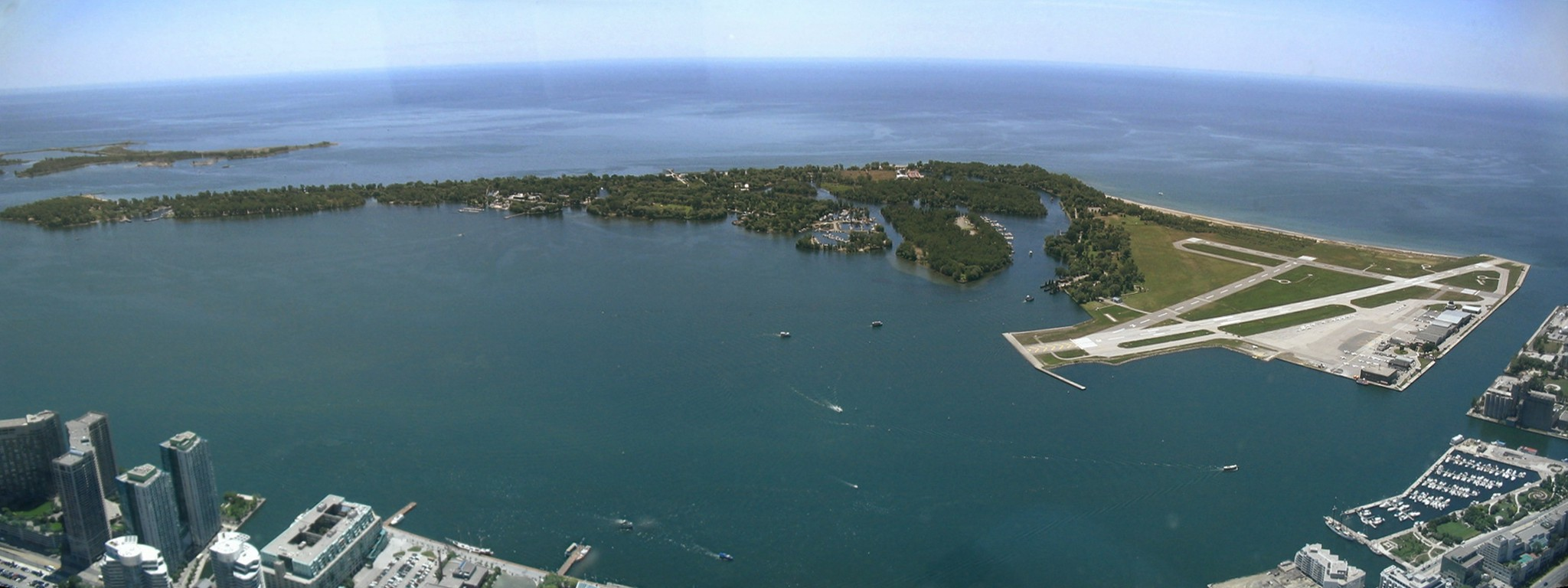
Toronto Islands

Hickox was born in Oakville, Ontario on April 24, 1955. She and her family moved to the Toronto Islands when she was 3 years old.

To continue with her interest in photography, Hickox went to England to study photography and graphic design at Twickenham College of Technology from 1973 to 1974. She returned to Canada for her 5th year graduate studies program at the Ontario College of Art and Design in Toronto, where she obtained an AOCA degree and further explored her interests in photography and printmaking from 1974 to 1978.

Hickox lived afterwards on the Toronto Islands where she derived much of her inspiration. Her personal experiences as a mother of a deaf child also contributed as inspiration for her work, such as her installation work Within Dialogue which showed the visual representation of language and communication across individuals and cultures.

She was an associate professor at the Ontario College of Art and Design University in Toronto and chaired the Photography program from 1998 to 2007. She died of cancer on August 15, 2025, at the age of 70.

== Career ==
During her career as a visual artist, which spanned over 40 years, Hickox explored the differences between personal and public sites through film, video, photography and installation. Her work was based on the narrative histories that individuals gather throughout their lives and the ability of objects to conjure memory. She was also known as a landscape photographer. Her work also reflected her interest in the aspects of the natural world from the climate crisis and environmental issues to land stewardship and our relationship to the natural elements.

Since she lived and worked on the Toronto Islands life-long, she used it as a site of her activity as in works such as Crystal, Porcelain, Glass (2002), a series of photos of broken tea cups or the fragments of various broken objects that were either held by different hands in various positions or repaired and stacked in what appears to be a fragile tower. All of the broken objects belonged to an older woman who had died on the Toronto Islands. They were collected by Hickox from a bridge often called the Free Bridge. In an interview, Hickox described her work as "a recycle of life and change". From this project, Hickox started to think about people who were gone, the houses that were clearly lost and what was left behind. This work eventually led into the series Landscape + Memory: An Island History in 2003.

=== Landscape + Memory ===
Landscape + Memory: An Island History (2003) explored the links between the physical landscape, as it was recently, and memories of that landscape. The photographs record how the land has changed after the demolition of the homes, capturing the remaining flora and landscape that now covers the resident's old home in each photo. Hickox demonstrated this work as the "traces and evidence of the past".

Point Pelee: Landscape and Memory (2004) was commissioned by the Art Gallery of Windsor in 2003. Point Pelee has a similar history to the Toronto Island in that it was once a vibrant community before the land was purchased in the 1970s to develop a national park. Hickox observed the changes that had taken place in the park and documented the overlapping layers of human and natural histories through photography. The exhibition aimed at evoking a dialogue on the "history of our region, environmental issues, and the way in which communities evolve over time".

in Vantage Point – Passing, a body of work of video and still images she created over 17 years, through repetitive image making, she observed and recorded the changes of the overlapping layers of human and natural histories embedded in the landscape. The images record the changes in this landmark. Of this series, she said: "My work strives to question what is 'wild', and how we are renegotiating our relationship with our environment, demonstrating how – with our help – nature is reinvented".

She also acknowledged the city staff who worked on the Islands in a series of life-sized photographs titled Toronto Island Workers (2009–2013). In a CBC interview with Hickox, it was mentioned that the City staff are an important part of the local community who produced the opportunity to relax with their hard works. According to Hickox, these workers should be recognized for their investments in jobs physically, emotionally and spiritually toward building the safe and beautiful environments. In fact, the installations of the works actually made the workers happy by recognizing them instead for their contribution to the city, instead of being invisible to the general public. Hickox was appreciated by the islanders for drawing attention to these workers and reminding them not to take the environment for granted. Hickox and colleagues presented the photographs to the visitors, making the social engagement and interactions between the installed photographs and viewers possible.

== Installation at Donlands Station ==
As part of Toronto Transit Commission's planned art installations at five of its stations, Hickox's work, Field was installed at the Donlands station. Field is a photographic painting on glass comprising the history of the neighbourhood and the development of Withrow Park as an environmental site with its plants and flowers.

== Exhibitions ==
- 1991 Speak, Presentation House Gallery, Vancouver, B.C. 1990; So to Speak, La Centrale (Galerie Powerhouse), Montréal, Quebec;
- 1992 Roses, Wind and Other Stories, Floating Gallery, Winnipeg, Manitoba Roses, W; Wind and Other Stories, Garnet Press, Toronto Roses, Wind and Other Stories, Galerie Séquence, Chicoutimi Roses, Wind and Other Stories, Vu, centre d'animation et de diffusion de la photographie, Québec
- 1993 When the Mind Hears, le mois de la photo, Complexe de la Cité, Montréal;
- 1994 When the Mind Hears, Vu, centre d'animation et de diffusion de la photographie, Québec; When the Mind Hears, part one, Gallery 44 Centre for Contemporary Photography, Toronto; When the Mind Hears, part two, Garnet Press, Toronto; When the Mind Hears, The Photographers Gallery, Saskatoon, Saskatchewan;
- 1995 Dissonance and Voice, installation and outdoor site work, curated by Richard Rhodes, Oakville Galleries, Oakville, Ontario; When the Mind Hears, Tom Thomson Art Gallery, Owen Sound, Ontario; New Works, Thunder Bay Art Gallery, Thunder Bay, Ontario;
- 1996 Excerpts Photography Narrative, centre d'exposition l'imagier, Aylmer, Quebec;
- 1997 Blink, street level photographic installation, Portland and Adelaide Streets, Toronto, Ontario; Utopia/Dystopia, billboard project, Floating Gallery, Winnipeg, Manitoba;
- 1998 Tracings, Prime Gallery, Toronto, Ontario Song, installation, Portland and Richmond Streets, Toronto, Ontario
- 1999 Untitled, site specific installation, Portland and Richmond Streets, Toronto, Ontario;
- 2000 Within Dialogue, an installation at Leo Kamen Gallery, Toronto, Ontario; Within Dialogue, site specific installation, St. Norbert Cultural Centre, Winnipeg, Manitoba;
- 2001 Glance, Leo Kamen Gallery, Project Room, Toronto, Ontario;
- 2002 Porcelain, Crystal, Glass, Main Space, Leo Kamen Gallery, Toronto, Ontario;
- 2003 Landscape and Memory, Main Space, Leo Kamen Gallery, Toronto, Ontario; Landscape and Memory: Point Pelee, an installation at the Art Gallery of Windsor, Windsor, Ontario;
- 2006 Drift, Leo Kamen Gallery, Toronto, Ontario;
- 2008 Ritual, Leo Kamen Gallery, Toronto, Ontario;
- 2009 Gather, an installation of five backlit billboards. Harbourfront Centre, Toronto, Ontario;
- 2010 Compost, Leo Kamen Gallery, Project Room, Toronto, Ontario;
- 2012 Vantage, Main Space, Katsman Kamen Gallery, Toronto, Ontario;
- 2014 Invasive Species, Katsman Contemporary, Toronto, Ontario;
- 2016 April Hickox: Variations Primaries, Surrey Art Gallery;
- 2025 Taking Root: Recent Acquisitions, Art Gallery of Hamilton;

== Community involvement ==
Hickox served as a member of several charitable and academic organizations in Toronto from 1997 to 2013. In 1997, Hickox served as a founding member of Gallery 44 Center for Contemporary Photography, a non-profit studio in Toronto and held the position of director for seven years. Gallery 44 is an artist-run initiative whose mission statement is providing affordable resources to support photography-based artists.

Hickox was also a founding member of the Toronto-based Tenth Muse Studio, and Artscape and served as a committee member for the Founding board of directors in 1998. Through Artscape, Hickox directed artists' residencies and studio rentals on Toronto Islands under the Gibraltar Point Centre for the Arts.

From 1997 to 2000, Hickox was the Advisor and Training Coordinator for Arts and Crafts at Silent Voice Camp for the Deaf, in honour of Alex, her deaf daughter. Simultaneously she became a part of the Mentoring Artists for Women's Art in Manitoba, Canada. From 2010 to 2011, Hickox was responsible for building an online art collection as part of her role as guest curator for the Line Art Auction held by the LGBT Youth Line at the Art Gallery of Ontario Between 2010 and 2013, Hickox held the position of committee member for Project 31, a fundraising auction that supports OCAD University. In 2013, Hickox also fulfilled the committee membership role as the Co-Curatorial Chair for the Art with Heart event at the Casey House Fundraising auction of Canadian Contemporary Art to support HIV/AIDS.

In 2021, she was among the participants in John Greyson's experimental short documentary film International Dawn Chorus Day.

== Public collections ==
Works by Hickox are held in the following public art galleries and funding agencies:

- the Art Gallery of Peterborough;
- the Art Gallery of Hamilton;
- the Kitchener-Waterloo Art Gallery;
- the Canada Council Art Bank;
- the Canadian Museum of Contemporary Photography, National Gallery of Canada, Ottawa;
- the Winnipeg Art Gallery;
- the Agnes Etherington Art Centre; and
- the Burnaby Art Gallery.
