= Rosemary Kilbourn =

Canadian printmaker (1931–2025)

- Kilbourn working with her etching tools (2011)
- Born: April 3, 1931; Toronto, Ontario, Canada
- Died: July 26, 2025 (aged 94); Brampton, Ontario, Canada
- Education: Ontario College of Art (1953)
- Known for: Wood engraver and stained glass artist
- Elected: Royal Canadian Academy of Arts, Society of Wood Engravers

Rosemary Kilbourn RCA (April 3, 1931 – July 26, 2025), was a Canadian printmaker, illustrator and stained glass artist known for her work in wood engraving.

== Early life and education ==
Born in Toronto, Canada, Kilbourn was drawn to art at an early age. She was especially inspired by the work of Emily Carr, whom she met during a family visit to Victoria, British Columbia.

Kilbourn went on to attend high school at Havergal College and later pursued painting at the Ontario College of Art, graduating in 1953. That same year, she travelled to London, England to further her studies in portrait painting. While there, she was introduced to wood engraving and purchased her first set of burin tools before returning to Toronto in the mid-1950s.

Upon her return, Kilbourn’s former painting instructor, Will Ogilvie, invited her and other graduates to sketch En plein air near Palgrave, Ontario. Inspired by local painters such as David Milne, Kilbourn began to look for a place of her own. In 1957, she purchased a former schoolhouse built in 1872, no longer in use and locally known as the Dingle School.

Tucked into the Niagara Escarpment in Caledon East, the Dingle Schoolhouse and its surrounding landscape became the heart of Kilbourn’s artistic practice. The location served as her primary subject matter, and she lived and worked there until 2019.

== Painting and wood engraving ==
One of Kilbourn's first commissions was a mural for the new dining hall at the University of Western Ontario. In addition to commissioned portraits, her early work included book illustration using wood engraving. She illustrated two books by her brother, William Kilbourn The Firebrand (1956); The Elements Combined (1960); and Farley Mowat's, The Desperate People (1959). Kilbourn worked actively in wood engraving from the 1960s through the 1980s. In addition to traditional book-sized engravings, she experimented with unconventional formats, using large wood blocks to create both landscape and figure compositions, which she printed by hand and with a press.

In 1976 she illustrated Florence Wyle's collection of poems Shadow of the Year published by Aliquando Press. Her wood engraving based on Frederick Philip Grove's Fruits of the Earth was featured on a Canadian memorial 17-cent stamp in 1979. Recently, with Anne Corkett, she selected poems by Richard Outram to accompany illustrations by Thoreau MacDonald, a work commissioned by the Arts and Letters Club in Toronto: South of North: Images of Canada by Richard Outram with drawings by Thoreau MacDonald (2007). In 2012 The Porcupine's Quill published Out of the Wood, a collection of eighty reproductions of wood engravings by Kilbourn, done over a period of fifty years, accompanied by short, elegiac fragments of text that elucidate her unique and influential aesthetic. Some of the reproductions fold out into a double spread; 'Out of the Wood' also includes a full-size reproduction of The Obedience of Noah, which gives an example of the large scale of some of Kilbourn's work.

== Stained glass work ==
In the late 1960s Kilbourn began to create stained glass window commissions for churches, including windows for St. Thomas's Anglican Church, Toronto where she illustrated one of T.S. Eliot's poems from the Four Quartets. Other windows include those in St. Bartholomew's Anglican Church in Ottawa.; St. Timothy's Anglican Church, Toronto; St. Michael and All Angels Anglican Church, Toronto; St. James' Cathedral Church, Toronto and Trinity Anglican Church, Ottawa, among others.

== Personal life and death ==
Kilbourn lived and worked in an old schoolhouse, known as the "Dingle Schoolhouse", in the Albion Hills from 1957 onwards, and taught at the Artists' Workshop in Toronto, Central Technical School, and McMaster University. Kilbourn died on July 26, 2025, at the age of 94.

== Honours and awards ==
In 1977 Kilbourn was elected to the Royal Canadian Academy of Arts, and to England's Society of Wood Engravers in 2001. Her name was entered in Havergal College's Hall of Distinction in 2004.

== Exhibitions ==
Kilbourn's work was featured in exhibitions at the National Gallery of Canada in 1966 and 1969. She participated in exhibitions with the British Society of Relief Block Printers from 1973 to 1975. A survey exhibition of Kilbourn's work was held at the Art Gallery of Hamilton in 2018–19.

== Collections ==
- Montreal Museum of Fine Art
- Art Gallery of Greater Victoria
- Art Gallery of Hamilton
- Art Gallery of Peel
- Kitchener-Waterloo Art Gallery
- McMaster University
- University of Guelph
- University of Regina
- University of Calgary
- Thomas Fisher Rare Book Library
