= Lyne Lapointe =

French-Canadian artist (born 1957)

Lyne Lapointe (born 1957) is a French-Canadian artist. Her work ranges from site-specific installations (1981–1995), found-objects, drawings, and paintings, with focuses on art history, museology, botany, and feminism. She has exhibited extensively in Montreal, Quebec, and New York City, New York, and across Canada. She now lives and works in Mansonville, Quebec.

== Early life ==
She was born in Montreal, Quèbec. Lapointe studied art history and visual arts at Old Montreal and Rosemont colleges, and in 1978 attained a Bachelor of Fine Art at Carleton University of Ottawa.

== Career ==
=== Collaboration with Martha Fleming (1981-1995) ===
Throughout the 1980s and early 1990s, Lapointe lived and worked in Montreal with collaborative partner Martha Fleming. The two were together from 1981 to 1995.

Lapointe and Fleming's collaborations were rooted in the politics of radical feminism, marginalization, and museum practices. Their works combined site-specific histories, art historical references, female sexuality and desire, and botany, in order to critically analyze social politics. The two ended their relationship in 1995.

==== Site-Specific Installation ====
From 1981 to 1995 Lapointe and Fleming executed several site-specific installations in politically charged architectural and abandoned buildings across Montreal, New York City, and São Paulo. Addressing systemic marginalization with museum and gallery practices through a feminist lens, these installations engaged the social issues historically embedded at such sites. (such as Casa Yaya, home of 1887 Dona Sebastiana de Mello Freire; These The Pearls, London; Duda, The Library in Emir Mohammed Park, Madrid; La Donna Deliquenta, Vaudeville Theatre, Montreal).

==== Studiolo ====
In 1997, The Musee d’Art Contemporain exhibited a retrospective for Lapointe and Fleming titled, "Studiolo". The exhibit marked their 15-year collaboration, showcasing their polemic research and creative processes. Complementary to the retrospective was a publication, also Studiolo, which represented the political and philosophical frameworks from which they worked. The exhibit was subsequently exhibited at the Art Gallery of Windsor in 1998, invited by curator (at the time) Helga Pakasaar.

==== Other collaborative work ====
- La Musée de Science, Montreal, Québec (1984)
- Eat Me/Love Me/Feed Me, New York City, New York (1989)
- La Salpetrière, (re-exhibited at Susan Hobbs Gallery 1995)
- HANGING, from the Musèe de Science, and antique book covers displayed at the Book Museum in Bath, England, displayed at Susan Hobbs Gallery (1995)
- Déjà Voodoo, Montreal, Québec, 1996

== 1995- ==
=== La Perle, Carlton University ===
In 2007, Carlton University Art Gallery held a solo exhibition for Lapointe titled, La Perle. The exhibit engaged Lapointe's interest of sound, optics, and museum history, with 23 individual works of painting, drawings, and found-objects. The installation of works, drawn from images of botany, medical, art-historical sources and encyclopedias, were intended to challenge practices of museology and display methods.

=== Selected works: La Pierre Patiente ===
In 2011, the Pierre-Francois Oulette Art Contemporain exhibited 7 selected paintings from Lapointe's series La Pierre Patiente (The Patient Stone). Lapointe used acupuncture needles, formally intended to reestablish a human internal balance of energy, to address the tension between humans’ link to the environment and other species. These works were painted on glass with phosphorescent pigments (a technique seen in earlier works), to suggest the shift between light and darkness, and the fragility of memory and disembodiment.

=== Further exhibitions ===
- Lyne Lapointe, Susan Hobbs Gallery (2003)
- Musee d’Art Contemporain exhibited a survey of Lapointe's work, Montreal, Quebec, 2002
- La Clef, SBC Gallery of Contemporary Art, 2008
- Cabinet, Musée d'art de Joliette, Quebec (2011); Sporobole, Sherbrooke, Quebec (2010)

In 2021, she was one of the participants in John Greyson's experimental short documentary film International Dawn Chorus Day.

== Recognition ==
- Conseil des Art et des Lettres du Quebec (1983)
- Pollock Krasner Foundation, New York (1997)
- Prix Graff (1998)
- Canada Council for the Arts (2008).

Her work is collected in Canadian art institutes. She is represented by Roger Bellemare/Christian Lambert Gallery in Montreal, and has artworks at the Jack Shainman Gallery in New York City.
