= John Knight (artist) =

American artist (born 1945)

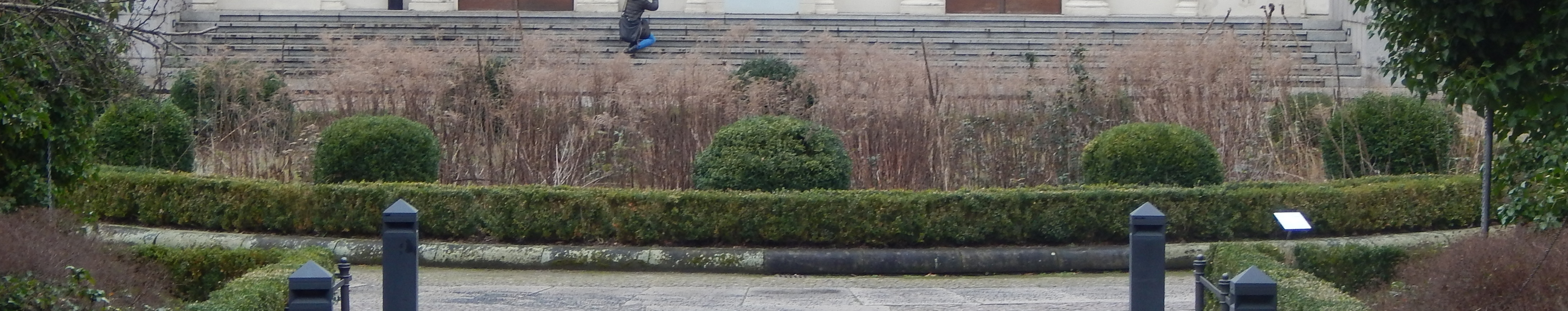
The Right to be Lazy, Hamburger Bahnhof

John Knight (born 1945 in Hollywood, California) is a conceptual artist in Los Angeles, California who works in situ. Since the 1960s, Knight has made works grounded in site-specificity and institutional critique, works that interrogate underlying economic systems.

== Exhibitions ==
=== Solo ===
- John Knight – Enkele Werken, formerly known as Witte de With Center for Contemporary Art, Rotterdam (1990).
- Espai d’art contemporani de Castelló, Castellón (2008).
- John Knight, Autotypes, A Work in Situ, Greene Naftali (2011)
- Portikus, Frankfurt (2013)
- Cabinet Gallery at Fitzpatrick-Leland House, Los Angeles (2014)
- Art Institute of Chicago (2015)
- John Knight, A Work in Situ, Ground Floor, Greene Naftali (2015)
- John Knight, A work in situ, Redcat, Los Angeles (2016)
- John Knight, Vacant Possession, Cabinet, London (2016)

=== Group ===
- Whitney Biennial, Whitney Museum, New York (2012)

== Publications ==
- John Knight, Cold Cuts, Espai d’art contemporani de Castelló, Castellón (2009)
- John Knight, Autotypes, Greene Naftali (2011)
- John Knight, Quiet Quality, Cabinet Gallery (2013)
- John Knight (October Files), MIT Press, Cambridge (2014)
