= Peter Sanger =

Canadian poet and writer (born 1943)

Peter Sanger (born 1943) is a Canadian poet and prose writer. Sanger, who is also described as a critic and an editor, was born in Bewdley, Worcestershire, England, and immigrated to Canada in 1953. He was educated at the University of Melbourne, University of Victoria, and Acadia University. He lived and worked in Ontario, British Columbia and Newfoundland before settling in Nova Scotia in 1970 and teaching at the Nova Scotia Agricultural College, where he became Head of the Humanities and Professor Emeritus.

Sanger's first book, The America Reel, was published by Pottersfield Press in 1983. This collection was followed by five poetry collections including Earth Moth (1991), Ironworks (2001) and Kerf (2002). Sanger has published collections of poetry and essays and has edited the works of Canadian poet John Thompson. He has also reviewed work by Douglas Lochhead, Richard Outram, Robert Bringhurst, Thompson, Emily Carr and Elizabeth Bishop. Sanger has been the poetry editor for Nova Scotia literary journal The Antigonish Review since 1985.

== Bibliography ==
Poetry:

- The America Reel. Porter's Lake, NS: Pottersfield Press, 1983.
- Earth Moth. Fredericton, N.B.: Goose Lane Editions, 1991.
- The Third Hand, with Thaddeus Holownia. Jolicure, NB: Anchorage Press, 1994.
- Ironworks. Platinum Prints by Thaddeus Holownia, Poems by Peter Sanger. Sackville, NB: Anchorage Press 1995; trade ed. 2001. ISBN 1-895488-18-4
- After Monteverdi. Sackville, NB: Harrier Editions, 1997.
- Kerf. Kentville, N.S.: Gaspereau Press, 2002. ISBN 978-1-894031-53-0
- Arborealis. With photographs by Thaddeus Holownia. Sackville, N.: Anchorage Press, 2005. ISBN 1-895488-26-5
- Aiken Drum. Kentville, NS: Gaspereau Press, 2006. ISBN 978-1-55447-014-3
- John Stokes' Horse. Kentville, NS.: Gaspereau Press, 2012. ISBN 978-1-55447-113-3
- Fireship: Early Poems - 1965-1991. Kentville, NS.: Gaspereau Press, 2013. ISBN 9781554471218

Prose:

- Sea Run: Notes on John Thompson's Stilt Jack. Antigonish, NS: Xavier Press, 1986.
- As the Eyes of Lyncaeus: A Celebration for Douglas Lochhead. Sackville, NB: Anchorage Press, 1990.
- "Her Kindled Shadow ...", An Introduction to the Work of Richard Outram, The Antigonish Review, 2001. ISBN 0-920653-05-7
- Spar: Words in Place. Kentville, N.S.: Gaspereau Press, 2002. ISBN 978-1-894031-54-7
- Walden Pond Revisited, with Thaddeus Holownia. Sackville, NB: Anchorage Press, 2004.
- White Salt Mountain: Words in Time. Kentville, NS.: Gaspereau Press, 2005. ISBN 978-1-55447-004-4
- The Stone Canoe: Two Lost Mi'kmaq Texts (with Elizabeth Paul & Alan Syliboy). Kentville, N.S.: Gaspereau Press, 2007. ISBN 978-1-55447-043-3
- Laminae, with Thaddeus Holownia. Sackville, NB: Anchorage Press, 2007
- Through Darkling Air: The Poetry of Richard Outram. Kentville, NS: Gaspereau Press, 2010. Literary biography and criticism. ISBN 978-1-55447-061-7
- Water, with Thaddeus Holownia. Sackville, NB: Anchorage Press, 2012.
- Oikos. Kentville, N.S.: Gaspereau Press, 2014. Essay. ISBN 9781554471256
- Of Things Unknown: Critical Essays, 1978–2005. Kentville, N.S.: Gaspereau Press, 2015. Literary Criticism. ISBN 9781554471508
- Lightfield: The Photography of Thaddeus Holownia. Kentville, N.S.: Gaspereau Press, 2018. Photography, Essays. ISBN 9781554471775

As Editor:

- John Thompson: Collected Poems and Translations. Fredericton, N.B.: Goose Lane, 1995.
- Divisions of the Heart: Elizabeth Bishop and the Art of Memory and Place. Gwendolyn Davies, Sandra Berry, and Peter Sanger, eds. Kentville, N.S.: Gaspereau Press, 2001. ISBN 978-1-894031-31-8
- Working in the Dark: Homage to John Thompson, with Thaddeus Holownia. Jolicure, NB: Anchorage Press, 2014.
