= St. Bartholomew's Anglican Church (Ottawa) =

Coordinates: 45.426675°N 75.685099°W

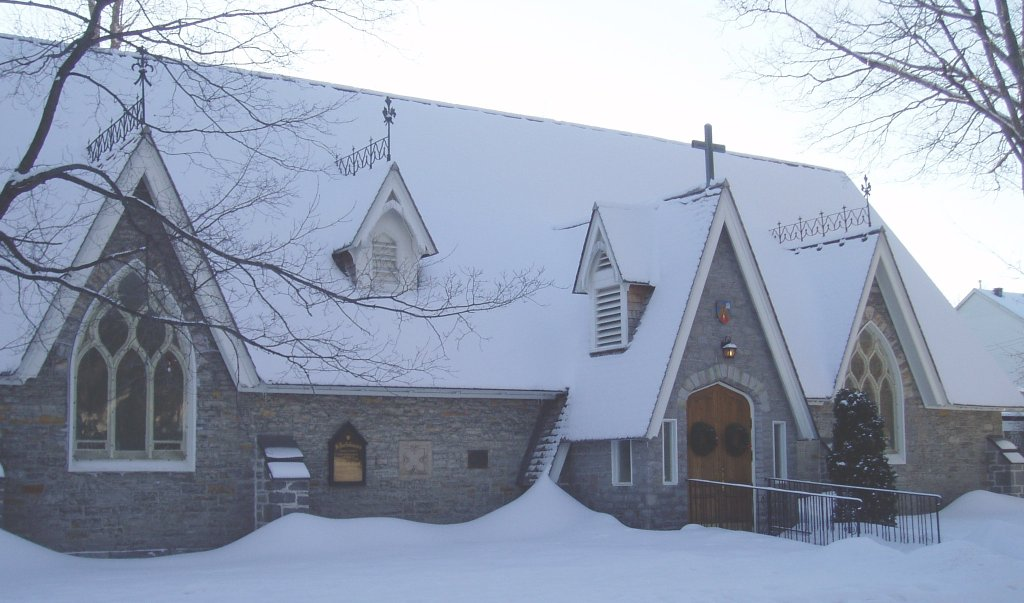
- St. Bartholomew's Anglican Church Ottawa, Ontario
- St. Bartholomew's Anglican Church
- Location: 125 MacKay Street; Ottawa, Ontario; K1M 2B4
- Denomination: Anglican Church of Canada
- Website: stbartsottawa.ca

History
- Dedication: St. Bartholomew

Administration
- Province: Ecclesiastical Province of Ontario
- Diocese: Anglican Diocese of Ottawa

St. Bartholomew's Anglican Church is a place of worship in Ottawa, Ontario, Canada. The building was constructed in the latter half of the 19th century and serves the surrounding neighbourhoods. Additionally, St. Bartholomew's is, due to its location next to Rideau Hall, the place of worship for various Governors General of Canada (whether or not of the Anglican faith) and some members of the Canadian Royal Family. It is also the regimental chapel of the Governor General's Foot Guards.

== The church ==
St. Bartholomew's is located on MacKay Street, in the New Edinburgh neighbourhood of Ottawa, and serves, besides New Edinburgh, Rockcliffe Park, Lindenlea, and Ottawa. Across the street from St. Bartholomew's is Rideau Hall, the official residence of the Canadian monarch and Governor General of Canada. A viceregal pew is reserved for the governor general and their family—the most recent governor general to have used the pew regularly was Adrienne Clarkson. Additionally, St. Bartholomew's is the regimental chapel of the Governor General's Foot Guards and has thus become known as the Guard's Chapel.

The Ottawa Window, a three-light window designed by Wilhelmina Geddes as a war memorial, was presented on Sunday, 9 November 1919, by Governor General Prince Arthur, Duke of Connaught and Strathearn, in memory of the members of his staff who died during the First World War. An inscribed photograph of Lieutenant-Colonel Farquhar and Captain Buller is displayed on the wall by the entrance to the Church from the parish hall. Other stained glass windows include one by Rosemary Kilbourn.

The church also has a relationship with the Princess Patricia's Canadian Light Infantry (PPCLI). A memorial plaque is dedicated "[t]o the memory of The Lady Patricia Ramsey, VA, CI, CD late Colonel-in-Chief Princess Patricia's Canadian Light Infantry who as H.R.H. The Princess Patricia of Connaught worhsipped here while resident at Government House 1911-1916." The Duke of Devonshire, a former governor general, decided that the pew immediately behind the viceregal one should be the Patricia Pew, kept for members of the PPCLI. A regimental plaque, presented in November 1980, is located on the Patricia Pew.

== History ==
With the motivational and financial backing of Governor General the Viscount Monck, the parish was founded on 14 August (St. Bartholomew's Day) 1867. Land was donated from the estate of Thomas McKay (the former owner of Rideau Hall) and the St. Lawrence Railway and the building, completed in 1868, was designed by Thomas Seaton Scott, who was the architect of a number of other prominent Ottawa structures. Monck laid the corner stone on 9 May 1868 and the first service was held on Christmas Day, though the interiors remained unfinished. The furnishings were later augmented by the Marchioness of Dufferin and Ava.

People who have preached or performed at St. Bartholomew's include Charles Kingsley on Easter Day, 1874, and Dame Nellie Melba in December 1915. Four years later, Prince Edward, Prince of Wales (later King Edward VIII), dedicated the Connaught Window, memorialising his great-uncle, Prince Arthur, Duke of Connaught and Strathearn.

== See also ==
- List of designated heritage properties in Ottawa
