= Christian Philipp Müller =

Swiss artist (born 1957)

- Born: 1957 (age 68–69); Biel, Switzerland
- Notable work: Green Border (1993); Carl Theodors Garten in Düsseldorf-Hellerhof; Kleiner Führer durch die ehemalige Kurfürstliche Gemäldegalerie (1986)
- Movement: Conceptual Art; Institutional Critique
- Awards: Prix Meret Oppenheim (2016)
- Website: https://christianphilippmueller.ch/

Christian Philipp Müller (born 2 November 1957) is a Swiss artist.

== Education and early work ==
Müller was born in Biel/Bienne, Switzerland, and attended the Farbe und Form (F+F) in Zurich from 1982 to 1983, where he studied Fine Arts and graphic design. From 1984 to 1989, he studied Fine Arts at the Kunstakademie Düsseldorf, where he was a Master Student of Prof. Fritz Schwegler and Tutor to Prof. Kasper König.

His first exhibition at Galerie Christian Nagel, Köln–Düsseldorf (Cologne–Düsseldorf), took place in Cologne in 1990. The next year, he had his first solo museum exhibition, Fixed Values (1991), at the Palais de Beaux-Arts, Brussels. For this exhibition, he presented a retrospective of his work.

=== Solo exhibitions ===
In 1993, the commissioner of the 45th Venice Biennale invited Gerwald Rockenschaub to represent Austria alongside non-Austrians Müller (Switzerland) and Andrea Fraser (USA). Müller removed the pavilion's garden wall and redesigned the landscape of its sculpture garden for his contribution, Green Border (1993). The work was a comment on transgressing national borders, which he physically enacted by illegally hiking across Austria’s borders with the Czech Republic, Slovakia, Hungary, Slovenia, Italy, Switzerland, Liechtenstein, and Germany.
