= International Dawn Chorus Day (film) =

2021 Canadian short experimental documentary film

- Directed by: John Greyson
- Written by: John Greyson
- Produced by: John Greyson
- Starring: Shady Habash; Sarah Hegazi
- Edited by: Kalil Haddad
- Production company: Greyzone
- Distributed by: V Tape
- Release date: June 15, 2021 (Berlin)
- Running time: 15 minutes
- Country: Canada
- Language: English

International Dawn Chorus Day is a 2021 Canadian short experimental documentary film, directed by John Greyson. Taking its name from the observance of International Dawn Chorus Day, when people are encouraged to listen to birdsong, the film features the participation of 40 international filmmakers and artists who recorded birdsong for a Zoom call in tribute to deceased Egyptian activists Shady Habash and Sarah Hegazi.

Participants included Sofia Bohdanowicz, AA Bronson, Julie Burleigh, Shu Lea Cheang, Sheila Davis, Richard Fung, Rebecca Garrett, Shohini Ghosh, Maureen Greyson, Sharon Hayashi, DeeDee Halleck, Nelson Henricks, April Hickox, Michelle Jacques, Nancy Kim, Prabha Khosla, Lyne Lapointe, Stephen Lawson, Jack Lewis, Catherine Lord, Loring McAlpin, Alexis Mitchell, Maki Mizukoshi, Ken Morrison, Daniel Negatu, Martha Newbigging, Jane Park, Pamela Rodgerson, Su Rynard, Lior Shamriz, Amil Shivji, Cheryl Sourkes, Dieylani Sow, Richard Tillmann, Almerinda Travassos, David Wall, BH Yael, and three Egyptian personalities who contributed anonymously due to the risk of political retribution by the government of Egypt.

The film premiered in the short film program at the 71st Berlin International Film Festival, where it won the Teddy Award for best LGBTQ-themed short film.
