= Carol Sawyer =

Carol Sawyer is Canadian contemporary visual artist who works with photography, installation, video, and improvised music. Her work often addresses memory and the construction of history.

== Education ==
Sawyer earned an Honours Diploma in Photography from Emily Carr University of Art and Design in 1982 and an Interdisciplinary Master of Fine Arts (Visual Art, Music, Theatre) from Simon Fraser University in 1998.

== Professional activities ==
Sawyer has served as a board member for the Canadian Photographic Portfolio Society, Or Gallery, and the Western Front, and has taught as a sessional instructor at Emily Carr University of Art and Design and Simon Fraser University's School for the Contemporary Arts. Sawyer has received numerous BC Arts Council and Canada Council grants and has been an artist-in-residence at the Western Front and the Banff Centre for the Arts. In 2018 Canada Council for the Arts awarded Sawyer the prestigious Duke and Duchess of York Prize in Photography. Her work is included in the collections of the Canada Council Art Bank (Ottawa), the City of Vancouver, Microsoft Corporation (Seattle) and the Museum of Fine Arts (Houston).

== Art practice ==
Carol Sawyer is active in a wide array of disciplines. The following is a selected list of her artistic projects.

=== Natalie Brettschneider ===
Sawyer conducts research and makes artwork that enriches the Natalie Brettschneider Archive, a genre-defying fictional Canadian artist active in the early 20th-century. Brettschneider's life - as seen through letters, photographs, paintings and film - intersects with and brings light to a rich community of interdisciplinary women artists working in Canada and abroad. When Sawyer began this project in the 1990s, very little had been written about the women involved in Dada and surrealist movements. This project helps shed light on the ways that male artists have dominated art history.

=== Amazonia ===
Sawyer created another artistic persona, a comic book superheroine named Amazonia, in the 1998 Artspeak Gallery publication Carol Sawyer As Amazonia. This playful character wears a silver and blue costume, and has the power of flight.

=== The Scholar's Study: Still Life ===
This single-channel video projection draws from footage Sawyer shot while dismantling the home office of her late father, Alan R. Sawyer, a prominent scholar of pre-Columbian Andean and Peruvian art. Over the course of nearly a year, Sawyer's camera recorded the slow withdrawal of her father's presence from a room where he had spent countless hours, as hundreds of historical artifacts, slides, and his library and professional papers, were carefully photographed, catalogued, and archived.

=== Shadow Puppet ===
Exhibited in 2015 at Republic Gallery, Vancouver, and again in 2017 at the same gallery as part of UTOPIAS CONSTRUCTED III, this video installation and group of photographs document a series of short performances in which Sawyer uses cardboard and plastic to turn herself into a life-sized shadow puppet.

=== I attempt from love's sickness to fly, in vain ===
Exhibited in 2017 at Republic Gallery in Vancouver, BC, in conjunction with the Capture Festival of Photography, this project is a video and group of photographs based on an aria written by English Baroque composer Henry Purcell.

=== ion Zoo ===
Since the late 1990s Sawyer has performed as a vocalist with the avant-garde, improvisational, jazz-influenced music group ion Zoo. Their albums include Set Free at the Cellar and Venus Looks Good. ion Zoo was also commissioned by Los Angeles-based composer Michael Vlatkovich and Albuquerque-based poet Mark Weber to record the album Elasticity.

=== Voxy ===
Along with singer Kate Hammett-Vaughan, from 2007 to 2016 Sawyer ran an annual workshop series about improvisation for singers.

== Selected exhibitions, installations, and performances ==
- The Little-Known Repertoire of Brettschneider and Piscator (Performance), Western Front, Vancouver, B.C., 17 October 1998.
- Carol Sawyer: The Natalie Brettschneider Archive, Vancouver Art Gallery, 2017-18.
- I attempt from love’s sickness to fly, in vain, Republic Gallery, 2017.
- The Natalie Brettschneider Archive, Art Gallery of Greater Victoria, 2016.
- Carol Sawyer: The Natalie Brettschneider Archive, Carleton University Art Gallery, 2016.
- Wood Work, City of Vancouver Public Art, 2011.
- Trace Ingredients, (Public art commission, exhibit and performance that was part of Memory Palace: Three artists in the Library), Vancouver Public Library, Central Branch, 2008.
- Aperture, City of Vancouver Public Art, 2008.
- Cambie Picture Cycle, City of Vancouver Public Art, 2004.
- Tribute to the Cambie Works Yard, City of Vancouver Public Art, 2004.
- Ophelia, The Contemporary Art Gallery (Vancouver), 1996-97.
