= Thoreau MacDonald =

Canadian artist (1901–1989)

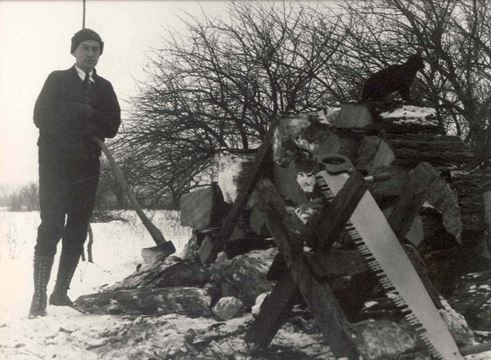
- Thoreau MacDonald at his home in Thornhill, c. 1950
- Born: April 21, 1901; Toronto, Ontario
- Died: May 30, 1989 (aged 88); Toronto
- Known for: artist

Thoreau MacDonald (April 21, 1901 – May 30, 1989) was a Canadian illustrator, graphic and book designer, and artist.

== Career ==
MacDonald was the son of Group of Seven member J. E. H. MacDonald. He was self-taught, but had worked on commercial art with his father, who was famous for his work in design. Thoreau MacDonald was colour blind and as a result he worked primarily in black and white.

MacDonald's contribution was mainly to the history of the area of graphic art in Canada and the United States. As an illustrator, MacDonald worked for Ryerson Press; Dartmouth College in Hanover, New Hampshire; the Canadian Forum magazine for which he designed many covers; and on books in general, including those from his private press. (In 1933 MacDonald launched Woodchuck Press, his own imprint for which he provided some text, illustrations, and design (it lasted until 1946)).

He considered his finest book to be Maria Chapdelaine by Louis Hémon for Macmillan Company (1938). He also designed lettering, and did paintings, watercolours and drawings. His work is found in the National Gallery of Canada in Ottawa, Hart House at the University of Toronto, the Art Gallery of Ontario, and the McMichael Canadian Art Collection among other collections. There was one major exhibition of his work in Canada during his lifetime in 1952 at Museum London (then called the London Public Library and Art Museum). In 1972, he was made an Honorary Life member of the Society of Ontario Naturalists whose cause he considered he had served life-long.

His former home and 4-acre (16,000 m^{2}) garden in Vaughan, Ontario, which he inherited from his father, was donated to the City of Vaughan in 1974. The building and grounds have been restored and are open to the public.

Thoreau Mcdonald's fonds is in the E.P. Taylor Research Library & Archives, Art Gallery of Ontario, Toronto, Thoreau MacDonald Collection CA OTAG SC104.

== Artworks ==
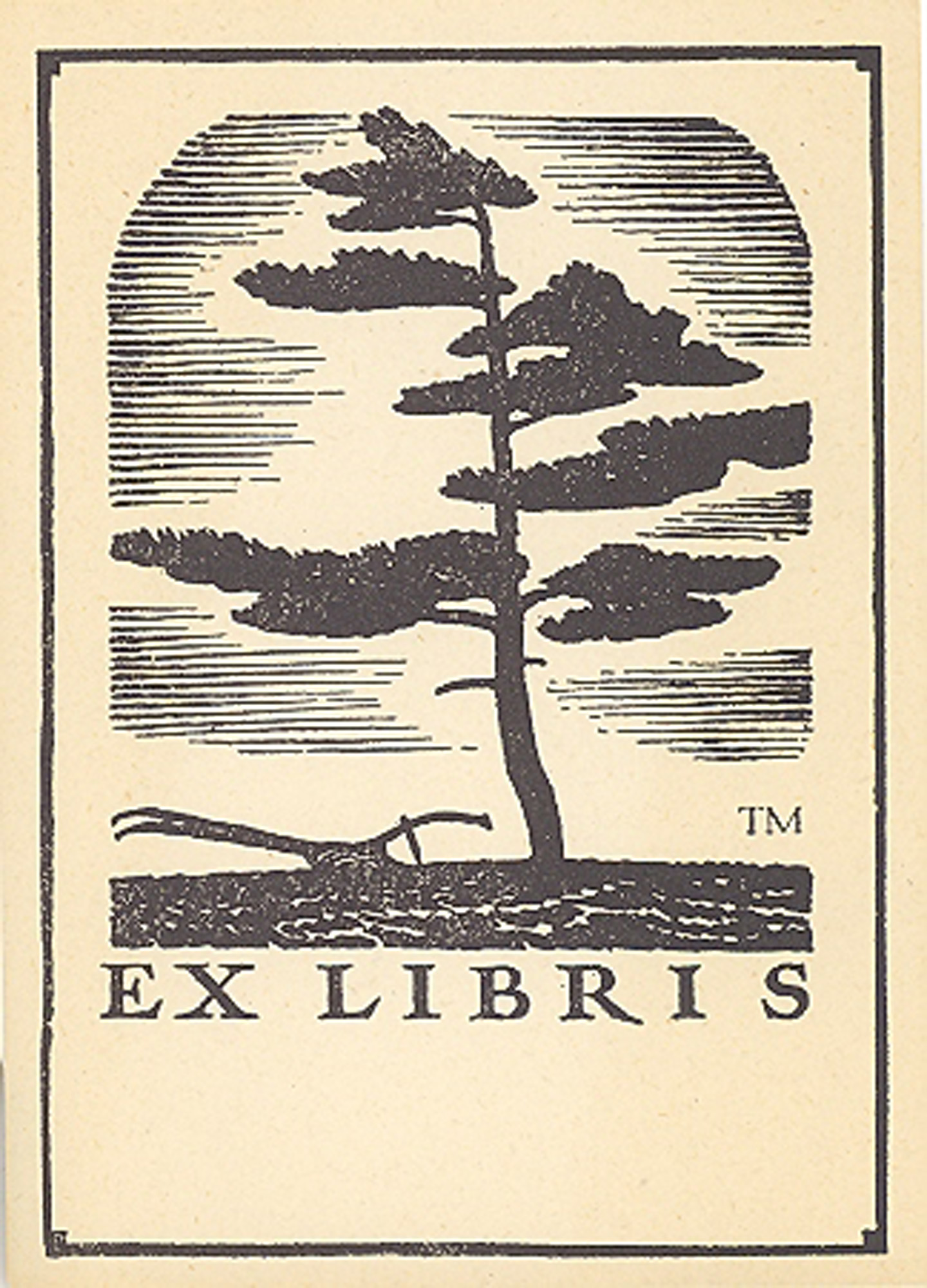
Bookplate designed by Thoreau MacDonald. University of British Columbia. Library. Rare Books and Special Collections. Thomas Murray Collection

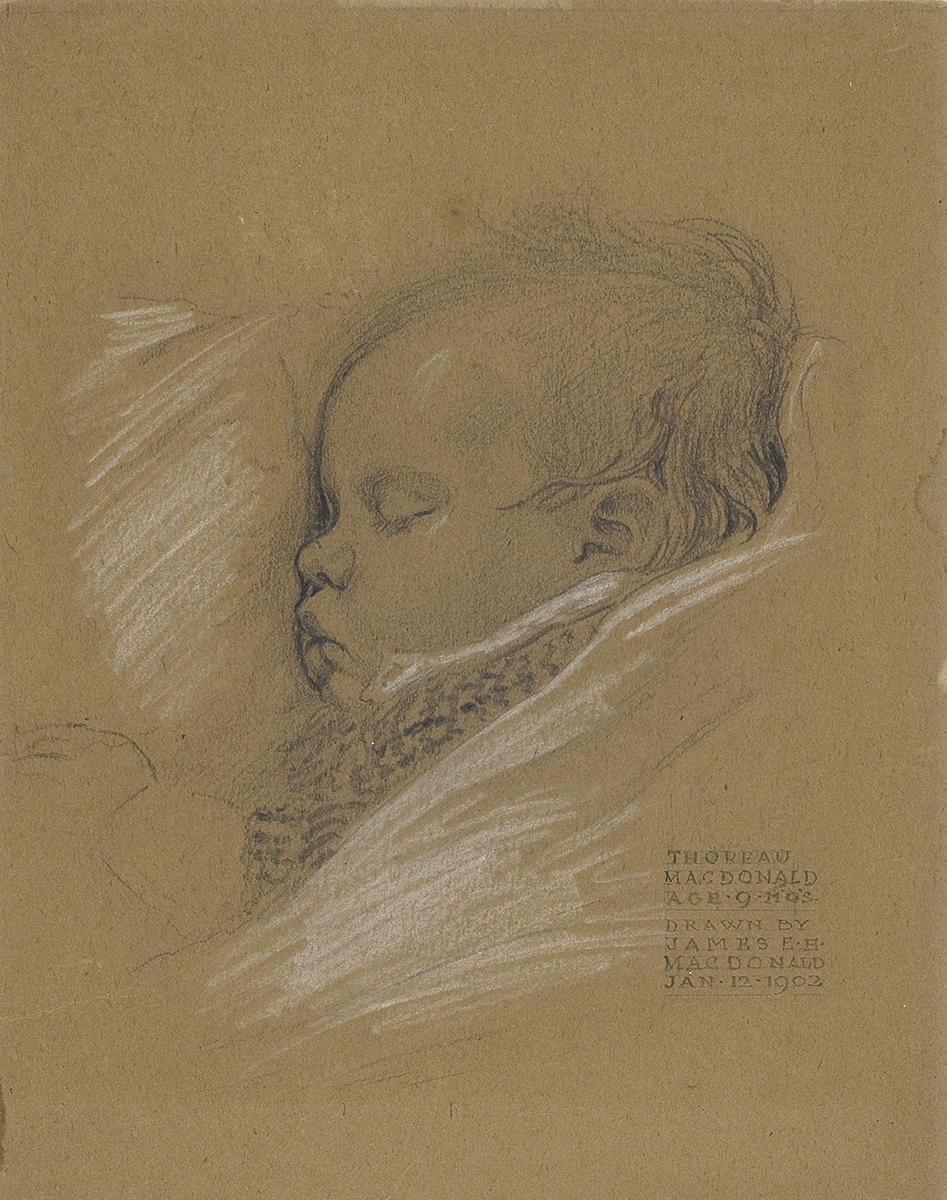
J. E. H. MacDonald, Thoreau MacDonald, January 12, 1902. McMichael Canadian Art Collection, Kleinburg

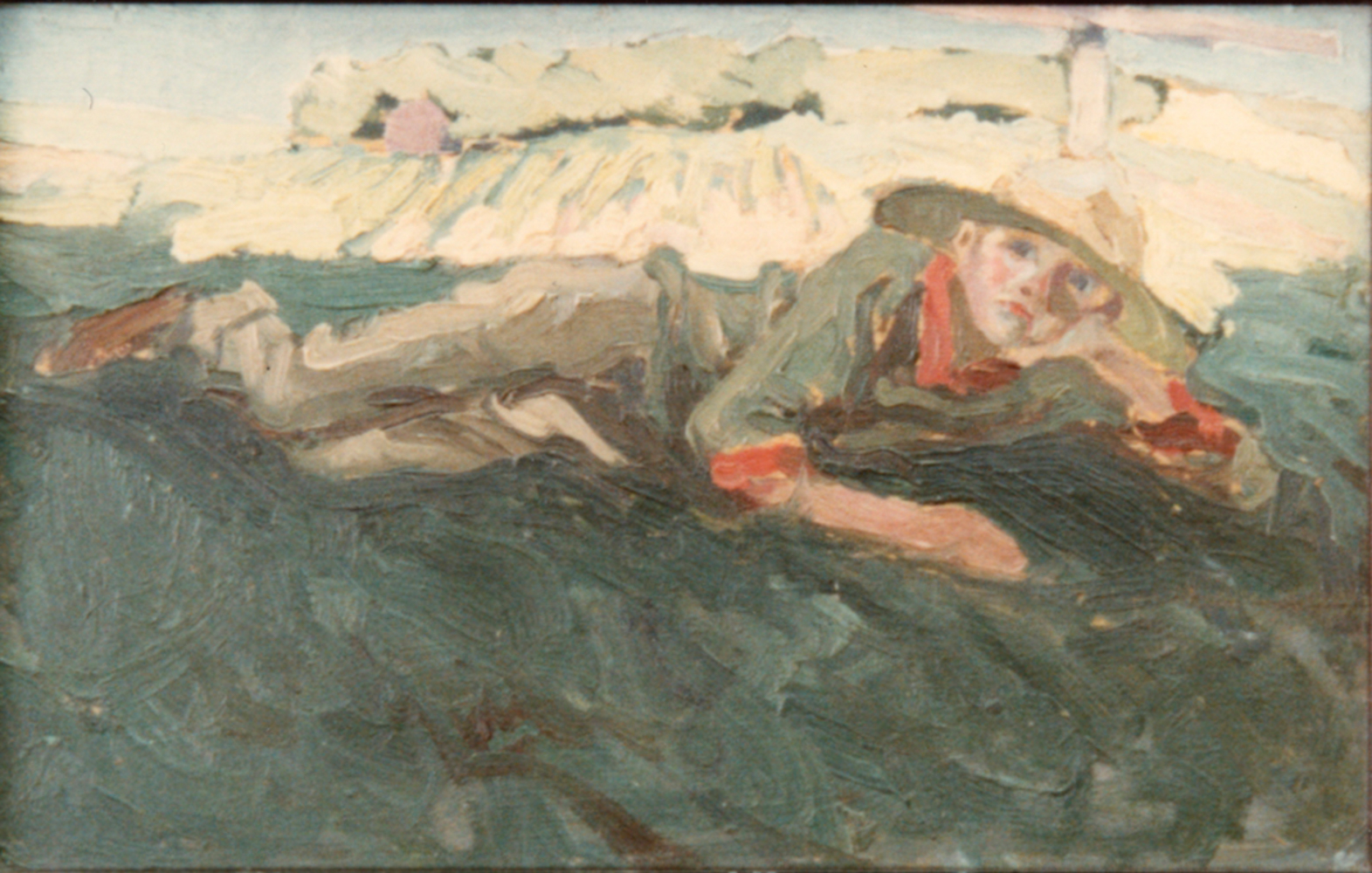
Tom Thomson, Day Dreaming, (Note: MacDonald told Toronto art collectors that this painting depicted him.) Winter 1913–15. Location unknown
