= Helga Pakasaar =

Helga Pakasaar is a contemporary art curator and writer based in Vancouver, Canada. She has worked as Audain Chief Curator at Polygon Gallery (formerly Presentation House Gallery). She has also curated exhibitions for Griffin Art Projects in North Vancouver and previously worked as a curator at the Art Gallery of Windsor and the Walter Phillips Gallery.

== Curatorial work ==
Pakasaar has produced exhibitions, commissions and publications with a focus on historical and contemporary photography and media art, such as C. 1983, Not Necessarily In That Order, Larry Clark, Stan Douglas, Lee Friedlander, Miroslav Tichy, Elizabeth Zvonar, and Kohei Yoshiyuki. Her curatorial endeavours encompass public art commissions as with Rebecca Belmore: Hacer Memoria, Samuel Roy-Bois, Moodyville, including a special issue of The Capilano Review, Territory, co-produced with Artspeak, Vancouver. Pakasaar has presented international artists, including Rosella Biscotti, Cao Fei, Keren Cytter, Jimmie Durham, Susan Hiller, Gonzalo Lebrija, Anna Oppermann, Walid Raad, Batia Suter, Wael Shawky, Simon Starling, Marianne Wex, and many westcoast artists. In 2015, Pakasaar curated the inaugural exhibition at Griffin Art Projects, showcasing art held in private collections and emphasizing the role of women collectors.

== Selected curatorial projects ==
- Jeremy Shaw: DMT, (publication) & Jack Goldstein: Under Water Sea Fantasy (publication), 2004
- Judy Radul: Downes Point and So Departed (Again), 2005 (publication)
- Territory, 2006 (publication)
- Laszlo Moholy-Nagy & Simon Starling, 2007
- Moodyville, 2008 (publication)
- Not Necessarily in that Order, 2010
- Flakey: The Early Works of Glenn Lewis, 2010
- C.1983, Part I and Part 11, 2012
- Anna Oppermann / Andrea Pinheiro / Marianne Wex, 2013
- Stan Douglas: Synthetic Pictures, 2014
- A Thousand Quarrels: Liz Magor, 2014
- Tris Vonna-Michell, 2015
- B.C. Almanac(H) C-B, 2015 (publication)
- Susan Hiller: Altered States, 2018
- Hannah Rickards: one can make out the surface only by..., 2018
- Batia Suter: Parallel Encyclopedia, 2018
- Wael Shawky: Al Araba al Madfuna, 2019
- Rebecca Belmore: hacer memoria, 2023

== Honours ==
- Alvin Balkind Curatorial Achievement Prize, 2013
