= Photography in Canada =

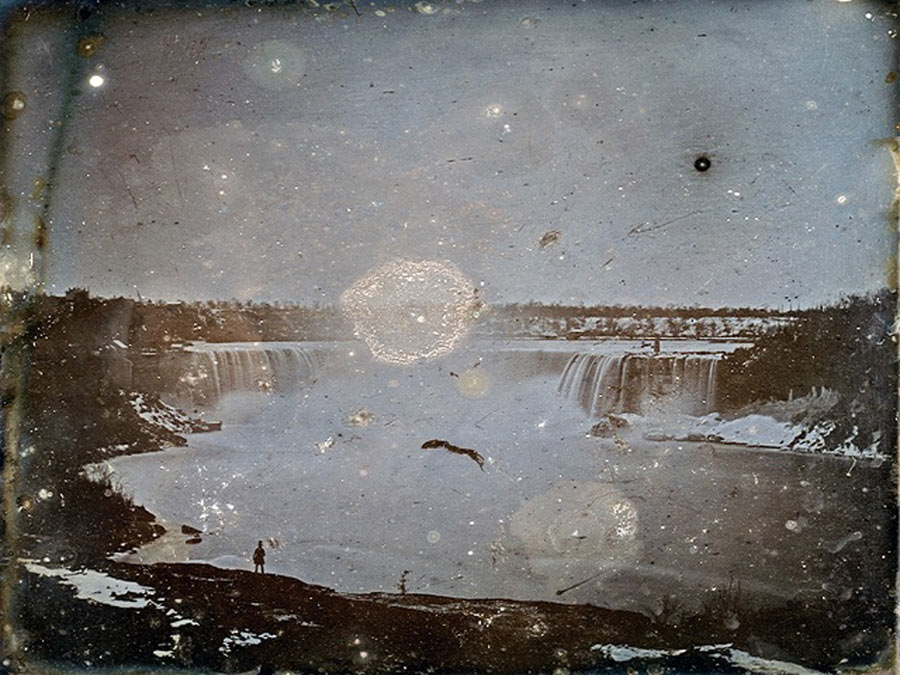
Possibly the first daguerreotype produced in Canada, Niagara Falls by Hugh Lee Pattinson, 1840

Photographs have been taken in the area now known as Canada since 1839, by both amateurs and professionals. In the 19th century, commercial photography focussed on portraiture. But professional photographers were also involved in political and anthropological projects: they were brought along on expeditions to Western Canada and were engaged to document Indigenous peoples in Canada by government agencies.

Canadian photography became more institutionalized in the 20th century. Railways including the Canadian Pacific Railway heavily used photographs in their advertising campaigns. The Still Photography Division, a department of the National Film Board of Canada, produced images for national and international distribution. Initially focussed on promoting a positive vision of the nation, by the 1960s the division transitioned to documentary photography attuned to individual photographers' artistic inclinations.

According to critic Penny Cousineau-Levine, contemporary photography in Canada de-emphasizes documenting reality; rather, it treats photographs as an invitation to consider the otherworldly.

== 19th century ==
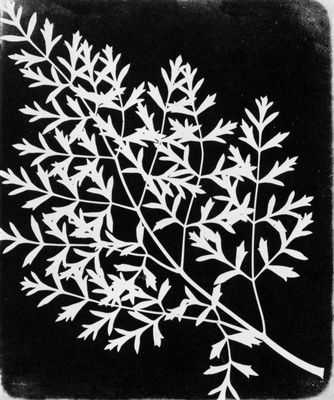
A photogenic drawing by William Henry Talbot, the first type of photograph produced in Canada, June 1839

In June 1839, the Colonial Pearl, a weekly newspaper in Halifax, Nova Scotia, reported that one of its readers had created a "photogenic drawing," probably of samples of flora such as ferns or flowers, created without a camera by placing objects on "salted" or sensitized paper. According to scholar Ralph Greenhill, this was the first such photograph produced in Canada. In 1841 Tabot would call this the calotype process.

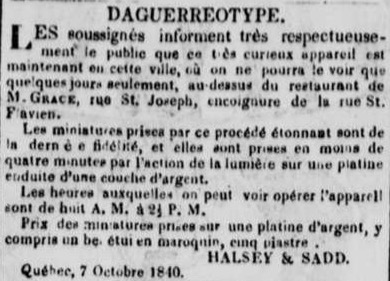
Advertisement by Halsey & Sadd for daguerreotype services, Quebec City, 9 October 1840

Canada was among the first countries to pioneer photography after the daguerreotype was released by its inventor, the Frenchman Louis Daguerre, in 1839. In late 1840, photographic "rooms" were being employed in Montreal and Quebec City, notably by two American itinerants, Halsey and Sadd. Halsey and Sadd sold their prints for $5, including "a fine Morocco case". Surviving examples of their work have been identified. A Mrs John Fletcher, from Newburyport, was probably the first woman photographer in Canada when she and her husband (who was, in addition to his photographic pursuits, a phrenologist), established themselves briefly in Montreal in 1841; her advertisements stated that she could "execute Daguerreotype Miniatures in a style unsurpassed by an American or European artist". In January, 1842 William Valentine opened a studio in his home on Marchington's Lane in Halifax, establishing the first permanent studio in Canada. A year later, Valentine and his partner, Nova Scotia-born Thomas Coffin Doane briefly took rooms at the Golden Lion Inn in St. John's, Newfoundland. Doane would later become well known for his work in his adopted city of Montreal. The earliest daguerrotypist with close associations to Quebec was the Swiss-born Pierre-Gustave Joly. In 1839, he traveled to Greece and Egypt where he took some of the world's earliest daguerreotypes. The originals were lost but the copies published as engravings have survived. Eli J. Palmer (working in Toronto) was another early "daguerrian artist" operating in this early period. The first photography-related patent in Canada went to L. A. Lemire in 1854 for a buffing process for daguerreotype plates.

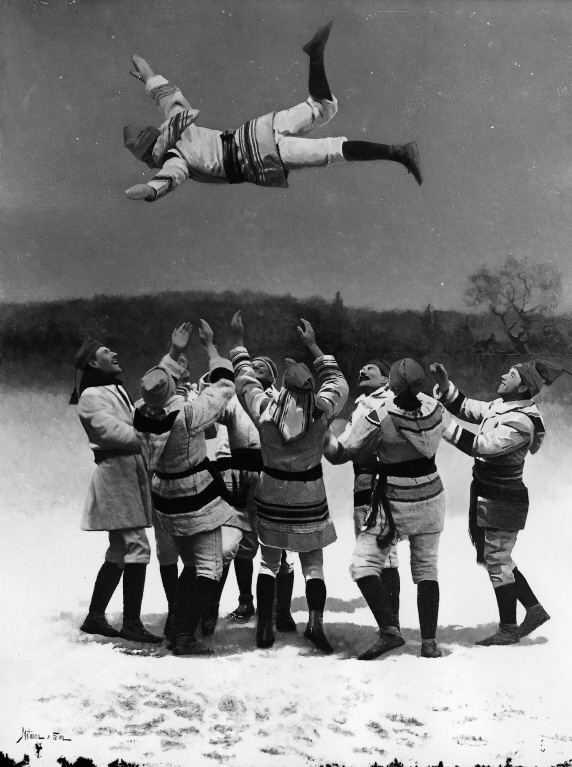
"The Bounce, Montreal Snowshoe Club" in-studio by Notman, 1886

Early Canadian landscape photographs are rare—except of Niagara Falls, which attracted photographers from the daguerreotype era onward. Portraits provided the economic basis for 19th-century commercial photography. By the late 1850s, Canadian photographers had largely abandoned the daguerreotype in favour of the ambrotype, an application of the collodion process.

Scottish-born William Notman was Canada's best known portrait photographer in the second half of the 19th century. Establishing in Montreal in the late 1850's, he was honoured as photographer to the Queen for his work during the 1860 visit of Edward, then Prince of Wales, to Canada). After Confederation he established additional studios in Ottawa and Toronto (1868), Halifax (1869) and Saint John (1872) before also venturing into the United States. By the 1870s he was producing some 14,000 negatives a year. The Notman studios are remembered for their elaborate photomontages, such as his coloured composite of the 1869 Skating Carnaval consisting of some 300 individual views, and for the indigenous scenes the studio created in its Montreal studio.

Canadian photographers such as Frederick Dally, Edward Dosseter, and Richard Maynard were commissioned by government agencies including the department of Indian affairs to conduct ethnographic portraiture of Indigenous peoples in Canada. These images were sold and disseminated globally. Photographers of settlers, including Hannah Maynard's series Gems of British Columbia, advertised the colonial frontier to prospective white newcomers.

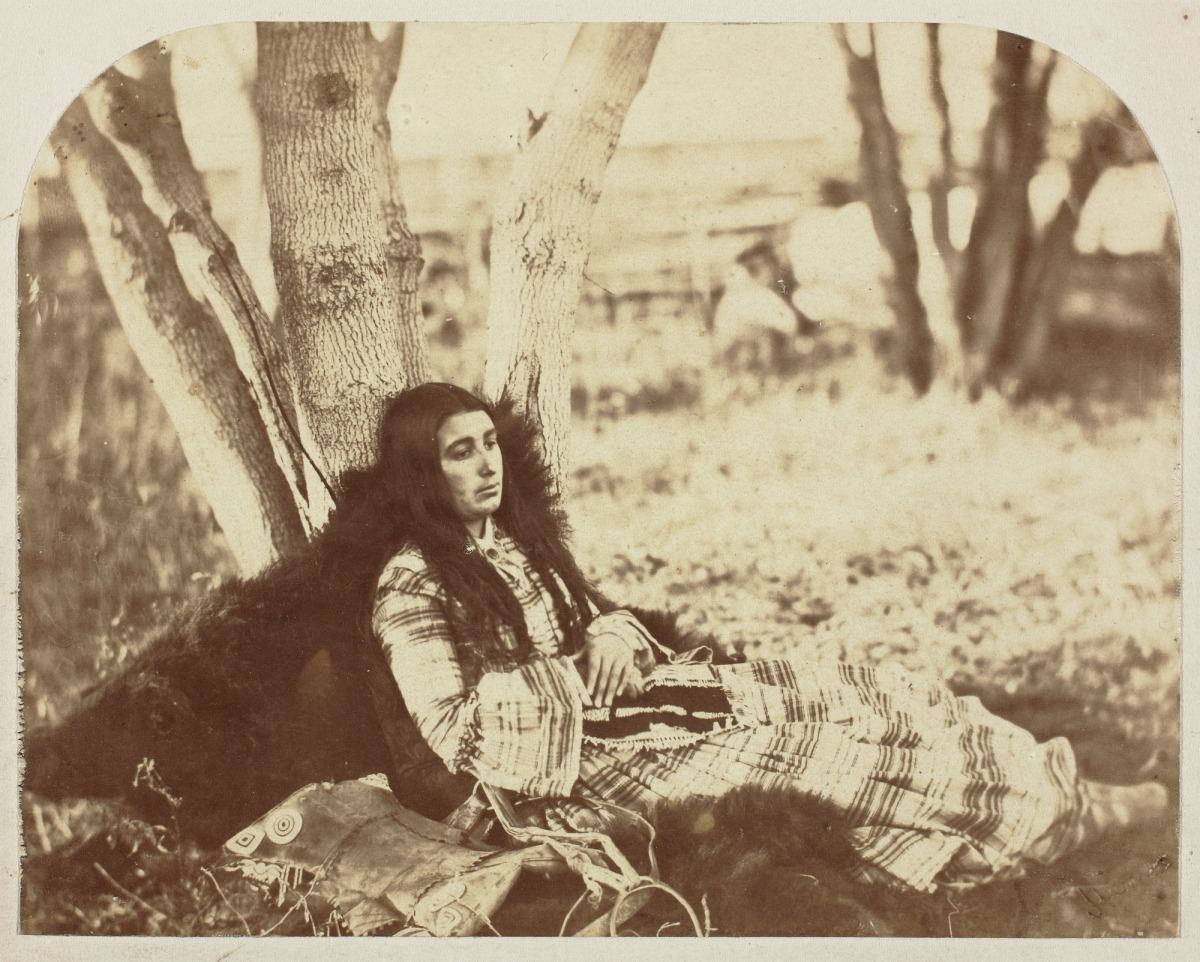
Letitia, a Plains Cree Half-Breed (1858), by Humphrey Lloyd Hime

The Photographic Portfolio: A Monthly Review of Canadian Scenes and Scenery was the first photography journal in Canada. It was published in Quebec City for two years, from 1858 to 1860, by Samuel McLaughlin (1824–1914).

The Assiniboine and Saskatchewan Exploring Expedition of 1857–1858, overseen by Henry Youle Hind, hired Humphrey Lloyd Hime as the first official photographer of a colonial expedition. (Hime was a commercial photographer with the Toronto firm Armstrong, Beere & Hime; he left photography for a career in finance around 1860.) Other colonial and anthropological expeditions in the 19th and early 20th centuries, such as the Jesup North Pacific Expedition, also produced a large volume of photographs. Likewise, the first photos of the Canadian Prairies were taken on surveying trips and other officially sponsored explorations. Several people associated with the Hudson's Bay Company documented life at trading posts in photographs.

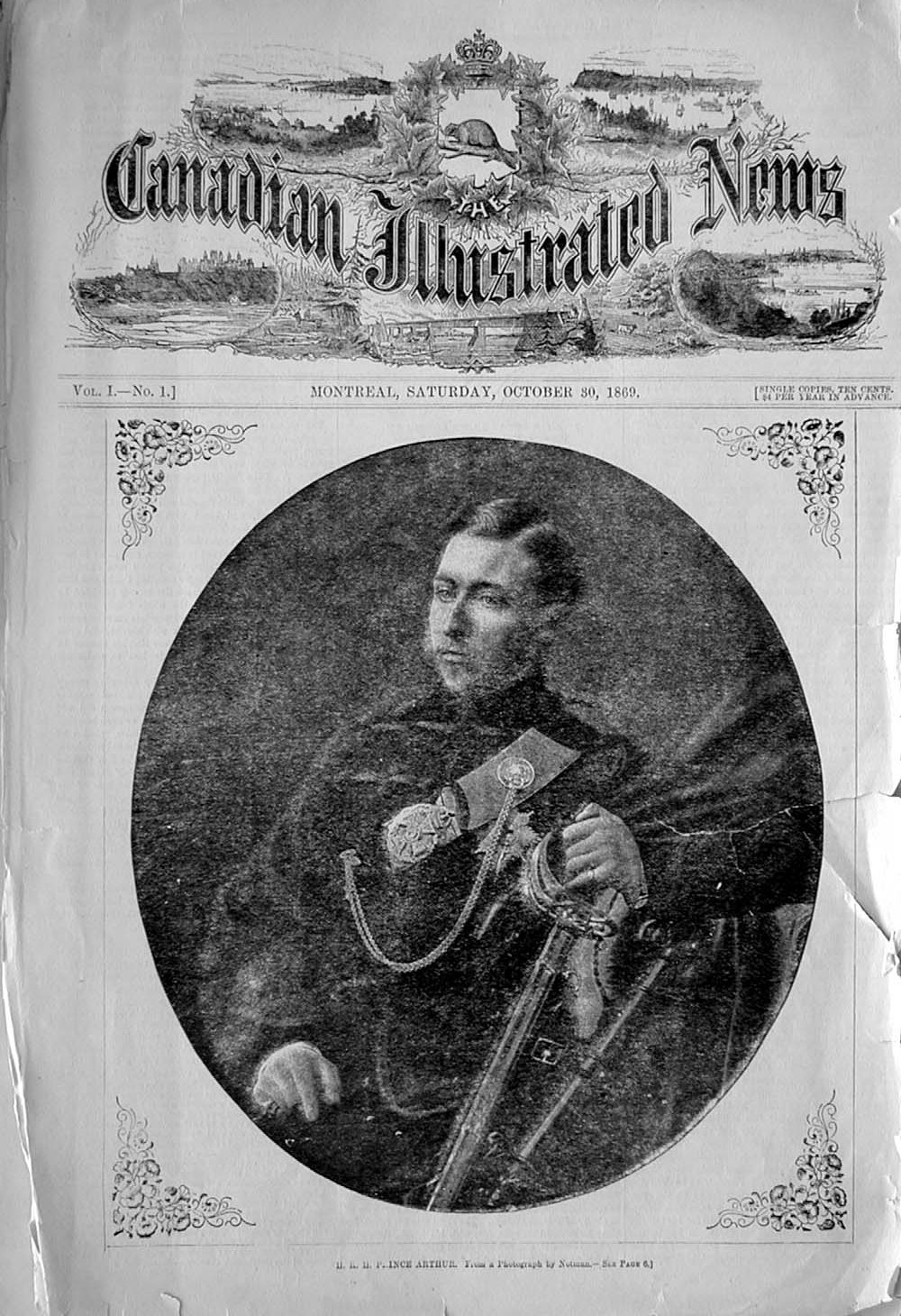
First issue of Canadian Illustrated News, October 30, 1869, employing a halftone process invented by William Leggo

The dry plate technique, which was easier than wet plate photography, became available in the 1880s. Professional photographers initially spurned the innovation, while amateurs quickly adopted it. Dry plate photography was used during the British Arctic Expedition (1875–1876).

In the late 1800s, with the advent of halftone printing, photography became more common in advertising and other media. Canadian Illustrated News, first published on 30 October 1869, made pioneering use of halftone photographic prints. This technological development coincided with a movement to develop the Prairies into "the granary of the British Empire"; images promoting settlement in Western Canada proliferated. The Canadian Pacific Railway (CPR) avidly used photographs in its offices abroad to promote immigration to Canada. The CPR and Canadian National Railway, which also maintained a photography collection, provided pictures free of charge to writers on Canada.

Photographers and studios including William Notman, Alexander Henderson, and O. B. Buell were all engaged as part of campaigns by the federal government, CPR, and others to encourage settlement. Local professional and amateur photographers in the Canadian West also documented the region during this period, often focussing on farm equipment. In 1888 the Toronto Camera Club was founded (as the Toronto Amateur Photographic Association).

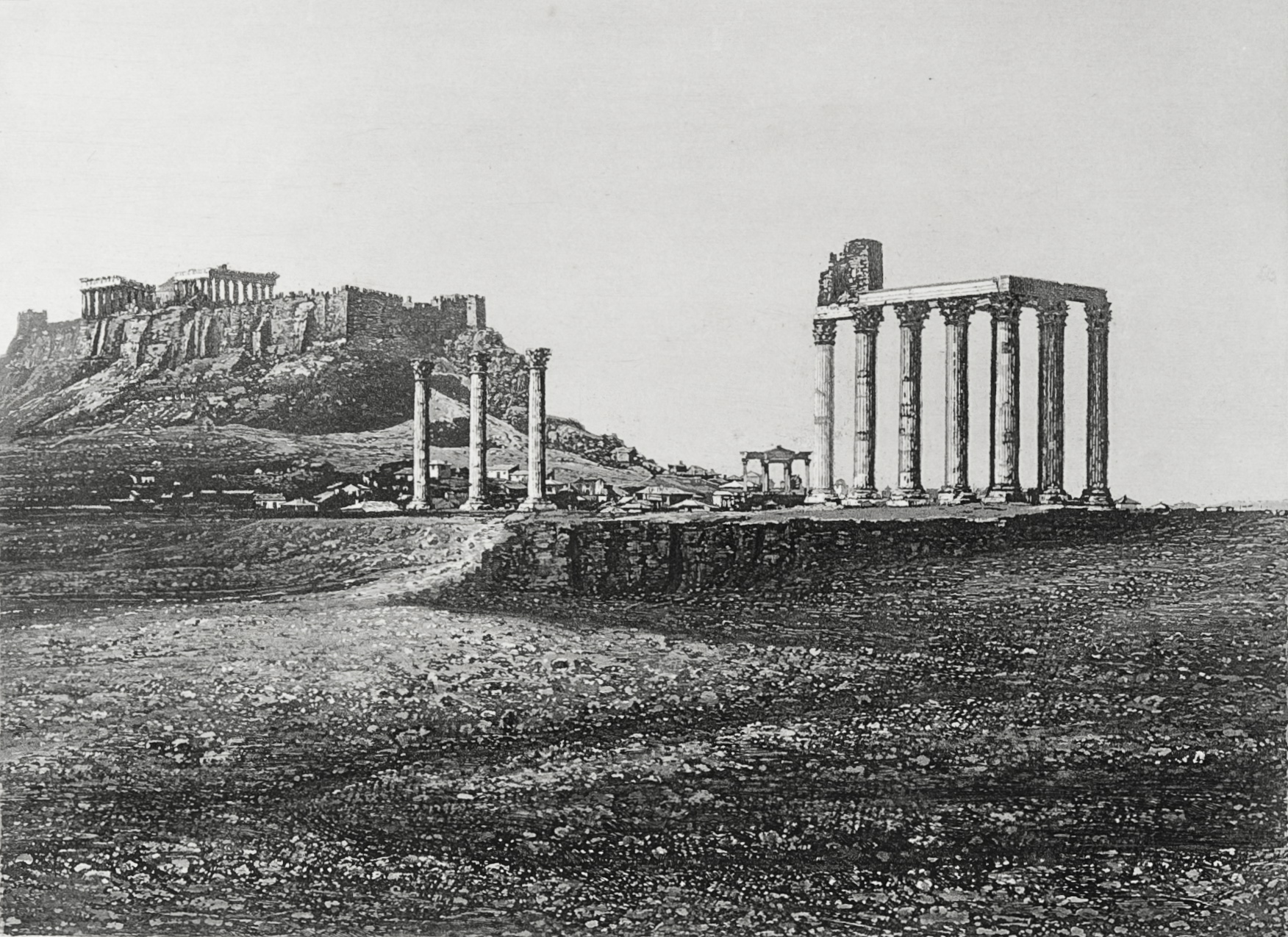
Olympian Zeus Temple and Acropolis, Athens, 1839, engraving of Pierre-Gustave Joly's daguerreotype

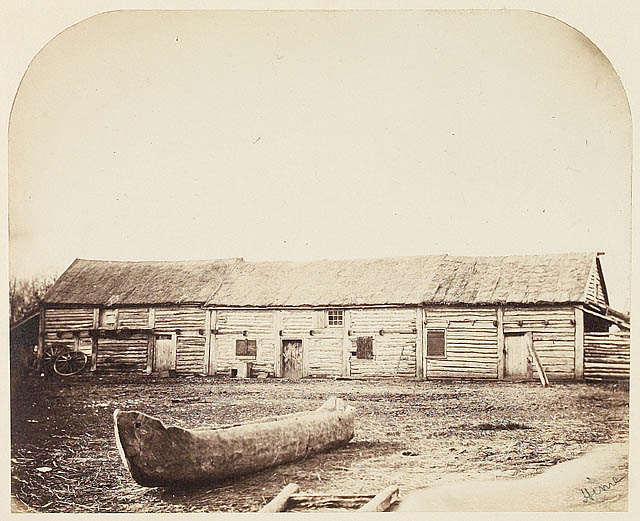
Lloyd Hime's photograph of McDermot's store, Fort Garry, Manitoba, 1858

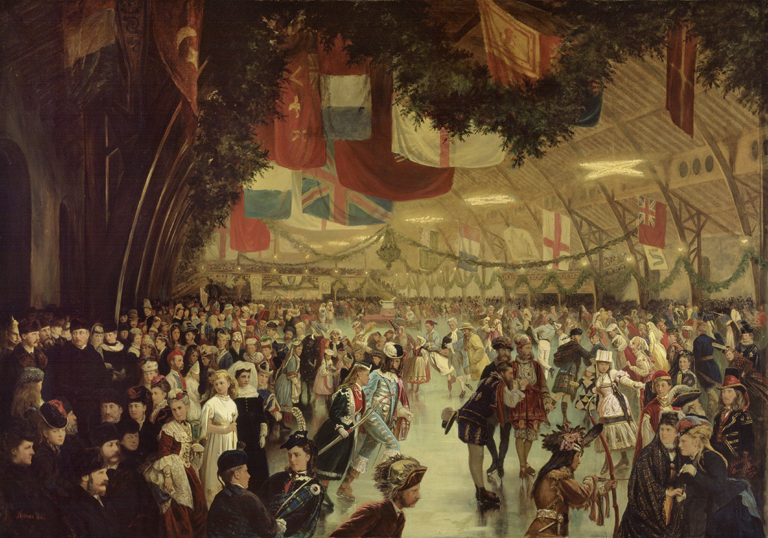
Notman's Montreal Skating Carnaval, colored composite 1870

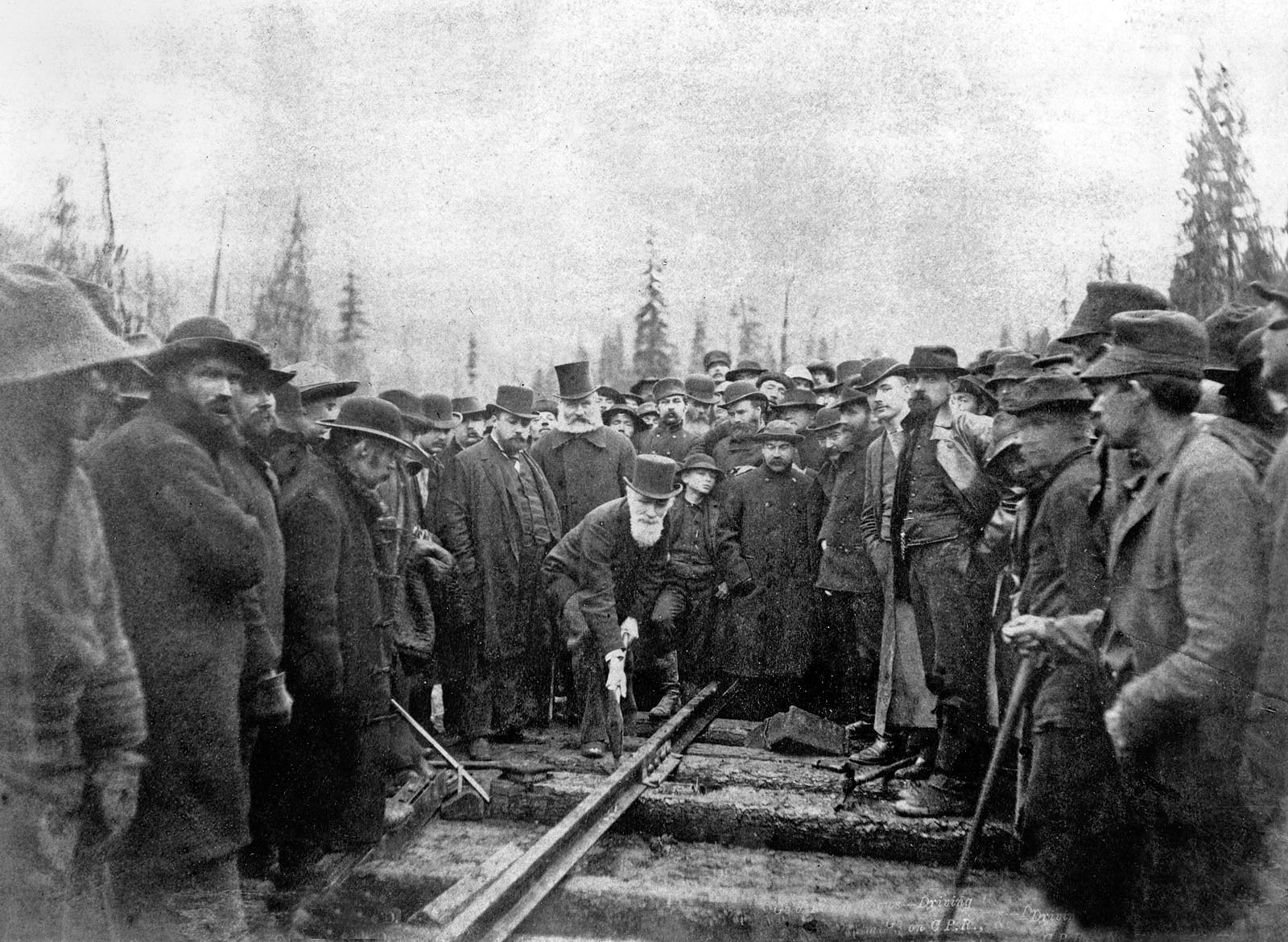
Last Spike at Craigellachie, British Columbia, 1885

== 20th century ==
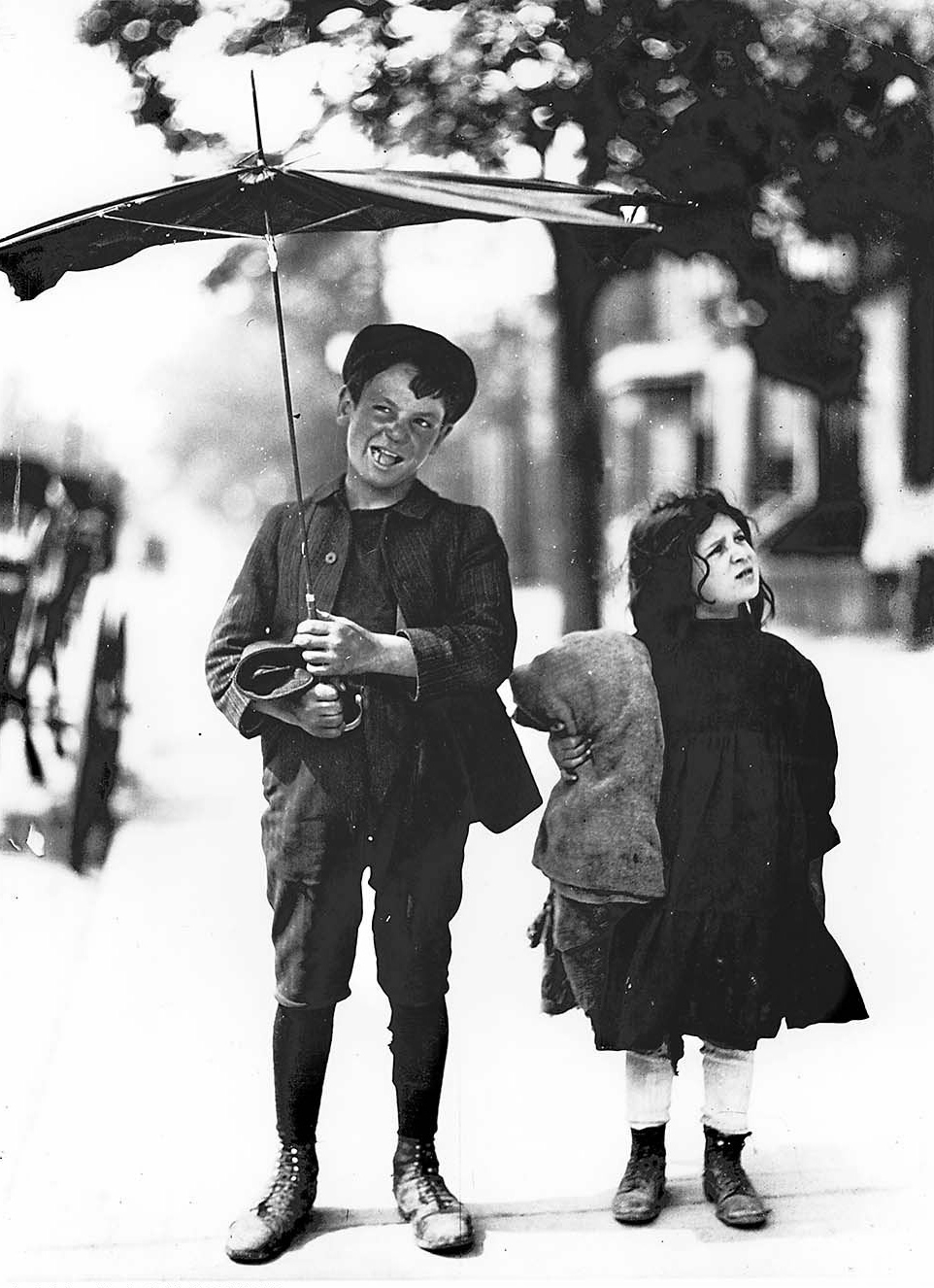
Picture of children in the Ward by William James (1908)

Concerns about the absence of a specific Canadian mode of photography were aired in the early 20th century, both by Canadians including Harold Mortimer-Lamb, who lamented that the Canadian natural world was not sufficiently represented, and at least one British critic who remarked that there was no evidence of a "Canadian spirit" in then-contemporary photographic output.

Around the turn of the 20th century, developments in printing technology made it possible for Canadian amateurs and professionals to produce their own photographic postcards. In 1913, 60 million postcards were sent in Canada.

In Toronto around the turn of the 20th century, newspapers and other periodicals documented the Ward, a poor and largely immigrant neighbourhood, in photographs. Copious halftone prints in papers including The Toronto World and The Globe, many by William James, illustrated articles designed to shock, entertain, and attract readers with the lives of Ward residents.

The CPR, as part of an advertising campaign in the 1920s and 1930s, commissioned photographers including John Vanderpant, whom scholar Jill Delaney described as the "leading pictorialist photographer in Canada", to document Western Canada, particularly the Rockies. The campaign aimed to associate Canada as a nation with its natural environment—and both with the CPR. The CPR had used photography to memorialize and promote its operations at least since 1885, when the last spike was driven in; Alexander Ross of Calgary took the iconic photograph, which was widely distributed.

Beginning in the 1940s, the Canadian federal government had a photography department. On 8 August 1941, the Still Photography Division, sometimes simply called Photo Services, was transferred to the National Film Board of Canada pursuant to an order in council. The division employed photographers, photo editors, and others to create photographs in service of "national unity". During the Second World War, the division focussed on documenting the home front. Staff also produced photographs for other federal agencies and provided content for publications not affiliated with the government. Scholar Carol Payne argues that a major role of the division during the war was to produce propaganda.

After the war, the Still Photography Division's budget was cut substantially, even as the National Film Board tried to maintain its status as the federal government's only official photography agency. It continued to promote a vision of Canadian nationhood in peacetime through the 1950s. One distinctive channel for the division's efforts was the photo story, often distributed as a newspaper supplement. Photo stories were uncritically positive; Payne calls them "jingoistic". When Lorraine Monk took over as head of the Still Photography Division in 1960, she turned the division away from the photo story model in favour of documentary photography more attuned to the sensibilities of individual photographers. This was part of a broader turn towards modernism in Canadian thinking about photography: it was viewed as an art form, not solely as a means of reporting on reality. The division's final photo story was published in April 1971. Later that year, the division ceased to be the federal government's sole photography agency when, as part of a broader redistribution of responsibilities and personnel, some of the division's photographers were sent to Information Canada (another federal department).

As of the early 1940s, Yousuf Karsh was "one of Canada's pre-eminent portrait photographers".

The Commercial and Press Photographers Association of Canada, which changed its name to Professional Photographers of Canada (PPC) in 1962, was founded in 1946. A professional association for photojournalists, PPC aimed to create "a strong national identity for all those involved in the photographic industry".

Critic Serge Jongué argues that photography in Quebec had shifted from a documentary focus during the 1970s to an emphasis on experimentalism as of the early 1990s. He links this development to rapid cultural changes in the province during the latter half of the 20th century, including the Quiet Revolution. He identifies Gabor Szilasi and Pierre Gaudard as two key figures in Quebec photography of the late 20th century.

== Contemporary ==
Penny Cousineau-Levine suggests that death is a predominant theme in contemporary Canadian photography. She argues, against theories of photography defended by Susan Sontag in On Photography and Roland Barthes in Camera Lucida, that Canadian photographers use a medium uniquely capable of mimesis so as to distance themselves from the real: "[t]he sine qua non of photography, its unique capacity for verisimilitude, is the very trait that many Canadian photographers seem distinctly ill at ease with." According to Cousineau-Levine, Canadian street photography is more often about otherworldly matters than a comment on the worldly events it nominally depicts. She identifies a set of portraits taken by Karen Smiley in 1976, and the work of Anne-Marie Zeppetelli, as exemplars of Canadian photographers' use of this realist medium to explore themes beyond the everyday.

Comparing Canadian portraits of working people by Cal Bailey with their American counterparts by Irving Penn and Richard Avedon, Cousineau-Levine suggests that the Canadian portraits show their subjects as "uprooted" from their surroundings—by contrast with the American portraits, which, according to Cousineau-Levine, do not depict people ill at ease in the frame. This tendency to dislocate the photographic subject from its background persists, says Cousineau-Levine, in Canadian architecture photography by artists including Orest Semchishen.

== See also ==
- List of Canadian women photographers
- List of Canadian photojournalists

== Sources ==
- 13 Essays on Photography. Canadian Museum of Contemporary Photography. 1992. ISBN 9780888845573. OCLC 1145816193.
- Cousineau-Levine, Penny (2003). Faking Death: Canadian Art Photography and the Canadian Imagination. McGill–Queen's University Press. ISBN 978-0-7735-7095-5. OCLC 180704373.
- Greenhill, Ralph (1965). Early Photography in Canada. Oxford University Press. OCLC 299937776.
- Hatfield, Philip J. (18 June 2018). Canada in the Frame: Copyright, Collections and the Image of Canada, 1895–1924. UCL Press. doi:10.2307/j.ctv3hvc7m. ISBN 978-1-78735-299-5. JSTOR j.ctv3hvc7m. OCLC 1045427072.
- Kunard, Andrea; Payne, Carol, eds. (2011). The Cultural Work of Photography in Canada. McGill–Queen's University Press. ISBN 978-0-7735-8572-0. OCLC 806255104.
- Palmquist, Peter E.; Kailbourn, Thomas R. (2005). Pioneer Photographers from the Mississippi to the Continental Divide: A Biographical Dictionary, 1839–1865. Stanford University Press. ISBN 978-0-8047-4057-9.
- Payne, Carol (2013). The Official Picture: The National Film Board of Canada's Still Photography Division and the Image of Canada, 1941–1971. McGill–Queen's University Press. ISBN 978-0-7735-8894-3. OCLC 1037916154.
