= Hanky Panky =

Hanky Panky may refer to:

== Music ==
- Hanky Panky (Hank Jones album), 1975
- Hanky Panky (The The album), 1995
- Hanky Panky (Tommy James and the Shondells album), 1966
- "Hanky Panky" (Tommy James and the Shondells song), 1966 (originally recorded by The Raindrops in 1963)
- "Hanky Panky" (Madonna song), 1990
- "Hanky Panky", an instrumental by Dexter Gordon from Clubhouse, 1965
- "Hanky Panky", a song by Tracey Dey, 1965

== Film and television ==
- Hanky Panky (1979 film) or Gol Maal, an Indian Hindi-language comedy directed by Hrishikesh Mukherjee
- Hanky Panky (1982 film), an American comedy thriller directed by Sidney Poitier
- Hanky Panky (2017 film), a Taiwanese comedy directed by Huang Chao-liang
- Hanky Panky (2023 film), an American comedy horror film
- "Hanky Panky" (King of the Hill), a television episode

== Other uses ==
- Hanky panky (cocktail), a variation on the sweet martini
- Henk Schiffmacher or Hanky Panky (born 1952), Dutch tattoo artist
- Hanky Panky (painting), a 2020 painting by Kent Monkman

== See also ==
- Hokkani boro or hakk'ni panki, a Romany expression meaning "great trick"
