= Albert Gilbert =

Canadian photographer (1922–2019)

Albert "Al" Gilbert
- Born: November 18, 1922; Toronto, Ontario, Canada
- Died: January 22, 2019 (aged 96); Toronto, Ontario, Canada
- Known for: Photographer
- Awards: Order of Canada

Albert "Al" Gilbert CM (November 18, 1922 – January 22, 2019) was a Canadian photographer. He was often called the "Ambassador of Canadian Photography".

He was born in Toronto, Ontario into a family of Ukrainian-Jewish origin. He began working with his father, Nathan Gittelmacher, who was also a photographer. He photographed all Prime Ministers of Israel who served between 1950 and his death.

He was awarded the Photographer of the Year Award from the Professional Photographers of Canada in 1968, 1969, and 1973. He is a Fellow of the Professional Photographers of Canada, a Fellow of the Royal Photographic Society of Great Britain and a Fellow of the American Society of Photographers.

In 1989, he was made a Member of the Order of Canada in recognition for being "a master portrait photographer".

His son, Michael Gilbert, is also a photographer.

As well as his Grandson Darren Gilbert Levant. Apprentice 1988-2016

Gilbert died in January 2019 at the age of 96.
