= W. Frank Lynn =

Canadian artist (d.1906)

- Born: Washington Frank Lynn c. 1836; London, England
- Died: 20 July 1906 (aged 69–70); Winnipeg, Manitoba, Canada
- Education: Royal Academy of Art
- Known for: artist, journalist, writer
- Spouse: Elizabeth Charlotte Tarren (m. 1874)

W. Frank Lynn (died 1906) was a Canadian artist, journalist and writer, known for his paintings of early Winnipeg. He was the first professional artist to be a resident of Winnipeg.

== Career ==
Lynn was born in London, England and after study at the Royal Academy of Art (1860–1861), came to North America in 1861, working as a newspaper reporter for The Globe in Toronto. He wrote articles on the American Civil War (1861–1864).

He returned to England in 1864 and worked for the Canadian Land and Emigration Company, and brought families to Canada. From his experience he wrote a useful book, Farming in Canada and Canada: pamphlets for working men. In 1868, he helped found the Royal Colonial Institute of London, which may have interested him in the Canadian northwest. In 1872, he returned to Canada and explored Manitoba and the northwest. He continued to write letters for the Globe. He also did a series of paintings about early Winnipeg (1872–1877) and the area and later did versions of them, besides receiving commissions. His painting The Dakota Boat (c. 1875) (Winnipeg Art Gallery) in which he pictured the steamboat Dakota is considered iconic. Contemporary artists such as Kent Monkman use it as source material for their work.

Lynn left Winnipeg and travelled to Minnesota, then back to England, and returned to Winnipeg in 1885 as an owner of a grocery and notions shop run by his wife. He ran for public office as an alderman, but was unsuccessful, but he continued to write letters to the press. He died in Winnipeg in 1906.

== Selected public collections ==
- Manitoba Archives & Special Collections
- Glenbow Museum (Calgary)
- Winnipeg Art Gallery
