= Kent Monkman =

Cree First Nations painter from Ontario, Canada (born 1965)

Kent Monkman OC
- Born: 13 November 1965 (age 61); St. Mary's, Ontario, Canada
- Citizenship: Fisher River Cree Nation
- Known for: performance artist, painter
- Style: socio-political art
- Awards: Officer of the Order of Canada (2023); Indspire Award (2014); Premier's Award for Excellence in the Arts (2017)
- Website: www.kentmonkman.com

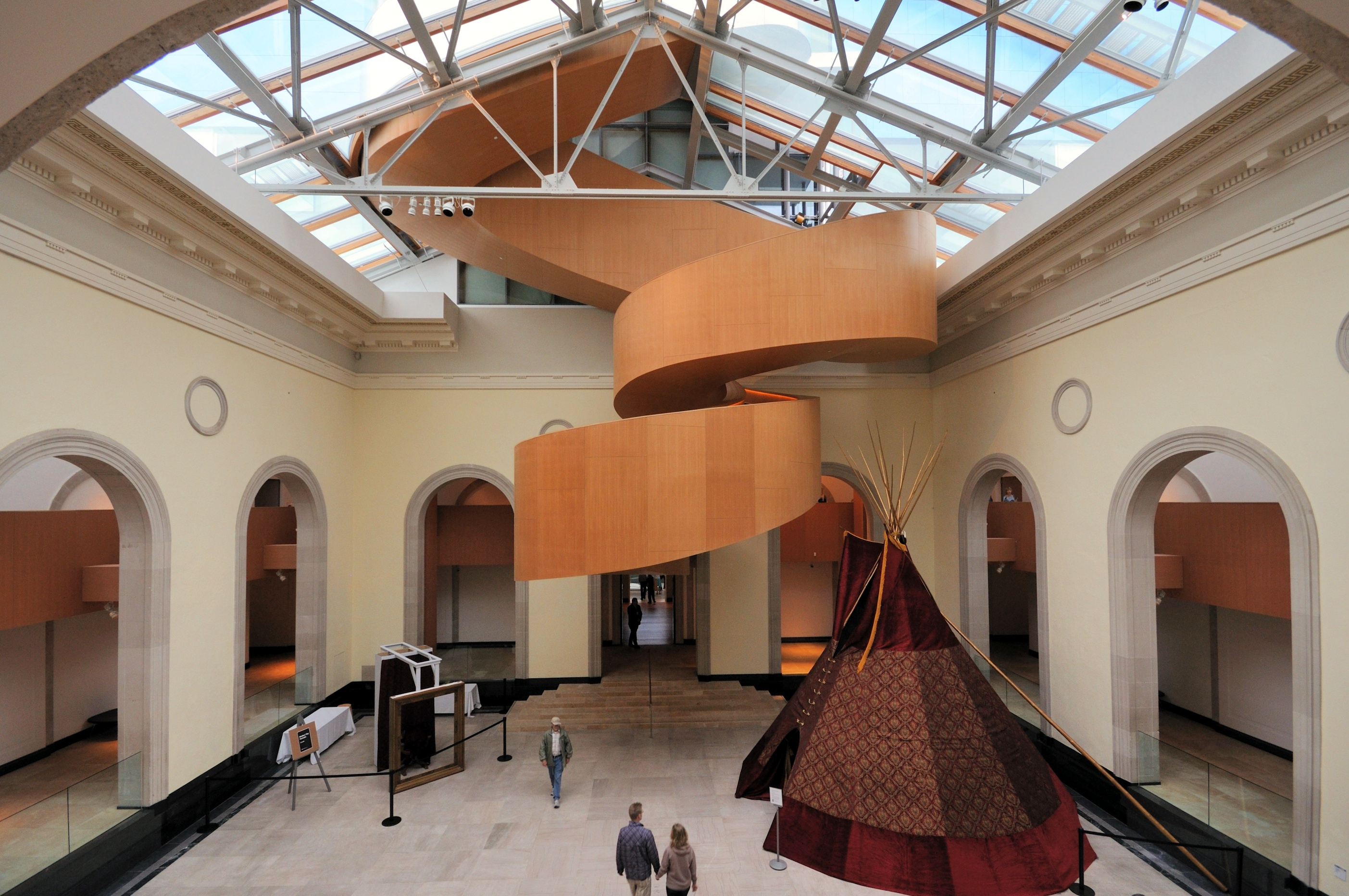
Kent Monkman, Salon Indien, 2006, installation with silent film theatre, part of Remix: New Modernities in a Post-Indian World, Art Gallery of Ontario, 2009.

Kent Monkman OC (born 13 November 1965) is a Cree First Nations painter. He is a citizen of the Fisher River Cree Nation in Manitoba's Interlake Region. Monkman lives and works between Toronto and New York City.

He works in painting, film/video art, performance art, and installation art. In the early 2000s, Monkman developed his two-spirit alter ego, Miss Chief Eagle Testickle. He has had many solo exhibitions at museums and galleries in Canada, the United States, and Europe. He has achieved international recognition for colourful and detailed works that combine genre conventions and recast historical narratives.

== Biography ==
Monkman was born in St. Marys, Ontario, and raised in Winnipeg, Manitoba. He attended various Canadian and U.S. institutions, including the Banff Centre for Arts and Creativity, the Sundance Institute in Los Angeles, and the National Screen Institute. He graduated with a degree in Canadian art from Sheridan College in 1986.

Monkman created sets and costumes for several Native Earth Performing Arts productions, including Lady of Silences (1993) by Floyd Favel and Diva Ojibway (1994) by Tina Mason.

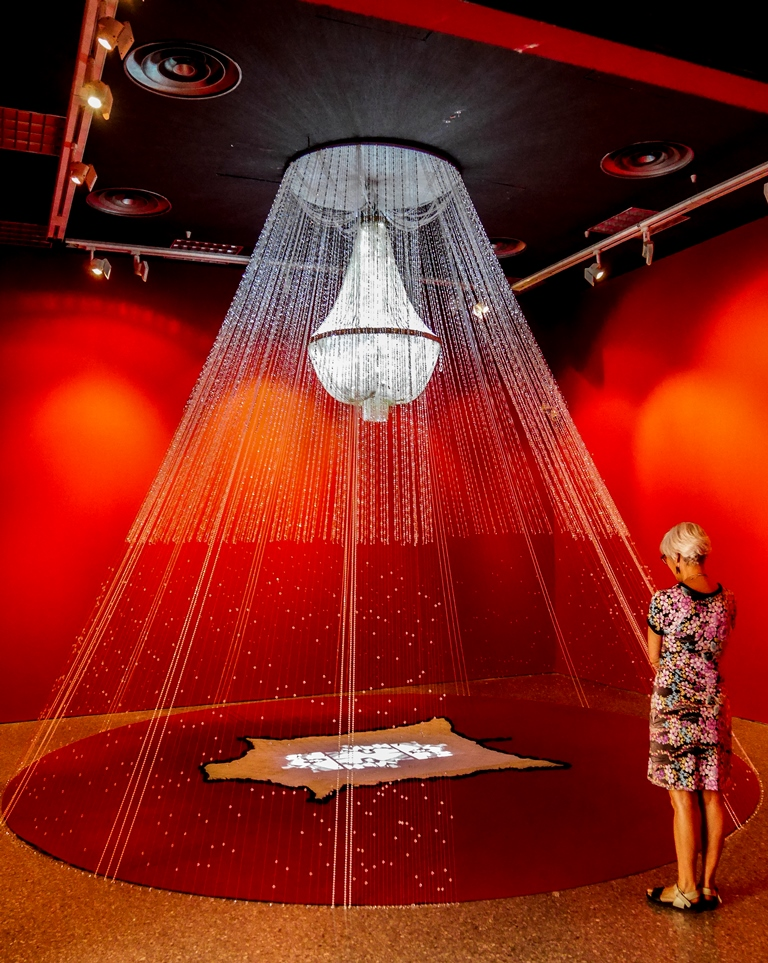
Théâtre de cristal. Valencian Museum of Ethnology, temporary exhibition "Beyond Hollywood: American Indian identities"

In 2017, Monkman received the Bonham Centre Award from the Mark S. Bonham Centre for Sexual Diversity Studies at the University of Toronto. He also accepted the honorary title of grand marshal for Pride Toronto that year, citing the importance of recognition for Indigenous people during the 150th anniversary of Canada celebrations.

Barbara Fischer, curator of the Art Museum at the University of Toronto, commissioned Monkman's exhibit, "Shame and Prejudice: A Story of Resilience" to "set up a provocative friction between Canadian national myths, aboriginal experience and traditional European art practices." The exhibit sought to look at what Canada's 150 years meant for Indigenous peoples.

In 2019, the Metropolitan Museum of Art commissioned two paintings from Monkman for its Great Hall, entitled mistikôsiwak (Wooden Boat People). In 2020, the Met acquired the diptych of paintings entitled Welcoming the Newcomers (2019) and Resurgence of the People (2019), as well as publishing Revision and Resistance: mistikôsiwak (Wooden Boat People) (2020).

Monkman has identified both himself and Miss Chief as two-spirit.

== Art practice ==
According to Michael Bick, Monkman's work "convey[s] a deep understanding of oppression and the mechanisms at work in dominant ideology." Through his use of mimicry, Monkman subverts and de-centers the Western gaze; playing with role reversal, he makes colonial audiences aware that "you've been looking at us [but] we've also been looking at you." He appropriates classical 19th-century landscapes, speaking to the appropriation and assimilation of Indigenous culture by colonial settlers. Some of the binaries he tackles are "artist and model, colonial explorer and colonized subject, gazer and gazed upon, male and female, straight and queer, past and present, real and imaginary."

=== Use of colonizers' images ===
Monkman's 2006 Trappers of Men painting takes an 1868 landscape painting by Albert Bierstadt, but portrays the scene at midday, replacing animals with perplexed white people from American art and political history, a Lakota historian, and Monkman's two-spirit alter ego Miss Chief Eagle Testickle.

Monkman "us[es] the Master's language, but his speech subverts rather than upholds the paradigm of oppression." He creates ironic, often humorous representations of attitudes towards First Nations culture.

He has been criticized for using mimicry, but it has also been argued that he is "chang[ing] the signification of the language of oppression, [as] even the minority artist must appeal to a mainstream audience." Monkman attempts to get non-Indigenous Canadians to see the history of colonization and its representations under a new light.

=== Style and method ===
Monkman adopts the Old Master style of painting to express emotions. He has been inspired particularly by Antonio Gisbert's Execution of Torrijos and his Companions on the Beach at Málaga (1888). On a project beginning in 2017, Monkman and his team began working on a series based on the Standing Rock protests where they combined photographs from the protest with classic battle scene paintings. Models posed in the style of classic paintings, and then the photographs were projected on large canvas, traced, and base-painted by assistants before Monkman did his finishing touches. He derived Miss Chief's Wet Dream (2018) from two French paintings, The Raft of the Medusa (1818–1819) by Théodore Géricault and Christ Asleep during the Tempest (1854) by Eugène Delacroix, to evoke Canada's relationship between Indigenous peoples and colonizers. Between 2012 and 2016, Monkman created the four-part series The Four Continents (Miss America, Miss Africa, Miss Asia, and Miss Europe) as a critical response to Giambattista Tiepolo’s ceiling frescoes in the Würzburg Residence.

=== Controversy ===
Monkman's painting Hanky Panky depicts the former Prime Minister of Canada, Justin Trudeau, restrained and on all fours with his pants down as Monkman's alter ego, Miss Chief Eagle Testickle, approaches him from behind holding up a red sex toy in the shape of praying hands. Monkman initially suggested that the scene was a consensual act, but later apologized for "any harm that was caused by the work." Indigenous critics disparaged Monkman's portrayal of sexual violence, especially his portrayal of Indigenous women participating in voyeuristic rape.

Some critics say that Monkman prioritizes the white colonial perspective and sometimes "falls in with a tradition of artists voicing the perspective of Indigenous groups that do not wholly belong to them."

== Miss Chief Eagle Testickle ==
Miss Chief Eagle Testickle is the two-spirit alter ego that Monkman uses in his art; she is a hunter, artist, activist, seducer, hero, and performer. She is also a mythological and anachronistic time traveler, existing during the creation of the world itself as well as in the “colonial spaces [of] the past and present.”

The "Miss Chief" part of her name is a play on the word "mischief", to reflect Miss Chief's trickster role in many of Monkman's works. "Eagle Testickle" sounds like "egotistical", to allude to "what Monkman sees as the egotism of 19th century [Euro-North American] artists." As Penny Cousineau-Levine claims, by originally identifying with Cher, "Miss Chief foregrounds her 'half-breed' identity." Dayna Mcleod explains: "Miss Chief's name speaks to (mis)representations of Indigeneity, gender, and sexuality and disrupts all three."

Monkman was interested in colonial artists who documented "highly idealized representations of Canadian Aboriginal peoples as noble savages." These depictions "sought to 'freeze' [Indigenous peoples] in these idealized, yet lost times" or "depict 'pristine landscapes of Canada' that were 'void of reference to native peoples'." Monkman was interested in the "subjective position of the artists who produce Western American wild frontier paintings". Jonathan Katz argues that Monkman is concerned with the "telling of the past, as opposed to the past itself."

Monkman claims that his inspiration for creating Miss Chief was George Catlin's painting Dance to the Berdash (1835–1837). In response to both the painting and Catlin's remarks about traditional Indigenous conceptions of gender and sexuality, Monkman was "prompted to incorporate a persona in his paintings that would embrace gender and sexuality, honouring the tradition of the two-spirit in Indigenous societies" and "create an artistic persona that could rival that of Catlin." Monkman has stated that Miss Chief helps him "lighten how [he] treats sometimes very dark subject matter."

=== Portrait of the Artist as Hunter ===
In Portrait of The Artist as Hunter (2002), an acrylic painting depicts Miss Chief hunting while riding bare-back on a white stallion against a background of the Great Plains. Monkman appropriates John Mix Stanley’s painting Buffalo Hunt (1845), which uses "the image of the [Indigenous] male and presents him as a mysterious, exotic figure; the subject of romanticized notions of the Noble Savage," while the cowboy's exposed bottom is "a sign that he is to be dominated by his pursuant" and of "his desirability and vulnerability to sexual contact."

=== Two-spiritedness and queerness ===
Miss Chief possesses an idealized masculine body to challenge 19th century depictions of two-spirit people as submissive and inferior. This character also serves as the vehicle for his Four Continents series, combining a queer perspective with a critique of colonial history. Furthermore, Miss Chief's two-spirit identity "is an assertion that... the values of settler communities have not entirely succeeded in suppressing the sexual and gender mores of [Indigenous] communities." By combining this masculinity with contemporary drag makeup and queerness, Miss Chief subverts contemporary constructions of masculinity and Indigeneity that are based on dominant historical narratives.

Monkman aims to indigenize history through fluidity of gender. Miss Chief shows that "the contemporary view [of Indigeneity and two-spiritedness] is incomprehensible without the past... we ourselves are still inhabited by these historical ideas and images."

=== Iconography and fashion ===
Reilley Bishop-Stall suggests that Miss Chief's conflation of the customs and traditional wear of distinct Indigenous nations with settler clothing fetishizes depictions of Indigeneity in historical Western art and contemporary pop culture.

Miss Chief as a character is "constantly traveling back and forth from Europe and always [comes] back with the latest fashions," for which some have called her inauthentic. As Alla Myzelev explains, Miss Chief "blurs the accepted boundaries between... authentic and inauthentic cultural formations."

=== Miss Chief as trickster ===
Miss Chief is "a trickster." She is able to travel between oppositions that "structure life in North America" by undermining polarities between "the past and present, [the] resistant and the complicit... [the] authentic and the degraded."

Despite the violence and brutality of her actions in many of Monkman's works, the irony of the depicted scenes is often humorous. As literary critic Eva Gruber explains, many Indigenous artists and authors ironically "engage with the representational tropes [of Indigeneity], very nearly reproducing them in order to subvert and expose them as false constructions." Shirley Madill argues that Miss Chief's ability to "reverse the gaze of colonizers" tricks audiences into engaging with how all historical narratives are constructed.

=== Group of Seven Inches ===
While Monkman was artist-in-residence at the McMichael Gallery in Vaughan, the gallery looped Edward S. Curtis' film In the Land of the Head Hunters (1914) in an area focused on Indigenous history, despite its problematic framing. In 2005, after seeing this, Monkman performed The Taxonomy of The European Male. The content shot of that session was edited into the film Group of Seven Inches.

=== The Memoirs of Miss Chief Eagle Testickle ===
In 2023, Monkman and Gisèle Gordon published The Memoirs of Miss Chief Eagle Testickle, a two-volume fictionalized memoir of Miss Chief Eagle Testickle following her through history.

The first volume was shortlisted for the Governor General's Award for English-language fiction at the 2024 Governor General's Awards.

== Select exhibitions ==
- Polarities, Monte Clark Gallery, Vancouver, 1993
- The Prayer Language, Indian and Inuit Art Gallery, Hull, Quebec, October 11 – November 22, 2001
- Shame and Prejudice: A Story of Resilience, Art Museum at the University of Toronto, January 26 – March 5, 2017
- Kent Monkman: Being Legendary, Royal Ontario Museum, Toronto, October 8, 2022 – April 16, 2023
- Kent Monkman: History is Painted by the Victors, Denver Art Museum, Denver, April 20, 2025 – August 17, 2025; Montreal Museum of Fine Arts, September 27, 2025 – March 8, 2026

== Awards ==
- Indspire Award (2014)
- Premier's Awards for Excellence in the Arts (2017)
- Officer of Order of Canada (2023)

== See also ==
- Indigenous drag performers
