= Sandra Semchuk =

Canadian photographic artist

Sandra Semchuck
- Born: 1948 (age 77–78); Meadow Lake, Saskatchewan, Canada
- Education: Bachelor of Fine Arts, University of Saskatchewan, Saskatchewan, 1970 Masters Degree in Photography, University of New Mexico, 1983
- Known for: Photographer
- Spouse: James Nicholas (d. 2007)
- Awards: Governor General's Award in Visual and Media Arts (2018)

Sandra Semchuk (born 1948) is a Canadian photographic artist. In addition to exhibiting across Canada and internationally, Semchuk taught at Emily Carr University of Art and Design from 1987 to 2018.

In 1998, Presentation House, Vancouver, British Columbia, programmed "How Far Back is Home ..." a 25-year retrospective of Semchuk's career highlighting her relationship to identity, morality and land.

Sandra was awarded a grant from 2008 to 2015 from the Canada First World War Internment Fund to complete her book on Ukrainians in Canada, The Stories Were Not Told: Stories and Photographs from Canada's First Internment Camps, 1914-1920.

== Career ==
Semchuk was raised in a close-knit Ukrainian-Canadian community, which greatly informed the theme of interconnected identity in her practice. Her work from the late 1970s involved dialogue and collaboration with her parents, partner, and young daughter. Semchuk's early photographic works have been said to belong to a "broad general category of documentary". Her photographic portrait works from this era, more specifically her 1982 series of eighty-seven photographs entitled Excerpts from a Diary, address themes of death and family whilst presenting a narrative of "self-examination and transformation" through her use of self-portraits and images containing domestic and prairie backgrounds.

Penny Cousineau-Levine, the author of Faking Death: Canadian Art Photography and the Canadian Imagination, writes of Excerpts from a Diary that the journey of Semchuk's protagonist "follows the structure of classic initiatory voyages of descent and return, death and rebirth, the prototype of which is the Greek legend … of Orpheus, who, grief-stricken at the death of his wife, descends to the underworld to convince the god Pluto to allow her to return to earth." Cousineau-Levine goes on to state that these photographic sequences "take the shape of heroic descent into darkness and peril, into an experience of death and nothingness followed by rebirth, a transformed relation to the self, and a renewed connection to life", something that she claims offers "an understanding of death that is particularly relevant to Canadian photography."

=== Collaboration with James Nicholas ===
James Nicholas and Sandra Semchuk were married until Nicholas died suddenly and unexpectedly in 2007. Nicholas was a Cree artist from Nelson House, Manitoba. He suffered extensively in residential schools as a child. Their collaborative work focused on the multiplicity of relationships to land, cultural geography, settler and indigenous relationships and memory.

=== Collaboration with Skeena Reece ===
In 2013, Sandra Semchuk worked with performance artist Skeena Reece on a piece titled Touch Me for the exhibition Witnesses: Art and Canada's Indian Residential Schools. During this performance, Reece and Semchuk struggle with themes of forgiveness and mother-daughter relationships as Reece bathes Semchuk.

== Education ==
- 1983 Master's degree in Photography, University of New Mexico
- 1970 Bachelor of Fine Arts, University of Saskatchewan, Saskatchewan
- 1970 Professional "A" Teachers Certificate, Province of Saskatchewan

== Select solo exhibitions ==
- 2016 The Stories Were Not Told, Comox Valley Art Gallery, Courtenay, British Columbia
- 1998 How Far Back is Home . . . ., Presentation House, Vancouver, British Columbia
- 1991 Coming to Death's Door, a daughter/ father collaboration, Presentation House, Vancouver, British Columbia
- 1991 Moving Parallel: Reconstructed Performances from Daily Life, Photographers Gallery, Saskatoon, Saskatchewan; Prince George Art Gallery, Prince George, British Columbia; University of Waterloo Art Gallery, Waterloo, Ontario; Robert McLaughlin Gallery, Oshawa, Ontario; Art Gallery of Windsor, Windsor, Ontario; MacKenzie Art Gallery, Regina, Saskatchewan; Nickle Arts Museum, Calgary, Alberta; Floating Gallery, Winnipeg, Manitoba; Gallery 44, Toronto, Ontario
- 1990 Paralleling the Bird, Forest City Gallery, London, Ontario; Contemporary Art Gallery, Vancouver, British Columbia
- 1986 Ritual, the Photographic Sequence, Forest City Gallery, London, Ontario
- 1986 The Coburg Gallery, Vancouver, British Columbia
- 1982 Excerpts from a Diary, Mendel Art Gallery, Saskatoon, Saskatchewan
- 1979 The Photographers Gallery, London, England
- 1975 The Photographers Gallery, Saskatoon, Saskatchewan
- 1973 The Photographers Gallery, Saskatoon, Saskatchewan

== Awards ==
- Governor General's Award in Visual and Media Arts (2018)"Governor General's Awards in Visual and Media Arts". en.ggarts.ca. Governor General of Canada.

== Collections ==
- Vancouver Art Gallery, Vancouver
- Canada Council Art Bank, Ottawa
- Canadian Broadcasting Corporation, Regina
- Canadian Museum of Contemporary Photography, Ottawa
- Dunlop Art Gallery, Regina
- Edmonton Art Gallery, Edmonton
- McKenzie Art Gallery, Edmonton
- Mendel Art Gallery, Saskatoon
- Mount St. Vincent University of Art Gallery, Halifax
- Museum of Modern Art, New York
- Photographers Gallery, Saskatoon
- San Francisco Museum of Modern Art, San Francisco
- University of New Mexico, Albuquerque

== Publications ==
- Bassnett, Sarah; Parsons, Sarah. "Sandra Semchuk" in Photography in Canada, 1839–1989: An Illustrated History. Toronto: Art Canada Institute, 2023. ISBN 978-1-4871-0309-5
- Semchuk, Sandra. 2018. "The Stories Were Not Told: Canada's First World War Internment Camps." The University of Alberta Press. Print.
- Semchuk, Sandra, and Laurel Tien. "Telling Story! Voice in Photography: An Online Visual Art Critical Studies Program Evaluation." International Review of Research in Open and Distance Learning 5.3 (2004): n. pag.ProQuest Education Journals [ProQuest]. Web. 17 Sept. 2016.
- Semchuk, Sandra. Toward Real Change: My Photographic Work Done in Saskatchewan from 1972 to 1982 and in New Mexico from 1982 to 1983. Diss. U of New Mexico, 1983. Albuquerque, New Mexico: U of New Mexico, 1983. Simon Fraser University Library Catalogue. Web. 17 Sept. 2016.
- Semchuk, Sandra. 1991. Coming to Death's Door: A Daughter/Father Collaboration. North Vancouver: Presentation House Gallery, 1992. Print.
- Semchuk, Sandra. 1989. Moving Parallel: Reconstructed Performances from Daily Life. Toronto: Gallery 44 Centre for Contemporary Photography, 1989. Print.
