= Humphrey Lloyd Hime =

Canadian photographer (1833–1903)

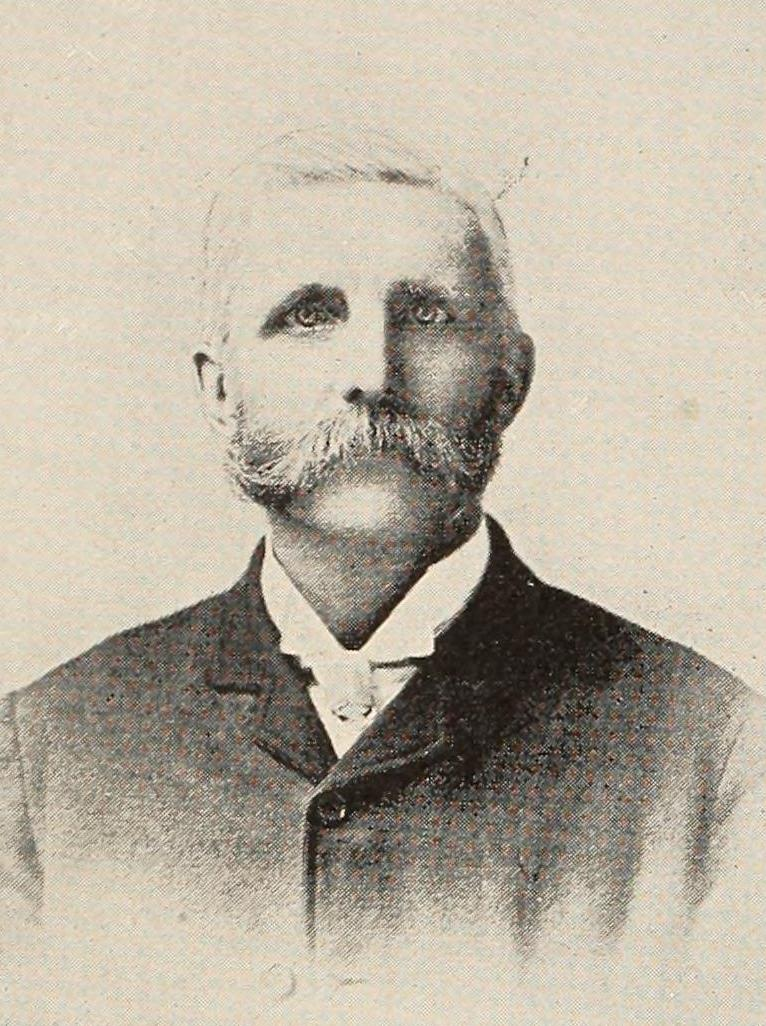
- Born: 17 September 1833; Moy, County Tyrone, Ireland
- Died: 31 October 1903; Toronto, Ontario, Canada

Humphrey Lloyd Hime (17 September 1833 – 31 October 1903) was an Irish-Canadian photographer, surveyor, businessman, and politician. He accompanied Henry Youle Hind on his 1858 Assiniboine and Saskatchewan Exploring Expedition, which was meant to assess the viability of settling Western Canada. After the expedition, Hime returned to Toronto and continued to work at the firm Armstrong, Beere and Hime, Civil Engineers Draughtsmen, and Photographists, and eventually held several municipal offices. The firm produced the Armstrong, Beere and Hime panorama in 1857, the earliest known photographs of Toronto.

In 1860, Hime established his own brokerage firm despite having no experience in stocks or brokerage, a trait shared with nearly half of Toronto's brokers at the time. Hime joined the Toronto Stock Exchange the following year, remaining a member until its collapse in 1869. He joined its replacement in 1871 and retained his membership until 1898. As a member of the TSE, he held various executive positions including Committee Member, Secretary, Treasurer, Vice President, and President.

== Early life and emigration ==
Hime was born in Moy, County Tyrone, Ireland, on 17 September 1833. At 15, he travelled to England to pursue an education in business and manufacturing. Moving to Canada in 1854, he soon acquired work with surveying crews in the Bruce Peninsula, working under W. H. Napier. In 1856, Hime joined the firm Armstrong and Beere. He was made a junior partner in December and the firm accordingly changed its name to Armstrong, Beere and Hime. While the precise date is unknown, the firm produced four sets of photographs of Toronto, either in 1856 or 1857. These were the first comprehensive series of photographs of the city. The sets were included in Toronto's unsuccessful application to the Colonial Office to become the capital of Canada.

== Hind expedition (1858) ==
In the mid-nineteenth century, a Canadian expansionist movement was blossoming. Hoping to expand west into territory owned by the Hudson's Bay Company, proponents of expansion needed to convince legislators and Canadians that moving westward was feasible and beneficial. To this point, the north-west had only been seen as a fur-trading hinterland, impossible to settle due to the inhospitable landscape of the Canadian Shield. To do so, several expeditions were funded by the Canadian and British governments in order to assess the viability of agrarian settlements in Rupert's Land. In 1857, expeditions led by Captain John Palliser and another led by George Gladman (and later Henry Youle Hind) were sent west to conduct land surveys. Both parties did not venture more than 200 miles north of the American border, exposing them to the oft-overlooked prairie region. Their analyses of this region caused expansionists to argue that western settlement was more viable than once thought.

Following his return from the Gladman expedition, Henry Youle Hind, a professor of geology at the University of Toronto, was financed to undertake a second expedition to the western interior. Hind approached Hime in spring 1858 and asked him to join the expedition as a photographer. It is speculated that Hind initially heard of Hime either through Hime's business partner William Armstrong, who was also a member of the Canadian Institute, or through W. H. Napier, who had gone on the 1857 expedition with Hind. The pair concluded negotiations in April, and Hime settled on the rate of £20 per month. Departing from Toronto on 29 April, the expedition moved to Detroit, through the Great Lakes, to Grand Portage, where they canoed to the Red River settlement, arriving 1 June. Upon their arrival, Hime took the first photograph of western Canada. He brought with him over 200 glass plates required for photo development, but it is unknown exactly how many photographs were taken, and only eight survived to 1975. Hime encountered resistance from Indigenous people whose photographs he tried to take, as they feared that the photographs would be used later to have them killed or removed from their lands.

Hime's performance on the expedition is subject to question. While Hind had initially been satisfied with Hime's conduct, he later wrote that Hime had " … neglected his duty, and proved a very undesirable companion on an expedition of this kind, retarding its progress and work". Hind did not elaborate in his complaints, but he may have been unsatisfied with the photographs Hime was taking, and the quality of those developed. With photography in its infancy, controlled environmental conditions, including humidity and temperature, were critical for clear photographs. In the western interior, however, these conditions could not be controlled, and Hime relied on stream water for developing his photographs.

Hime's photographs altered perceptions of the West. Instead of being seen as either tundra or an arctic wasteland, photographs of plains reinforced the belief that suitable agricultural settlements could be established. Hind described the "fertile belt" of the prairies and the forested region to the north. Politicians such as Thomas D'Arcy McGee would argue a decade later than "the future of the Dominion depends on our early occupation of the rich prairie land". In 1870 the Red River colony would be incorporated into the new province of Manitoba, and in 1873, the heart of the Red River colony, then Fort Garry, would become Winnipeg.

Upon returning to Toronto, Hime returned to working with Armstrong, Beere and Hime, and was responsible for developing the photographs to be submitted with the final report. He enlisted the help of his partner Daniel Beere, charging $80 for the services. Hind did not approve of the additional costs, and would only pay half of the fee, resulting in legal action being taken. Despite the disagreements between them, Hind understood the importance of the photographs, and had them placed within his book Narrative of the Canadian Red River Exploring Expedition of 1857 and the Assiniboine and Saskatchewan Exploring Expedition of 1858.

== Post-expedition, life in Toronto and death ==
Hime continued to work with Armstrong, Beere and Hime until the firm's closure in 1861. In 1860, Hime had established his own brokerage firm despite having no previous experience in the field, something he shared with nearly half of the city's brokers. He became a member of the Toronto Stock Exchange in 1861, holding various positions including Secretary, Treasurer, Vice President, and President. With no permanent headquarters, the TSE bounced between various members' offices, including Hime's brokerage office. Hime was president at the time of the Exchange's collapse in 1869, by which time membership had dropped from twenty-four members to six. Hime joined the reborn stock exchange in 1871, serving as its president in 1888–1889, and remained a member until 1898, when he passed his seat to his son A. G. Hime.

While in Toronto, Hime held various positions in the municipal government, including several elected offices. Entering electoral politics as an alderman in 1873, he went on to be a member of various committees: Finance and Assessment Standing Committee, Board of Health Committee, and the Jail Committee, while also becoming a justice of the peace in 1874. Despite retiring from politics only a year after joining, the city would rely on his services in later years with various financial matters.

Returning to the private sector, Hime worked for the Toronto Brewing and Malting Company and eventually became President of the Copland Brewing and Malting Company by 1882. In this capacity he was described as a man of "untiring zeal and energy, great popularity, and of thoroughly practical experience" by author Charles Mulvany.

Hime and his wife Christina would have eight children between 1861 and 1879. He died on 31 October 1903 in his home in Toronto at the age of 70. In his obituary, The Globe called him "...one of the best known and most highly esteemed agents in Toronto". His private funeral took place 2 November.

== Notable photographs ==
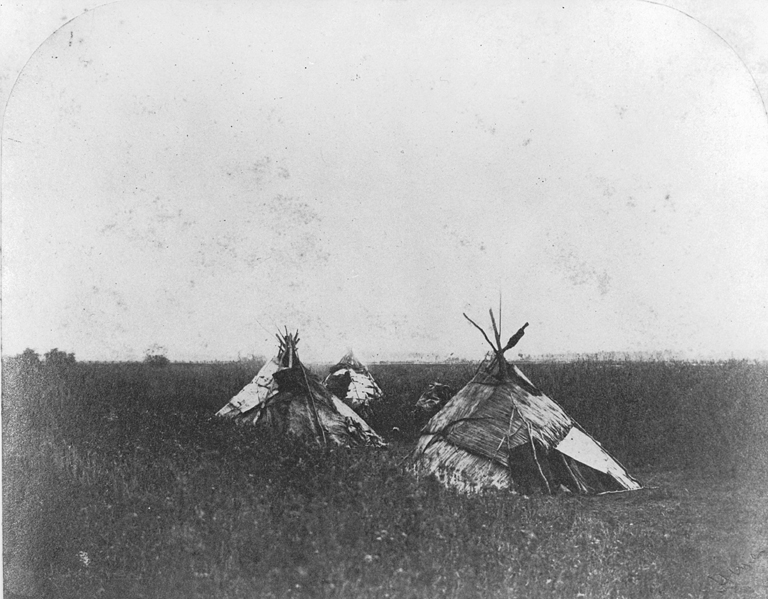
Tents on the prairie, west of the settlement (Red River), September - October, 1858

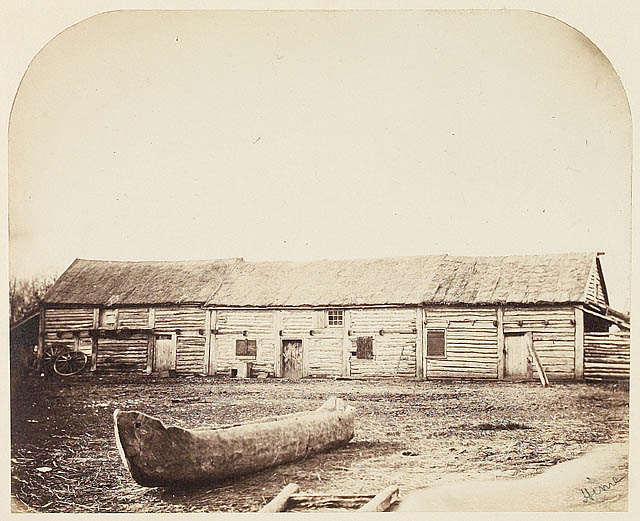
Mr. McDermot's Store was one of the first buildings erected in Fort Garry, September–October, 1858

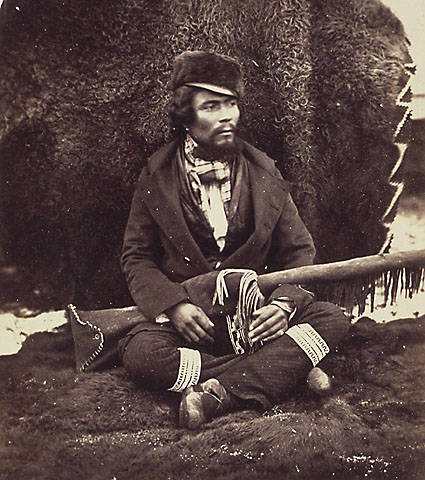
"Wigwam the Half-Breed," September–October, 1858

== See also ==
- Red River Colony
- Toronto Stock Exchange

== Sources ==
- Huyda, Richard J. (1975). Camera in the Interior, 1858: H. L. Hime, Photographer. Coach House Books.
