= Hanky Panky (painting) =

Painting by Kent Monkman

- Artist: Kent Monkman
- Year: 2020
- Medium: Painting
- Subject: Justin Trudeau

Hanky Panky is a 2020 painting by Two-spirit Cree artist Kent Monkman. It depicts a laughing group of Cree women as they watch Prime Minister Justin Trudeau, and Monkman's alter ego Miss Chief Share Eagle Testickle, prepare for consensual anal fisting, while past Canadian leaders look on. Kent Monkman generated controversy despite suggesting that the scene was a consensual act by including a reference to the hanky code. He later apologized for "any harm that was caused by the work." Indigenous critics disparaged Monkman's portrayal of sexual violence, especially his portrayal of Indigenous women participating in voyeuristic rape.

In 2020, Hanky Panky was purchased by Canadian lawyer and author Howard Levitt, who wrote a column in the National Post about his decision to purchase the painting.
