= William Valentine (painter) =

Nova Scotian painter (1798–1849)

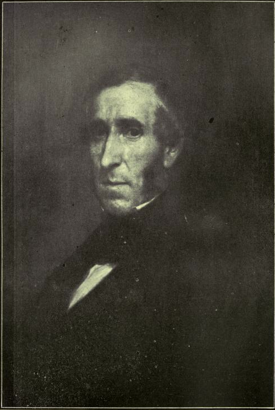
William Valentine - Self Portrait, Nova Scotia Archives and Records Management

William Valentine (1798–1849) was a portrait painter and daguerreotypist in Halifax, Nova Scotia.

== Life ==
Born in 1798 in Whitehaven, England, he migrated to Halifax in 1818. In 1822 he married Susannah Smith there, with whom he had two daughters. He married again in 1830 to Sarah Sellon. He died on 26 December 1849, and was buried at Camp Hill Cemetery, Halifax.

== Career ==
From 1819 he worked as a portrait painter, teacher, and painter of signs and architectural ornaments. In his early career, Valentine also worked as a house painter in periods that saw less commissions. He filled a void left by portrait painter Robert Field who had practiced in Halifax from 1808 to 1816. Valentine painted his subjects in a naturalistic, plain style distinct from that of contemporary European portraitists. His portraits often featured black-clad sitters against dark backgrounds.

Valentine studied painting in England in 1836, after which his work visibly improved. In 1839 he travelled to Paris where he learned the Daguerreotype process, an early form of photography, of which he was a pioneer in Canada as early as 1842. Valentine was a mentor and later a business partner of the photographer Thomas Coffin Doane.

In the 1830s and '40s he apparently worked in various places in Atlantic Canada, as evidenced by advertisements placed in Charlottetown, Saint John, and St. John's.

== Works ==
His main interest was in portraits, of which he painted about 125–150. The included many notaries of the day, including Thomas Chandler Haliburton, Alexander Keith and William Black. Although some paintings were destroyed in a studio fire shortly before his death, many of his works are preserved at the National Gallery of Canada, the Library and Archives Canada, the New Brunswick Museum, and the Art Gallery of Nova Scotia.

== Gallery ==
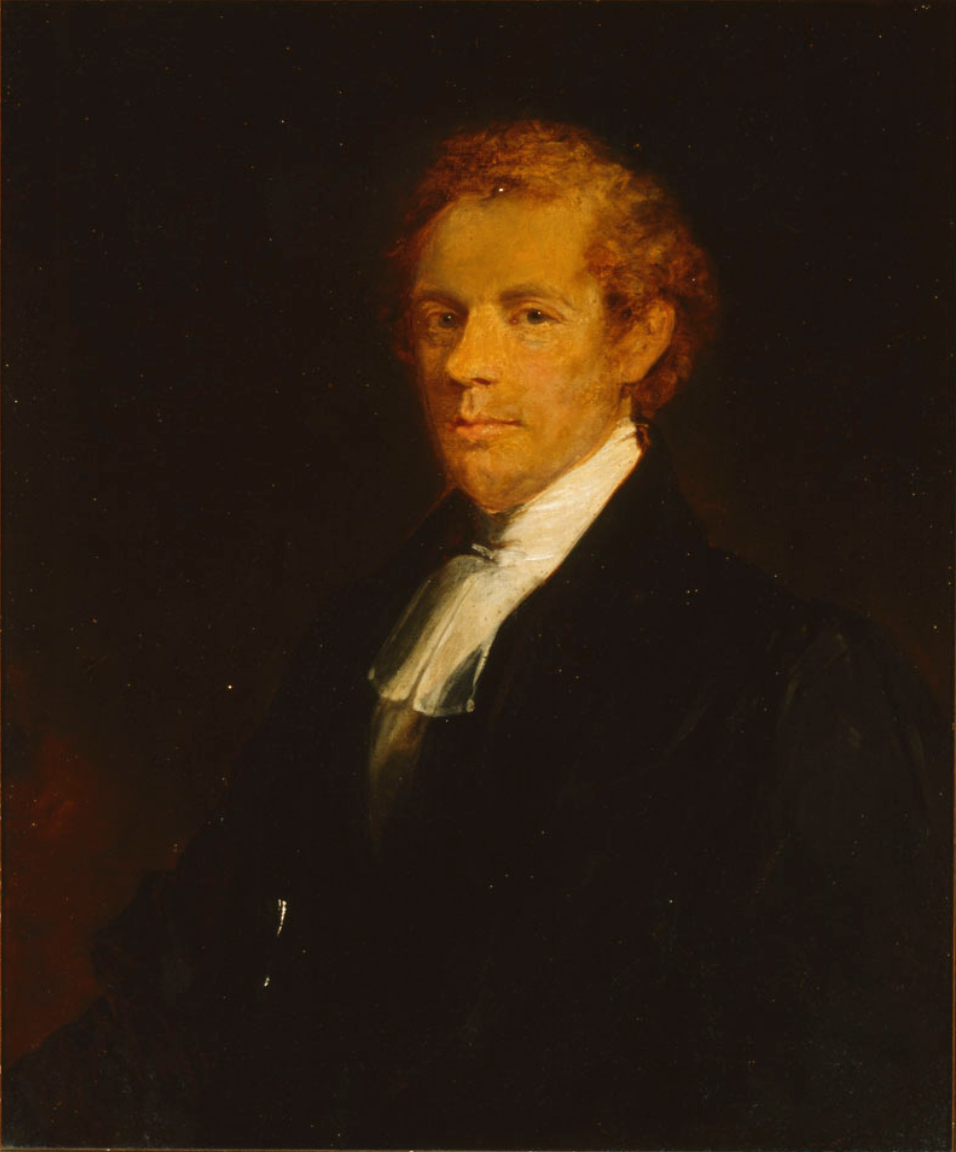
John William Ritchie

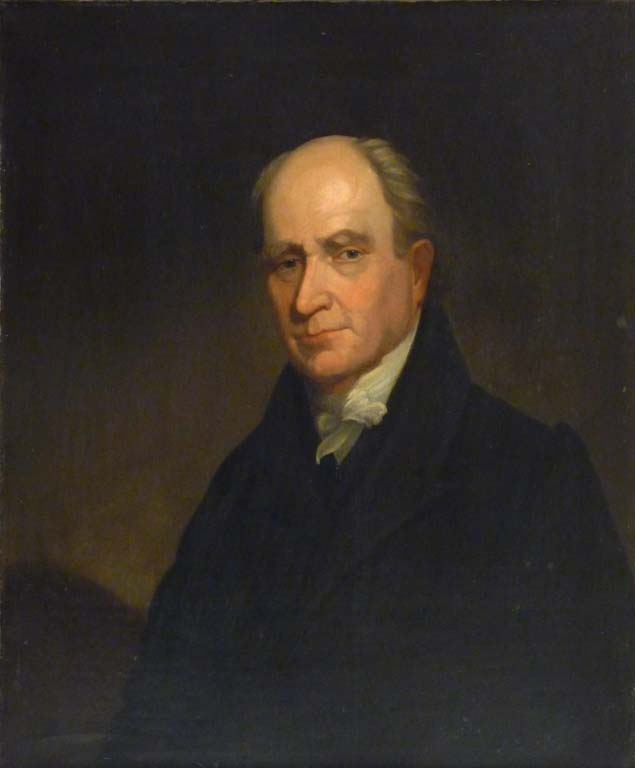
John Howe (loyalist)

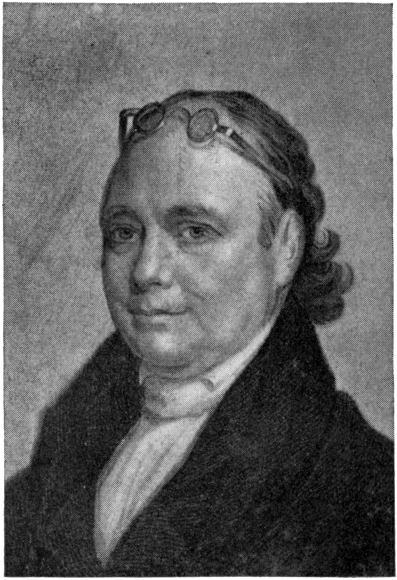
Rev William Black (Methodist)
