= Thomas Coffin Doane =

19th-century Canadian photographer

- Born: Thomas Coffin Doane; 1814; Barrington, Nova Scotia
- Died: 1896 (aged 81–82)
- Known for: daguerreotype photographer, portrait photographer

Thomas Coffin Doane (1814–1896) was a Canadian photographer. His work is held in the collections of the New York Public Library, the Royal BC Museum, the McCord Museum, the Library and Archives of Canada, among others.

== Early life ==
Doane was born in 1814 in Barrington, Nova Scotia, Canada.

== Work ==
In 1832 Doane began working as a portrait painter. In 1842 he went to Halifax, Canada to learn the daguerreotype process from William Valentine. In 1843, Doane and Valentine travelled to set up a daguerreotype photography business at the Golden Inn at St. Johns in Newfoundland under the name of Valentine & Doane. By 1846, he had established a clientele including subjects such as Jeffrey Howe, John Sartain, and Lord Elgin, Louis Joseph Papineau, among others. In 1865 he was no longer making photographs.

Following his practice with Valentine, Doane travelled to the West Indies before setting up a studio in Montreal.

== Personal life ==
In 1866 Doane moved to New York. He and his wife had a daughter, Kathleen Maud Doane, who married the American artist Childe Hassam.

== Gallery ==
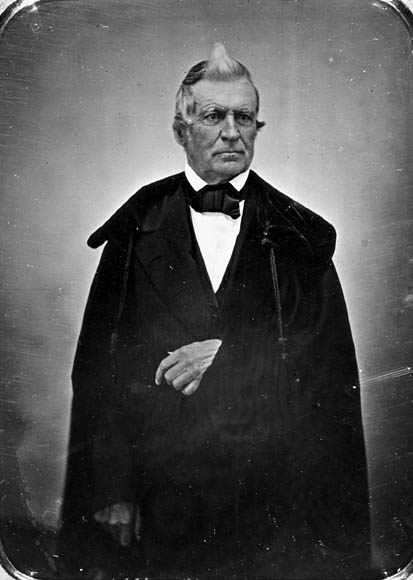
Louis-Joseph Papineau, c. 1852

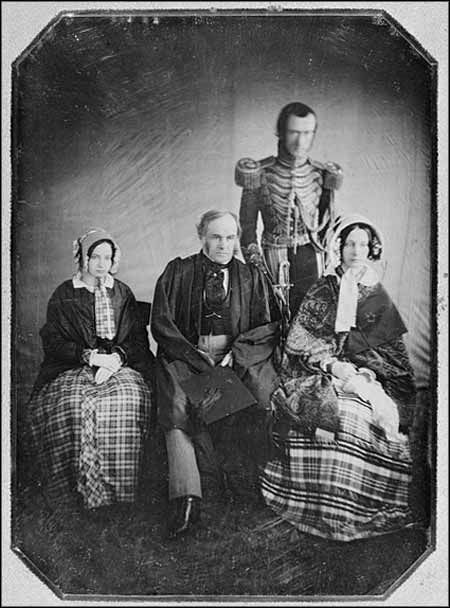
Earl and Countess of Elgin, Lady Lambton, Lord Kerr, 1848

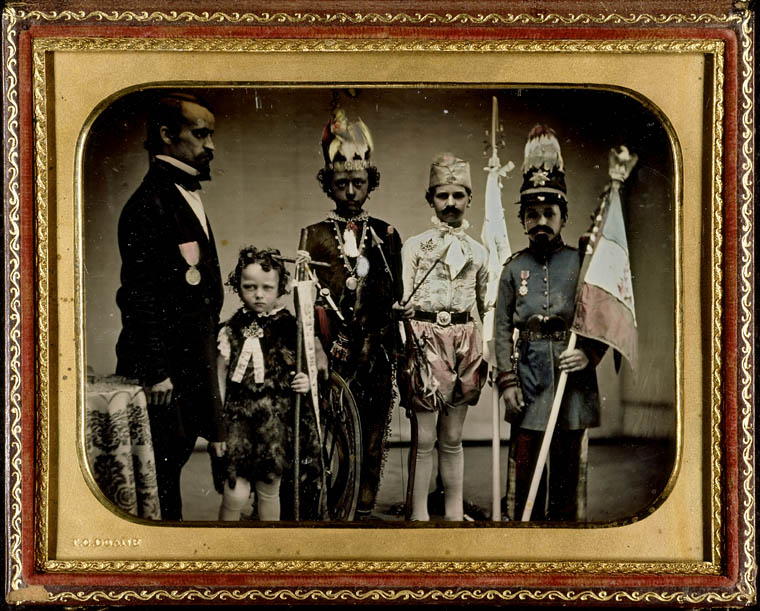
Saint-Jean Baptiste 1855

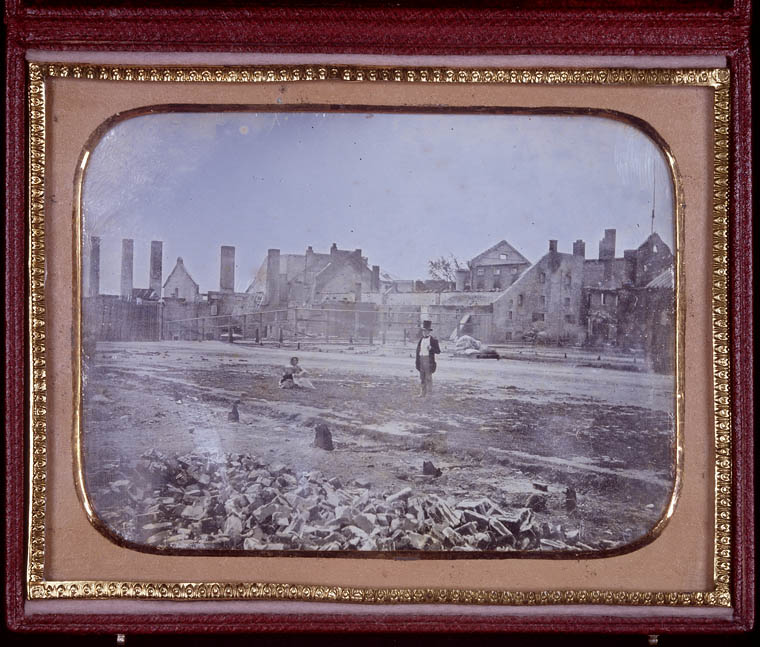
Molson family brewery after the fire of 1858

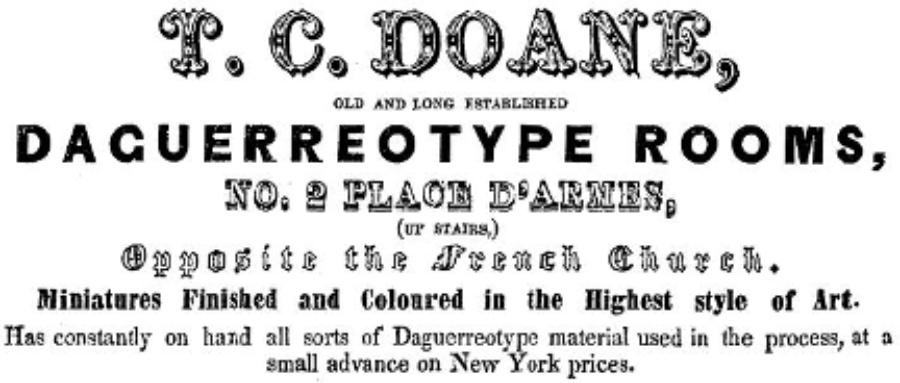
Advertisement for Thomas Coffin Doane studio in Montreal, 1865
