= Hokkani boro =

Romani term for a confidence trick

Hokkani boro, also called hakk'ni panki, is a term in the Romani language for "the great trick" or a con artist's scam. Hokkani boro is often practiced to gain a client's trust and then his or her money. The term is also known as "hokkeny bāro".

It refers to any of several methods used to bilk someone of their money, and may be the origin of "hanky-panky" in the English language to mean shady dealings, trickery, etc.

== Methods ==
According to Charles Godfrey Leland in his 1874 book English Gipsies and Their language, several different methods of practicing hokkani boro exist. In one of them, a con artist gives a client a spell, which is believed to make money double magically overnight. After the client sleeps on a bundle of money notes, the con artist returns and the money has seemingly doubled. When the client is convinced, they then give the con artist more money to double. They inform the client that the greater quantity of money must take more time to double and it must be left undisturbed, leaving con artist time to take the money and leave only money-sized pieces of paper in the bundle. Hokkeny Bāro suggests a relation between the Romani term for "sleight of hand", Huckneny Pokee, and the terms hanky panky and hocus pocus.
