= Christ Asleep during the Tempest =

Painting by Eugène Delacroix, Met

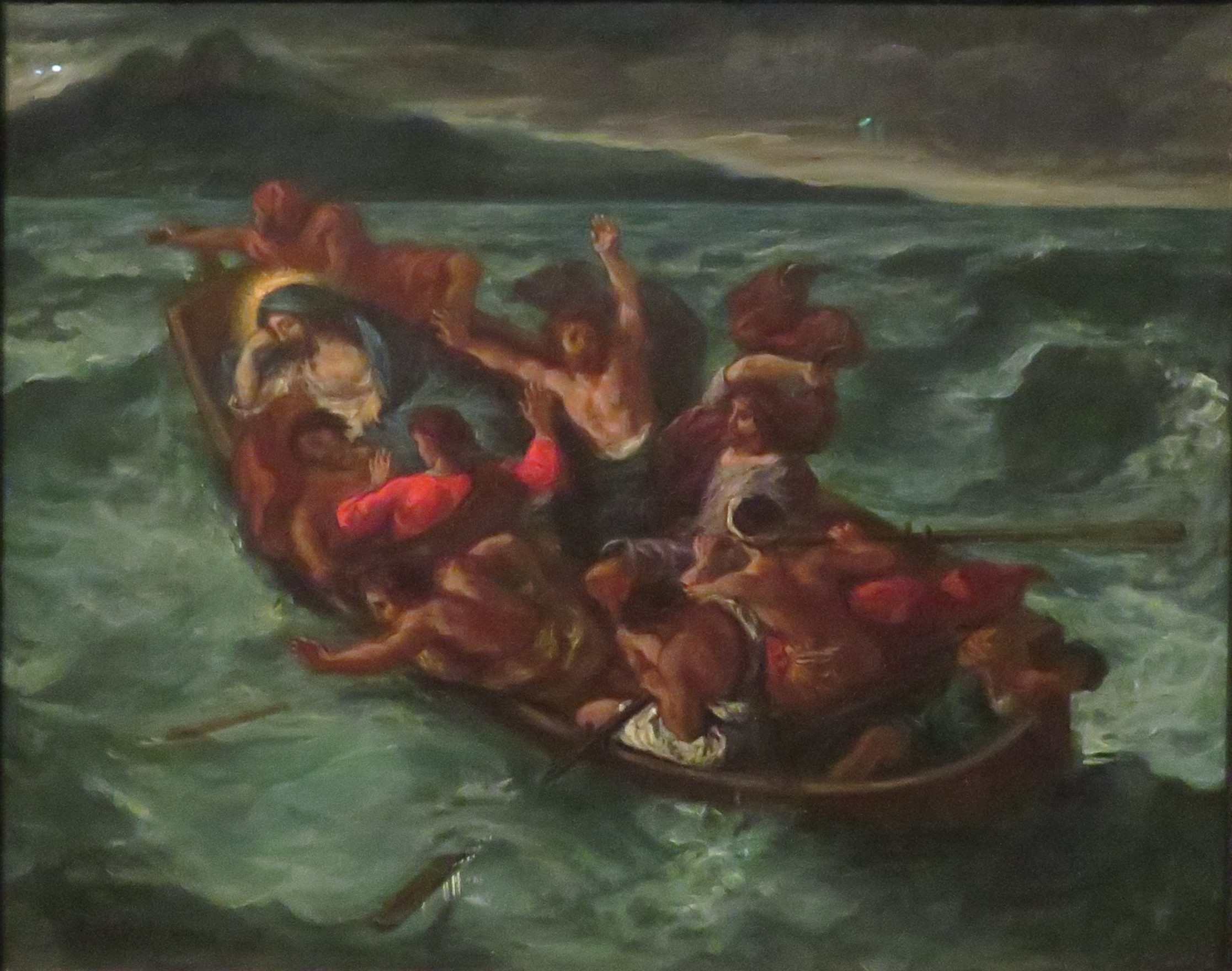
- Artist: Eugène Delacroix
- Year: ca. 1853
- Medium: Oil on canvas
- Dimensions: 50.8 cm × 61 cm (20 in × 21 in)
- Location: Metropolitan Museum of Art, New York

Christ Asleep during the Tempest is an oil on canvas painting by the French Romantic artist Eugène Delacroix, executed c. 1853. The painting is now in the Metropolitan Museum of Art in New York City.

Delacroix painted at least six versions of the biblical story of Christ sleeping during a storm while on the Sea of Galilee. After seeing the painting in 1886, while it was on display in Paris, Vincent van Gogh wrote: "Christ’s boat—I’m talking about the blue and green sketch with touches of purple and red and a little lemon yellow for the halo, the aureole—speaks a symbolic language through color itself."

== Gallery ==
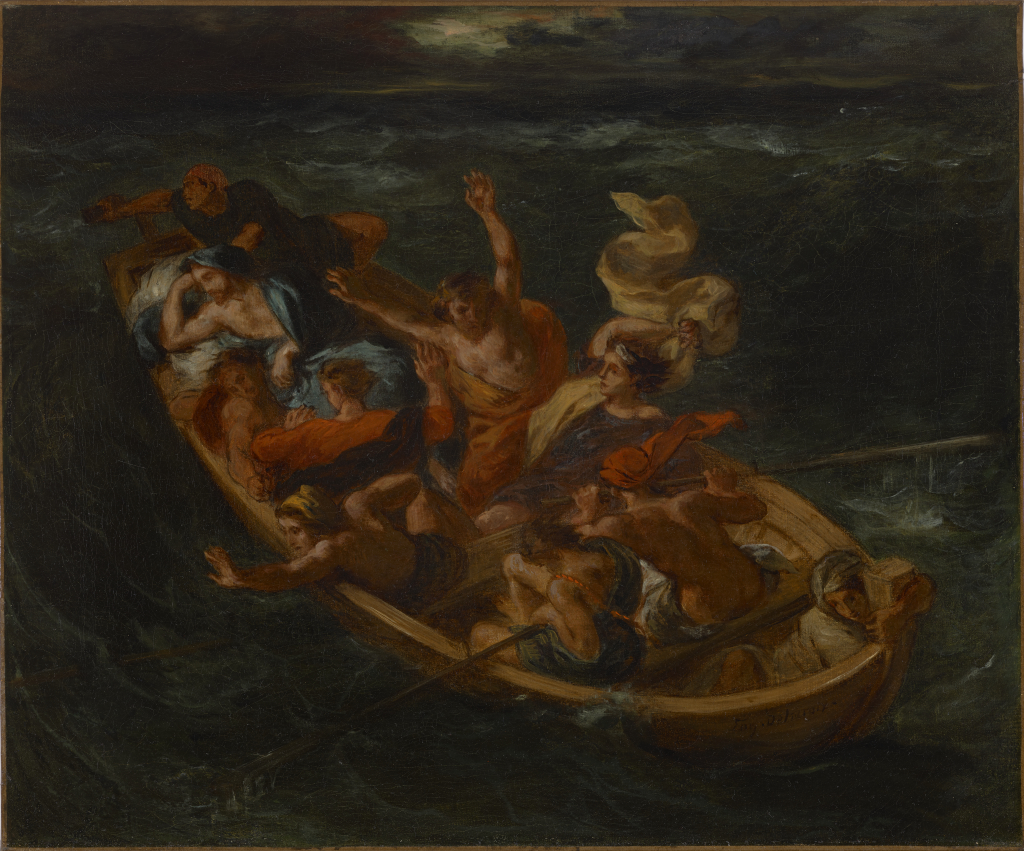
Christ sur le lac de Genesareth,
c. 1853
Portland Art Museum

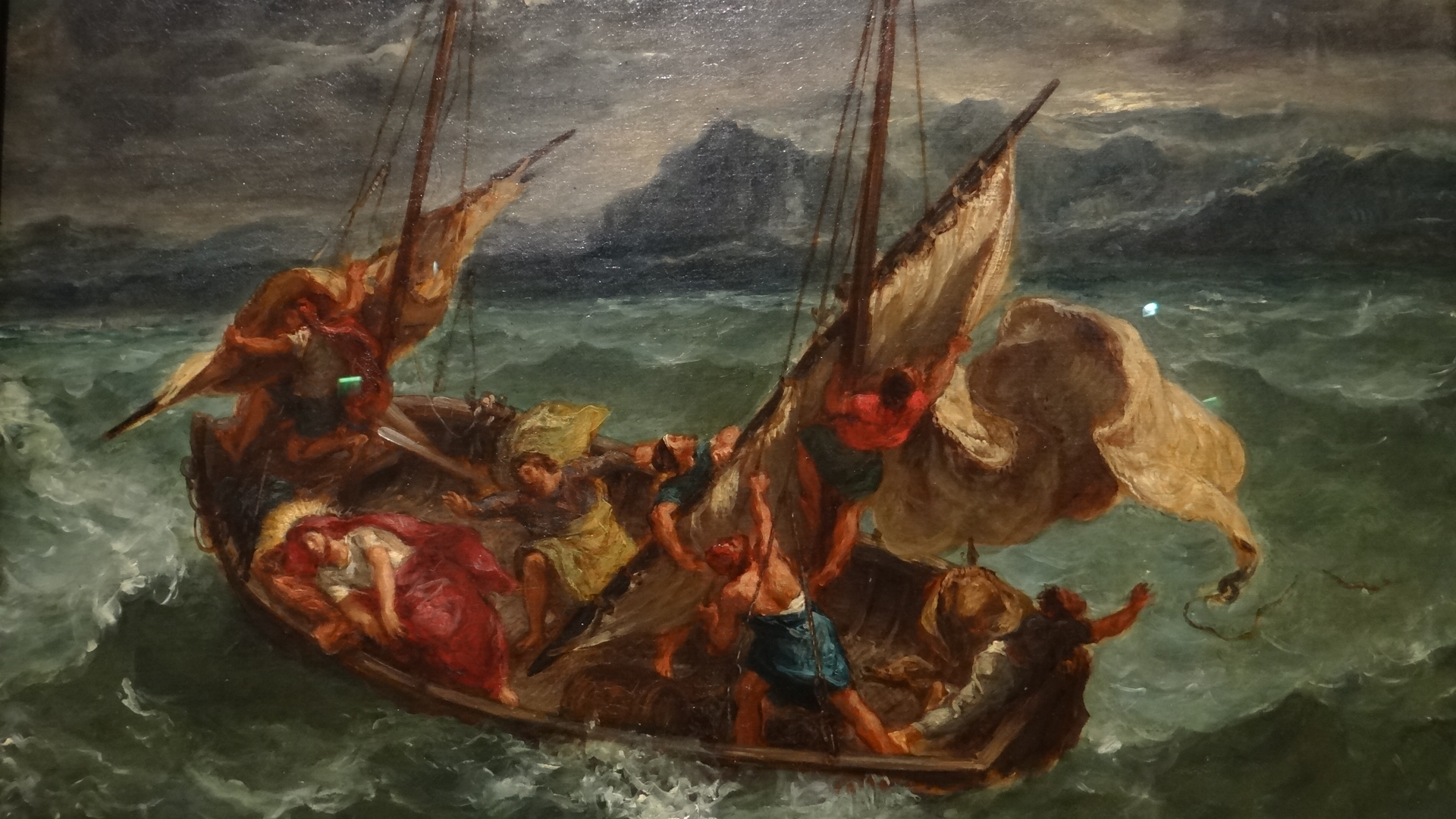
Christ sur le lac de Genesareth, 1854
Walters Art Museum
