= Henry Youle Hind =

Canadian geologist and explorer (1823–1908)

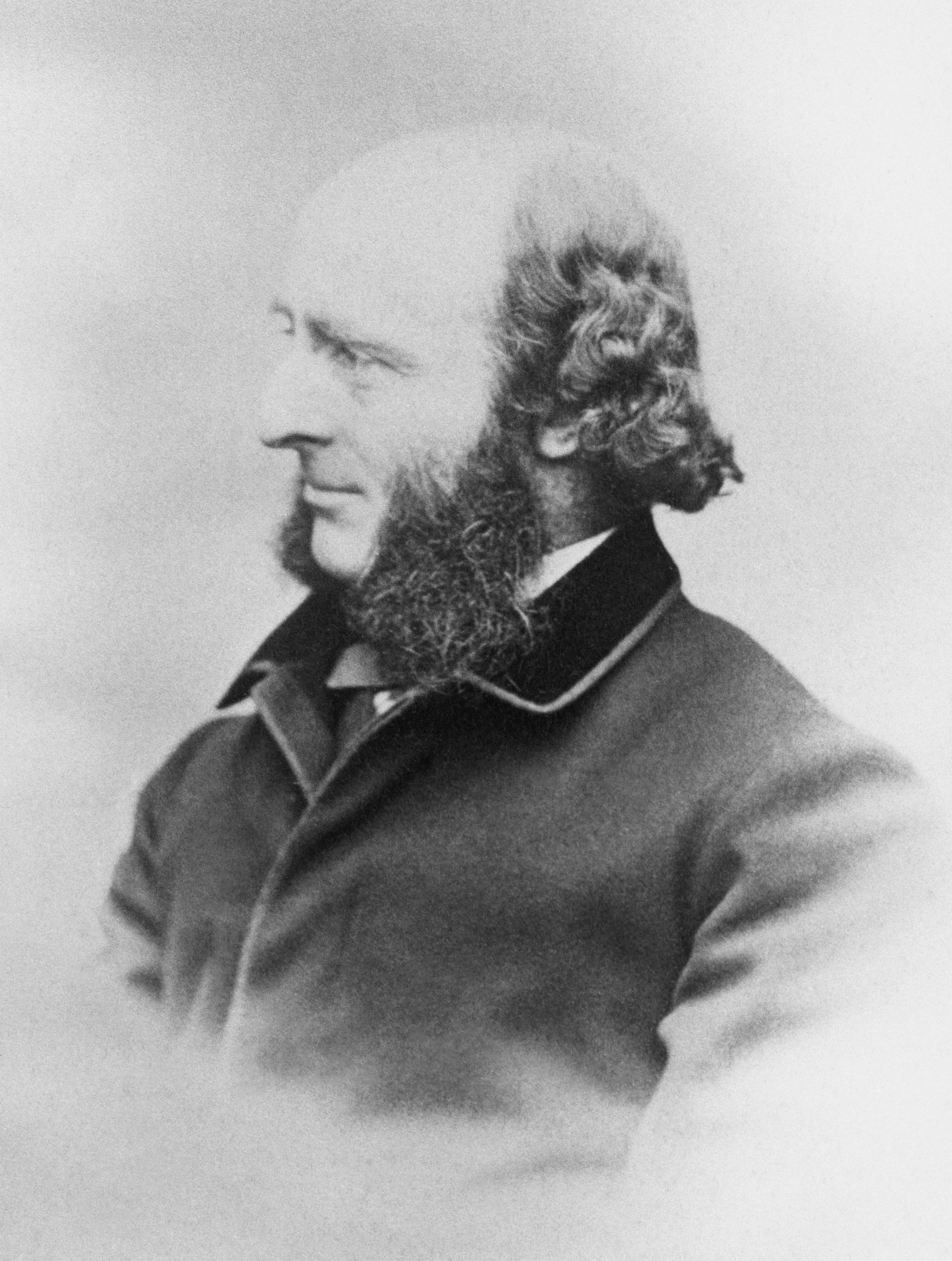
- Born: 1 June 1823; Nottingham, England
- Died: 8 August 1908 (aged 85); Maplewood, Nova Scotia
- Occupations: Geologist, geographer
- Writing career
- Period: 19th century
- Genres: History, narratives

Henry Youle Hind (1 June 1823 – 8 August 1908) was a Canadian geologist and explorer. He was born in Nottingham, England, and immigrated to Canada, settling in Toronto, Ontario, in 1846. Hind led expeditions to explore the Canadian prairies in 1857 and 1858. In 1857, he explored the Red and Assiniboine River valleys, and in 1858, the Assiniboine, Souris, Qu'Appelle, and South Saskatchewan River valleys. The expeditions are described in his reports Narrative of the Canadian Red River Exploring Expedition of 1857 and Reports of Progress on the Assiniboine and Saskatchewan Exploring Expedition. Hind's activities changed perceptions of the North West and helped open up the Canadian Prairies for agriculture settlement.

== Early life ==
Henry Youle Hind was born in Nottingham, England. He was the third son of Thomas Hind and Sarah Youle Hind. His older brothers were Thomas and James Fisher, the younger William. He also had a younger sister Sarah. On 7 February he married Katherine Cameron at York Mills. She was the second daughter of Lieutenant-Colonel Duncan Cameron. Their first child Thomas Francis Neil Hind was born in 1851. They settled in Toronto where they had four more sons and two daughters by 1863. Duncan Henry John Hind Rev 1853–1916 Katherine Sarah Youle Hind (Harley) 1855–1941 John Youle Hind 1858–1880 Kenneth C Hind Rev 1861–1923 James Archibald Hind1862–1868 Margaret Hind 1864–1927

Hind was responsible for much of his own education growing up, but did receive some formal schooling. He was taught the classics, mathematics, and penmanship at Nottingham Grammar School. In 1837 he went to study in Leipzig. In 1839 he returned to England and continued his studies in Nottingham for another four years. On 26 May 1843 Hind was accepted into Cambridge University but only stayed for one year.

In 1846, he immigrated to Canada where he settled in Toronto. In March 1847 he began his scientific career writing on a meteorological 'halo'. In October of that year he was employed by Egerton Ryerson. He was given a position at the Provincial Normal School in Toronto as a second master of science and mathematics. In 1850 he published Lectures on Agricultural Chemistry and the following year A Comparative View of the Climate of Western Canada. In December 1851 he became an early member of the Canadian Institute. From 1852 until 1855 he was the editor of the Institute's periodical the Canadian Journal. He was also employed as a professor of chemistry at the University of Toronto Trinity College, a position he held until 1864. Between 1856 and 1858 he published articles in the Canadian Almanac. These included The Future of Western Canada, Our Railway Policy, and The Great North-West.

== 1857 Red River Expedition ==
By the 1850s, British North America had reached a critical stage in its development. Since the 1837 Rebellions in Upper Canada and Lower Canada there had been an increase in immigration and construction of westward canals and rail lines. In the two Canadas agricultural land was becoming scarcer and higher in price. In the North-West of the continent, the fur trade networks were becoming unstable with the future of the west remaining in the control of the Hudson's Bay Company unlikely. New agricultural land was needed by people in the provinces of Upper Canada and Lower Canada. Out of this need for land a movement of expansionism was created in Upper Canada, north of the Great Lakes and the 49th parallel of latitude.

In Toronto and the Ottawa Valley prominent members of society including George Brown (1818-1880), and Alexander Mcdonnell sought to annex the North-West. To prove that the land in the North-West as suitable for agriculture and settlement, the British Royal ministry in London and Canadian provincial governments funded expeditions exploring west in 1857. The British expedition was formed by the Royal Geographical Society and was led by John Palliser (1817-1887). The Canadian expedition was led officially by George Gladman. Hind was recommended by the head of the Canadian Geological Survey, William Logan (1798-1875), to lead the scientific portion of the expedition. Throughout the expedition Hind was to collect information on topography, vegetation, soil and meteorological observations.

The Canadian expedition departed on 23 July 1857 from Toronto on the Northern Railway. The group included George Gladman, his son Henry, Simon Dawson, W. H. E. Napier, S. L. Russell, G. F. Gaudet, A. M. Wells, J. A. Dickenson and Robert Wynne. The expedition included a dozen Iroquois, representatives of the fur trade, a dozen Ojibwa natives, several French Canadians, a Scottish man and a Métis native man. The group arrived at Fort William by the end of the month.

The Palliser and Hind expeditions sought to prove that the previously uninhabitable fur trade lands of the North-West would be useful for agricultural development and immigrants from Upper and Lower Canada. These scientific expeditions were the most immediate consequences of the expansionist campaign. Ultimately the work of Palliser and Hind redefined public opinion and the perceived geography of the North-West. They created the idea of two vast sub-districts. Palliser's Triangle consisted of poor soil and was arid and uninhabitable. Hind's discovery, called the Fertile Belt, stretched from the Red River Settlement to the Saskatchewan River Valley and the Rocky Mountains. They reinforced the myth of good land in the north of Saskatchewan and the myth of bad land in the interior.

The Fertile Belt supported expansionist claims of an agricultural oasis. Hind was aware of this and noted it in his work on the expedition, Narrative of the Canadian Red River Exploring Expedition of 1857 and of the Assiniboine and Saskatchewan Exploring Expedition of 1858 stating that "it is a physical reality of the highest importance to the interests of British North America that this continuous belt can be settled and cultivated from a few miles west of the Lake of Woods to the Passes of the Rocky Mountains, and any line of communication, whether by waggon road or railroad, passing through it, will eventually enjoy the great advantage of being fed by an agricultural population from one extremity to another." The route that the Canadian expedition used was well known by fur traders and was also used by the Palliser Expedition. They reached Fort Frances by 19 August 1857. From there Hind and Simon Dawson split from George Gladman. They met six men and two canoes to cross the southern portion of the Lake of the Woods to portage the western shore of the Roseau River. Using the Roseau River, Hind and Dawson were to reach the Red River. This was not a usual route for fur traders.

On 22 August 1857 they reached Garden Island. This was a traditional Ojibwa settlement where they grew corn, potatoes, pumpkin and squash. On the Island Hind collected samples of corn which caused the group to be questioned by an Ojibwa raiding party. An unnamed Ojibwa man was quoted in Hind's Narrative as saying "to deny your request; but we see how the Indians are treated far away. The white man comes, looks at their flowers, their trees, and their rivers; others soon follow; the lands of the Indians pass from their hands, and they have nowhere a home. You must go by the way white man had hitherto gone. I have told you all." Following this encounter, Hind and Dawson were forced to take the traditional fur trade route down the Winnipeg River to the Red River.

Through the government commission of the 1857 expedition Hind was to complete three tasks. The first was to explore the Red River Settlement, the second to examine the Assiniboine River westward as far as Portage la Prairie and make inquiries in the Souris Valley about lignite coal. Third, Hind had to explore the Red River Valley southward to the Roseau River and examine the river well enough to understand the route from the Lake of the Woods. He only had one month from 9 September until 8 October to complete these tasks.

The expedition ended quickly; Hind was back in Toronto by 4 November 1857. Although he had left the North-West, the work of the expedition was not over. Hind printed a report on the expedition in 1858 that ran over four hundred pages in total length. His report was received well especially by the Globe, a newspaper run by expansionist George Brown. The reception of the Canadian expedition ensured another for the following year although this time it would be led by Hind and Simon Dawson.

== 1858 Assiniboine and Saskatchewan Expedition ==
The success of the 1857 expedition led to the creation of two Canadian expeditions led by Simon Dawson and Hind in 1858. Dawson was to evaluate the country from the Red River to Fort William for an immigration route. Hind's expedition was to look westward from the Red River to the south branch of the Saskatchewan River to examine territory for the possibility of settlement, coal mining in the Souris Valley and the salt springs of Lake Winnipegosis. The members of Hind's expedition included photographer and surveyor Humphrey Lloyd Hime, J.A. Dickenson, John Fleming, thirteen Iroquois, an Ojibwa man, and two French Canadians.

The group arrived at Grand Portage on 5 May 1858 and had arrived at the mouth of the Winnipeg River by the 29 May. It took some time to prepare the supplies and men for the expedition but they were in the field by 19 June. In addition to scientific information, Hind also collected information on the lifestyle of the Plains Cree. In 1857 the Plains Cree in council had decided that no white man should be allowed to hunt in or travel through their country due to multiple broken promises and the destruction of the buffalo. Hind was witness to the collapse of the hunting economy of the old North-West. By 18 September 1858 Hind's expedition was beginning its last phase. By 28 December he was back in Toronto.

== Later career ==
Following Hind's return to Toronto he resumed his teaching position at University of Toronto, Trinity College and membership to the Royal Canadian Institute. He prepared a report on the 1858 expedition and attempted to organize a third expedition to the Bow River and the Rocky Mountains. An economic depression in 1857 left the Canadian government wary of further expenditures on scientific expeditions so Hind's proposal was declined. In 1859 he published Of Some of the Superstitions and Customs Common Among the Indians in the Valley of the Assiniboine and Saskatchewan in the Canadian Journal. After 1859, Hind attempted to resume exploring and publishing. During the winter of 1859-1860 Hind returned to England to see his Narrative published. In 1861 he planned an expedition to the North-East. He sought to survey the land around the Labrador Peninsula. This was not a government funded expedition. In 1863 he published a report on this expedition entitled Explorations in the Interior of the Labrador Peninsula in two volumes. In 1864 Hind left his job at Trinity College after being invited to speak at the Royal Geographical Society. Once back in Toronto he was invited by Peter Mitchell of New Brunswick to have their geological resources surveyed. Hind left Toronto in May for New Brunswick. At the same time as Hind's geological survey, another was being led by L. W. Bailey and G. F. Matthew. Only one of these surveys was to be paid a sum of five hundred dollars by the Canadian government. While the government was deciding which report would be used, an anonymous editorial was published in The Headquarters, a local daily in Fredericton which scrutinized the work of Bailey and Matthew. It was believed that Hind was the author of the editorial and it had serious consequences for him. He lost his reputation among workers in the same field and was not employed as the provincial geologist of New Brunswick.

In September 1864 Hind settled his family in Fredericton. In July 1865 his eldest son drowned while bathing in the Saint John River. The family remained in Fredericton until the following year. In the fall of 1866 the Hind family moved to Windsor, Nova Scotia where the boys attended King's College and the girls Edgehill. Two of Hind's other sons died; James Archibald of unknown causes after the move to Windsor and John Youle of typhoid in 1880. In Windsor Hind was employed by the Mineral Exploration and Mining Association of Nova Scotia. In 1876 he was invited by Francis von Ellerhausen to make a geological survey of Labrador. Two years later he displayed a map of the oceanic currents in the region. From 1884 until his death in 1908 Hind wrote no more on any scientific or public subject. He became focused on the local history of Windsor. In 1889 he published a history of the Old Burying Ground and in 1890 the Centennial History of King's College. In February 1906 he became ill and died on 8 August 1908. He was buried in Maplewood, Nova Scotia.

Hind was named a National Historic Person in 2018.

== Works ==
- The Canoe Route Between Fort William...Fort Garry...1857, (1858)
- Lake Superior And The Red River Settlement, (1859)
- North-West Territory..., (1859)
- Reports Of...Assiniboine & Saskatchewan Exploring Expedition, (1859)
- Narrative Of The Red River Exploring Expedition Of 1857, (1860)
- A Sketch Of An Overland Route To British Columbia, (1862)
- Explorations In The Interior Of The Labrador Peninsula, (1863)
- Eighty Years' Progress Of British North America, (1863)
- The Dominion Of Canada, (1869)

== Sources ==
- Friesen, Gerald (1987). The Canadian Prairies: A History. University of Toronto. ISBN 0-8020-6648-8.
- Hind, Henry Youle (1860). Narrative of the Canadian Red River Exploring Expedition of 1857 and of the Assiniboine and Saskatchewan Exploring Expedition of 1858. London: Longman, Green, Longman, and Roberts.
- Morton, W.L. (1980). Henry Youle Hind. University of Toronto Press. ISBN 0-8020-3278-8.
- Owram, Doug (2007). Francis, R. Douglas; Kitzan, Chris (eds.). The Promise of the West as Settlement Frontier. University of Calgary Press. p. 3. ISBN 978-1-55238-230-1.
- Sissons, C.B. (1947). Egerton Ryerson: His Life and Letters Vol. 1. Toronto.
