= Penny Cousineau-Levine =

Canadian photography theorist, curator, artist and professor

Penny Cousineau Levine
- Born: March 31, 1947 (age 79); Fredericton, New Brunswick
- Occupations: theorist, curator, artist, professor
- Notable work: Faking Death: Canadian Art Photography and the Canadian Imagination

Penny Cousineau-Levine (born March 31, 1947) is a Canadian photography theorist, curator, artist and professor.

== Life ==
Cousineau-Levine was born in Fredericton, New Brunswick. She holds a Bachelor of Arts in English literature from the University of Manitoba (1969) and a Master of Fine Arts from the Visual Studies Workshop in Rochester, New York (1974).

Cousineau is a full professor in the department of visual arts at the University of Ottawa.

== Work ==
Cousineau-Levine is known for her book Faking Death: Canadian Art Photography and the Canadian Imagination, published by McGill-Queen's University Press in 2003. In this publication, she explores the specificity of Canadian photography from 1950 to 2000. The book includes reproductions and observations on more than 120 Canadian photographers, including Michel Lambeth, Charles Gagnon, Diana Thorneycroft, Sandra Semchuk, Geoffrey James and Raymonde April. Through this book, Cousineau-Levine argues that Canadian art photography is preoccupied with death. The author posits that unlike American and European photography that is grounded in the literal, material world, Canadian art photography is not tied to a referent, but rather exists in an “in- between” or liminal state. Cousineau-Levine is also known for the gallery "Alone", which is a two-part gallery exploring the theme of being alone through the lens of eight different photographers.

== Collections ==
Several of Cousineau-Levine's early photographic works are included in the permanent collection of the National Gallery of Canada.
