= Museum of Fine Arts, Boston =

Art museum in Boston, Massachusetts

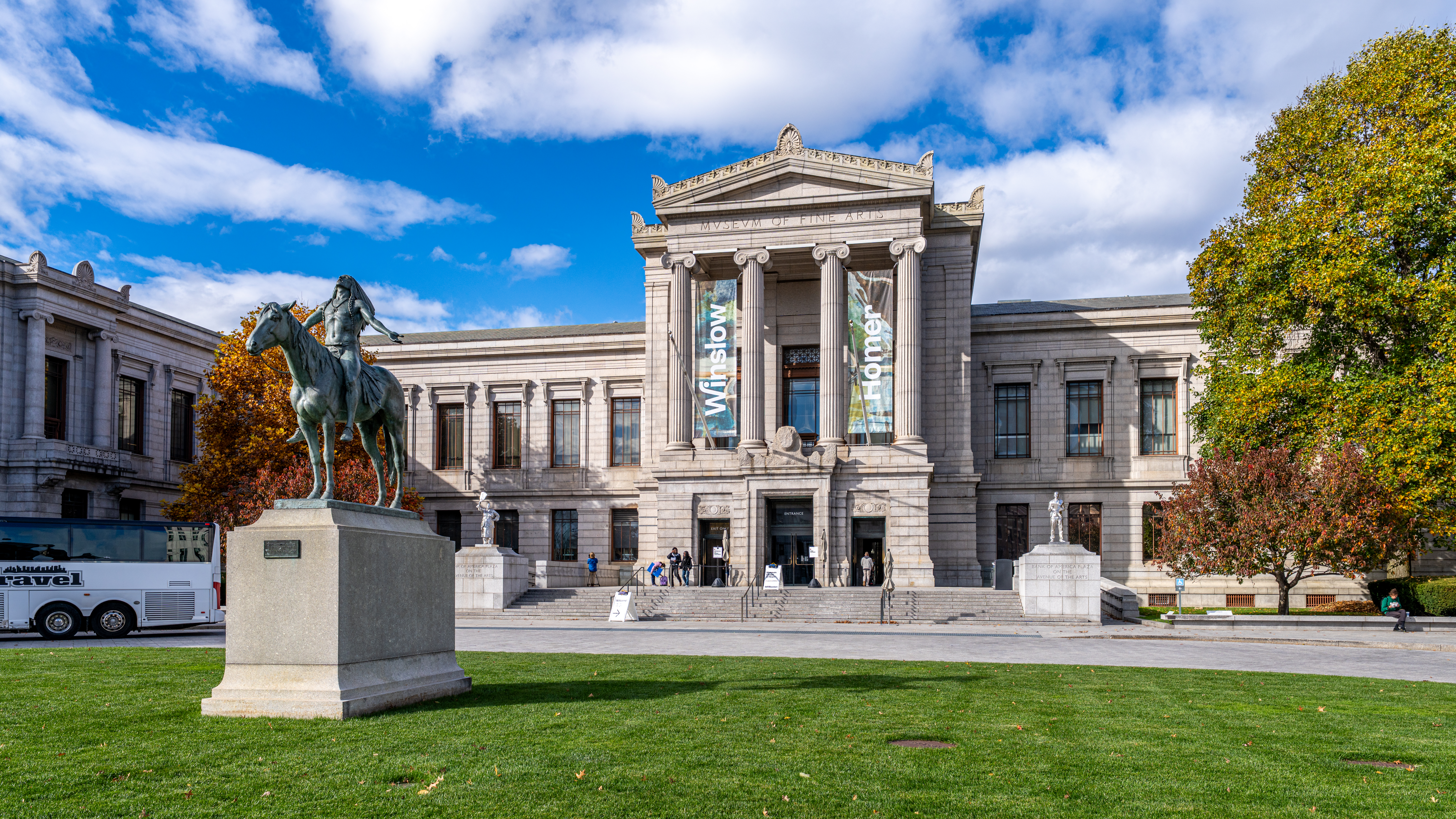
- Museum of Fine Arts main entrance with Cyrus Dallin’s Appeal to the Great Spirit in the foreground and Alan Michelson’s “The Knowledge Keepers” flanking the museum steps in the background, 2025.

- Location within Boston Location within Massachusetts Location within the United States
- Interactive fullscreen map
- Established: 1870
- Location: 465 Huntington Avenue; Boston, Massachusetts, 02115
- Coordinates: 42°20′22″N 71°05′39″W
- Type: Art museum
- Accreditation: AAM
- Visitors: 1,249,080 (2019)
- Director: Pierre Terjanian
- Architects: Guy Lowell, Hugh Stubbins, I.M. Pei, Foster + Partners (London)
- Public transit access: Green Line (E branch) Museum of Fine Arts Orange Line Ruggles Franklin/Foxboro Line Ruggles Providence/Stoughton Line Ruggles
- Website: mfa.org

The Museum of Fine Arts (often abbreviated as MFA Boston or MFA) is an art museum in Boston, Massachusetts. It is the 25th-largest art museum in the world, measured by public gallery area. The Museum owns more than 500,000 works of art, with over 8,000 paintings, in a notably encyclopedic museum collection. With 1.05 million visitors it was the 72nd-most-visited art museum in the world in 2025.

Founded in 1870 in Copley Square, the museum moved to its current Fenway location in 1909. It is affiliated with the School of the Museum of Fine Arts at Tufts (SMFA Tufts), having transferred responsibility of operations of the SMFA to Tufts University in 2016.

== History ==
=== 1870–1907 ===
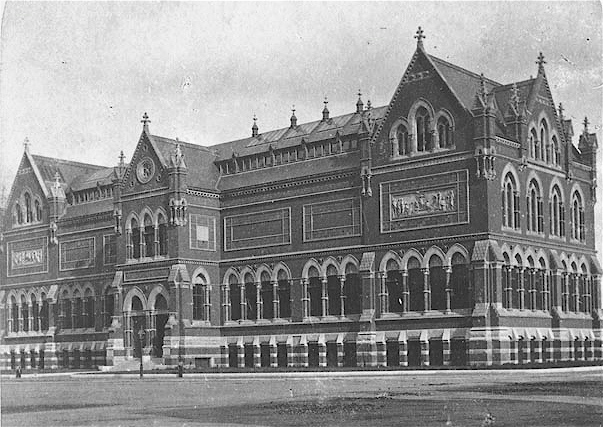
A 19th illustration of the original Museum of Fine Arts building in Copley Square

The Museum of Fine Arts was founded in 1870 and was initially located on the top floor of the Boston Athenæum. Most of its initial collection came from the Athenæum's Art Gallery. In 1876, the museum moved to a highly ornamented brick Gothic Revival building designed by John Hubbard Sturgis and Charles Brigham, noted for its massed architectural terracotta. It was located in Copley Square at Dartmouth and St. James Streets. It was built almost entirely of brick and terracotta, which was imported from England, with some stone about its base. After the MFA moved out in 1909, this original building was demolished, and the Copley Plaza Hotel (now the Fairmont Copley Plaza) replaced it in 1912. During the early years of the museum, Charles Greely Loring, a former Union Army general, served as its first director, leading from 1876 to early 1902 when he resigned for health reasons.

=== 1907–1999 ===
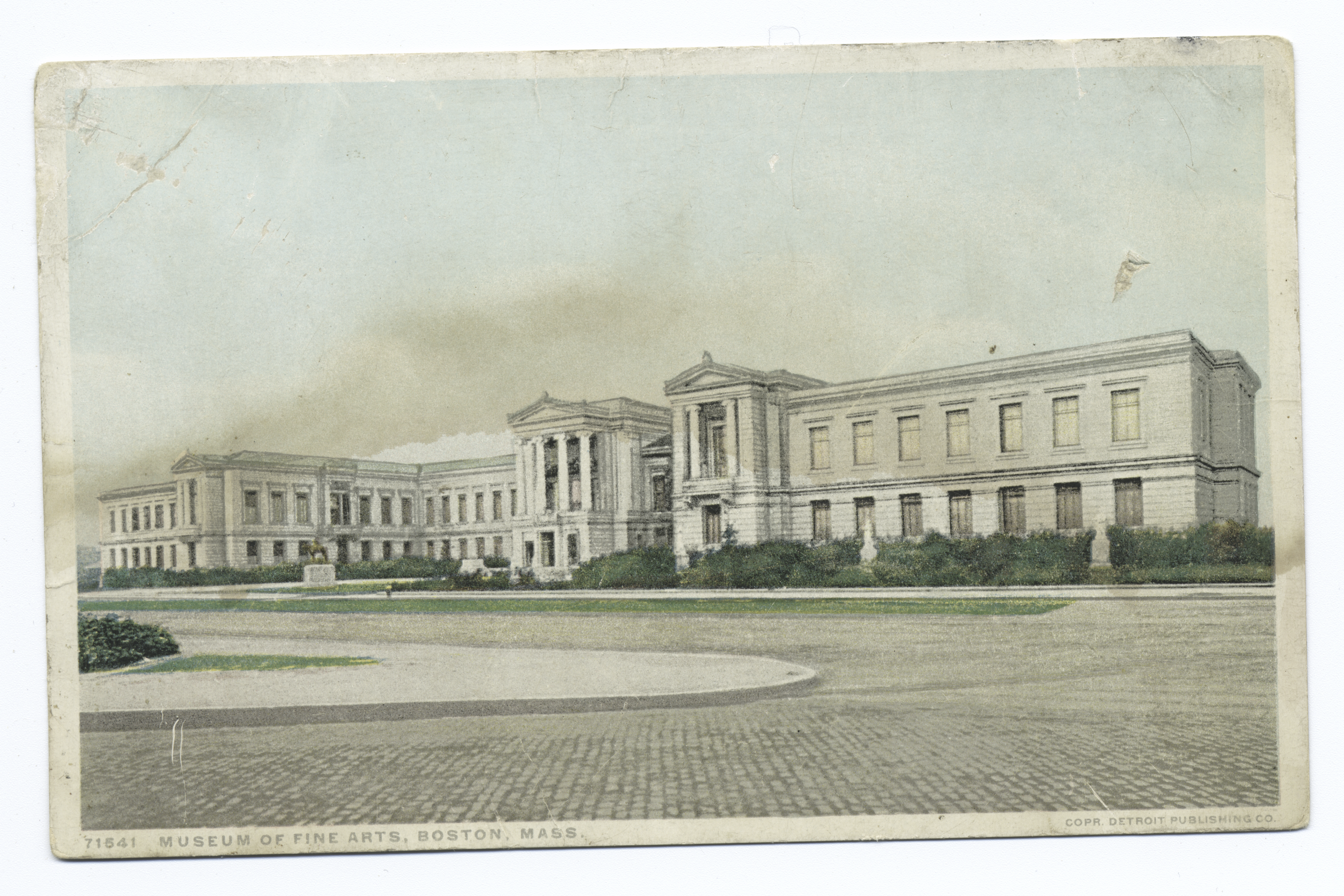
New MFA building in the Fenway, c. 1913–1918

In 1907, plans were laid to build a new home for the museum on Huntington Avenue in Boston's Fenway–Kenmore neighborhood, near the recently opened Isabella Stewart Gardner Museum. Museum trustees hired architect Guy Lowell to create a design for a museum that could be built in stages, as funding was obtained for each phase. Two years later, the first section of Lowell's neoclassical design was completed. It featured a 500-foot (150 m) façade of granite and a grand rotunda. The museum moved to its new location in 1909.

The second phase of construction built a wing along The Fens to house painting galleries. It was funded entirely by Maria Antoinette Evans Hunt, the wife of wealthy business magnate Robert Dawson Evans, and opened in 1915. From 1916 through 1925, the noted artist John Singer Sargent painted the frescoes that adorn the rotunda and the associated colonnades, using a young Black model, Thomas McKeller, as his inspiration for Apollo and the other Greek gods depicted in these murals.

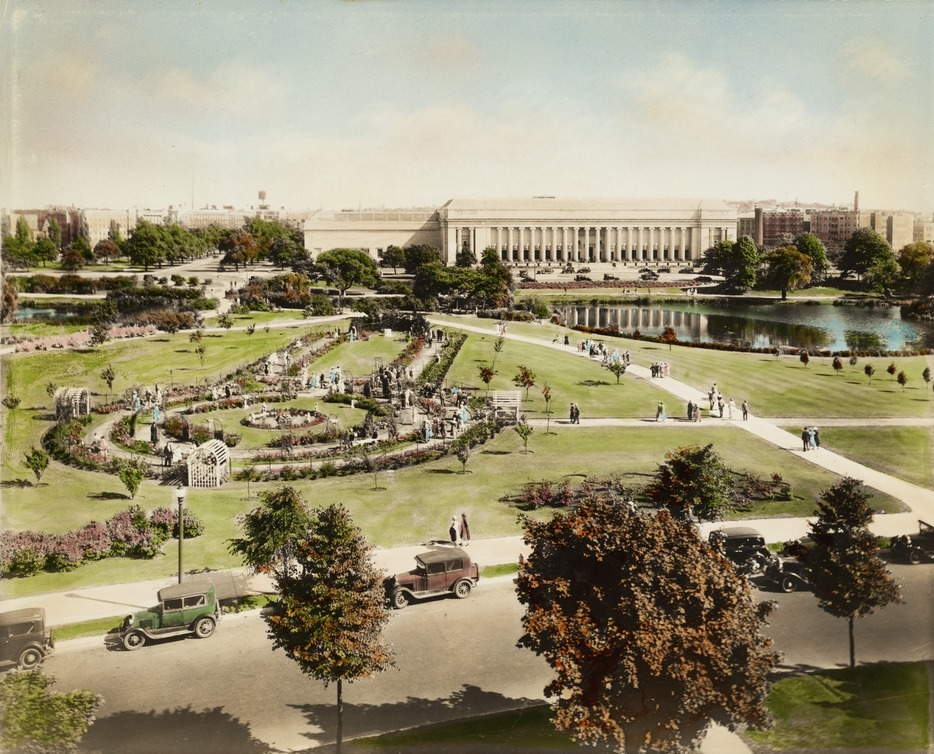
Rose Garden and Museum of Fine Arts, Fenway, in June 1934

The Decorative Arts Wing was built in 1928, and expanded in 1968. An addition designed by Hugh Stubbins and Associates was built in 1966–1970, and another expansion by The Architects Collaborative opened in 1976. The West Wing, now the Linde Family Wing for Contemporary Art, was designed by I. M. Pei and opened in 1981. This wing now houses the museum's cafe, restaurant, meeting rooms, classrooms, and a giftshop/bookstore, as well as large exhibition spaces. In 1978, the Asiatic Wing was closed because the lack of climate control was jeopardizing the collection. A new control system was contingent upon the completion of the West Wing, and the Asiatic Wing reopened in 1982. The Tenshin-En Japanese Garden designed by Kinsaku Nakane opened in 1988, and the Norma Jean Calderwood Garden Court and Terrace opened in 1997.

=== 2000–present ===
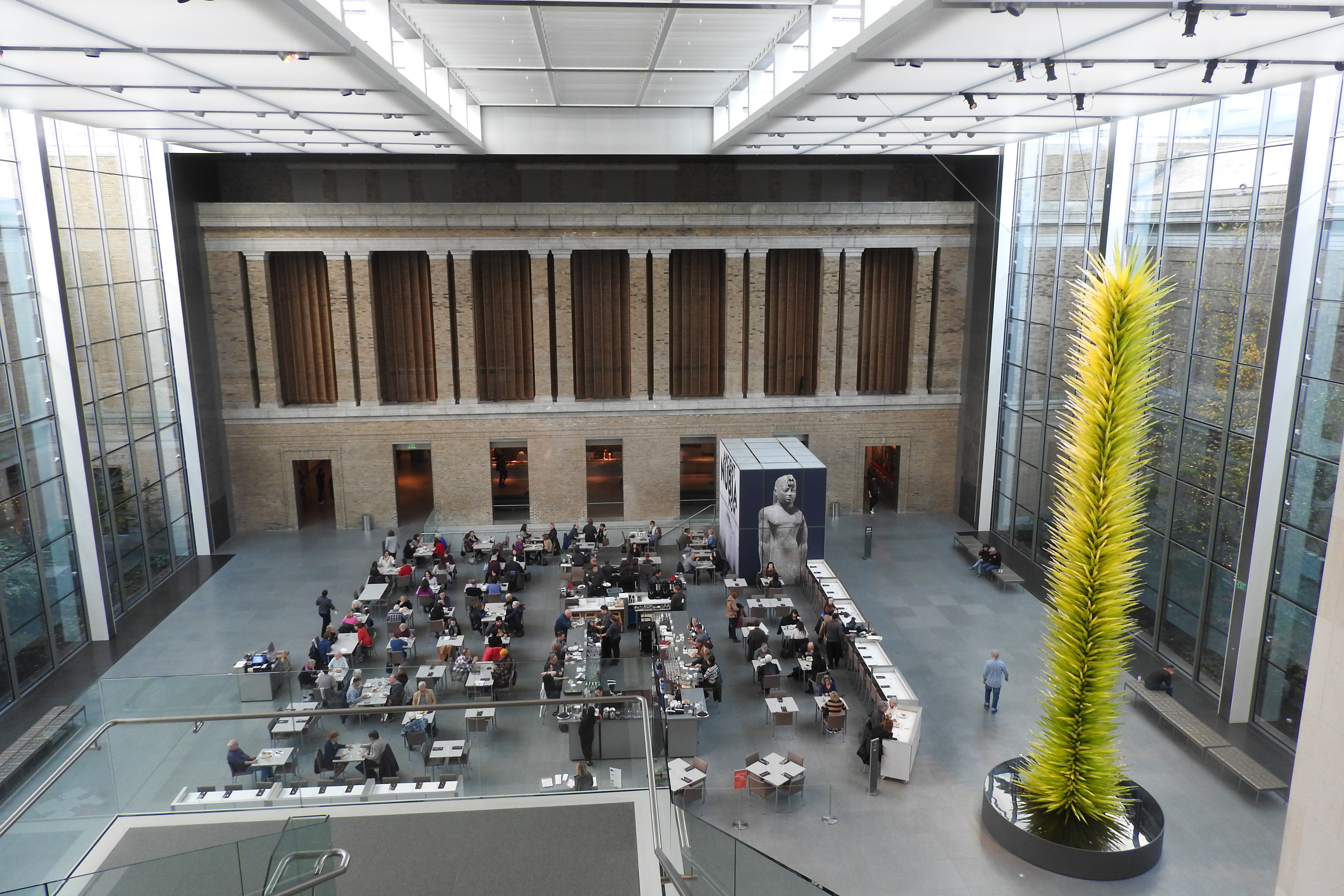
The Shapiro Courtyard, which houses Dale Chihuly's Lime Green Icicle Tower (right), is used to host large banquets and other events.

In the mid-2000s, the museum launched a major effort to renovate and expand its facilities. In a seven-year fundraising campaign between 2001 and 2008 for a new wing, the endowment, and operating expenses, the museum managed to receive over $500 million, in addition to acquiring over $160 million worth of art.

In 2007, the MFA announced its purchase of a nearby building then occupied by the Forsyth Institute, a dental and craniofacial research organization located at 140 Fenway. The original Beaux Arts building dates from around 1910, and was later expanded with a Brutalist annex building. The entire property comprised approximately 107,000 square feet (9,900 m^{2}) on 1.6 acres (0.65 ha) of land, located across the street from the main MFA building. As of 2023, the building is leased to nearby Northeastern University.

During the Great Recession, the museum's annual budget was trimmed by $1.5 million. The museum increased revenues by organizing traveling exhibitions, which included a loan exhibition sent to the for-profit Bellagio in Las Vegas in exchange for $1 million. In 2011, Moody's Investors Service calculated that the museum had over $180 million in outstanding debt. However, the agency cited growing attendance, a large endowment, and positive cash flow as reasons to believe that the museum's finances would become stable in the near future. In 2011, the museum put eight paintings by Monet, Renoir, Pissarro, Sisley, Gauguin, and others on sale at Sotheby's, bringing in a total of $21.6 million, to pay for Man at His Bath by Gustave Caillebotte at a cost reported to be more than $15 million.

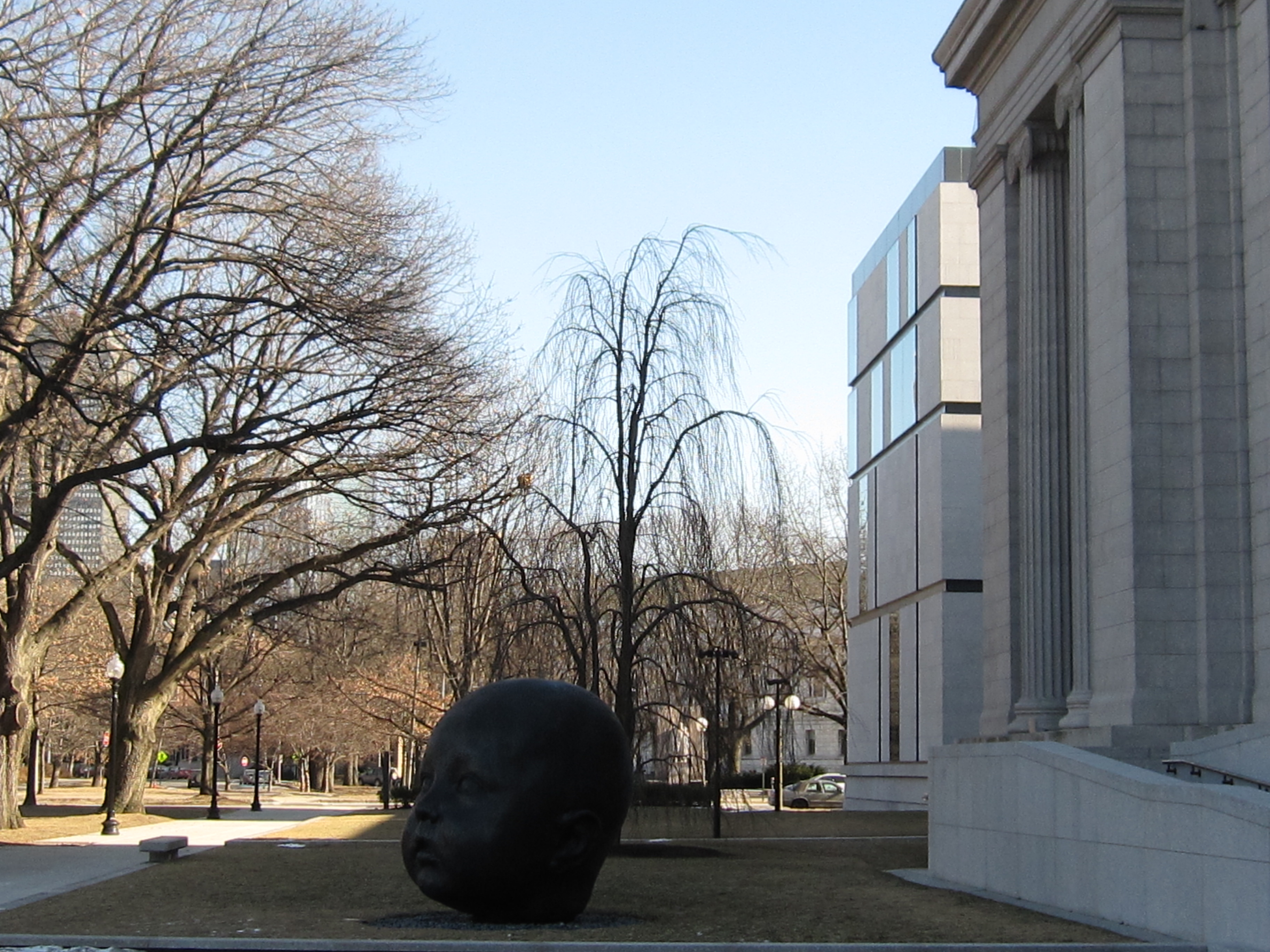
The new Art of the Americas wing is integrated with the neoclassical facade of the main building

A renovation included the new Art of the Americas Wing, featuring artwork from North, South, and Central America. In 2006, the groundbreaking ceremonies took place. The new wing and adjoining Ruth and Carl J. Shapiro Family Courtyard (a bright, cavernous interior space) were designed in a restrained, contemporary style by the London-based architectural firm Foster and Partners, under the directorship of Thomas T. Difraia and Childs Bertman Tseckares Architects (CBT). The landscape architecture firm Gustafson Guthrie Nichol redesigned the Huntington Avenue and Fenway entrances, gardens, access roads, and interior courtyards.

The wing opened on November 20, 2010, with free admission to the public. Mayor Thomas Menino declared it "Museum of Fine Arts Day", and more than 13,500 visitors attended the opening. The 12,000-square-foot (1,100 m^{2}) glass-enclosed courtyard now features a 42.5-foot (13.0 m) high glass sculpture, titled the Lime Green Icicle Tower, by Dale Chihuly. In 2014, the Art of the Americas Wing was recognized for its high architectural achievement by the award of the Harleston Parker Medal, by the Boston Society of Architects.

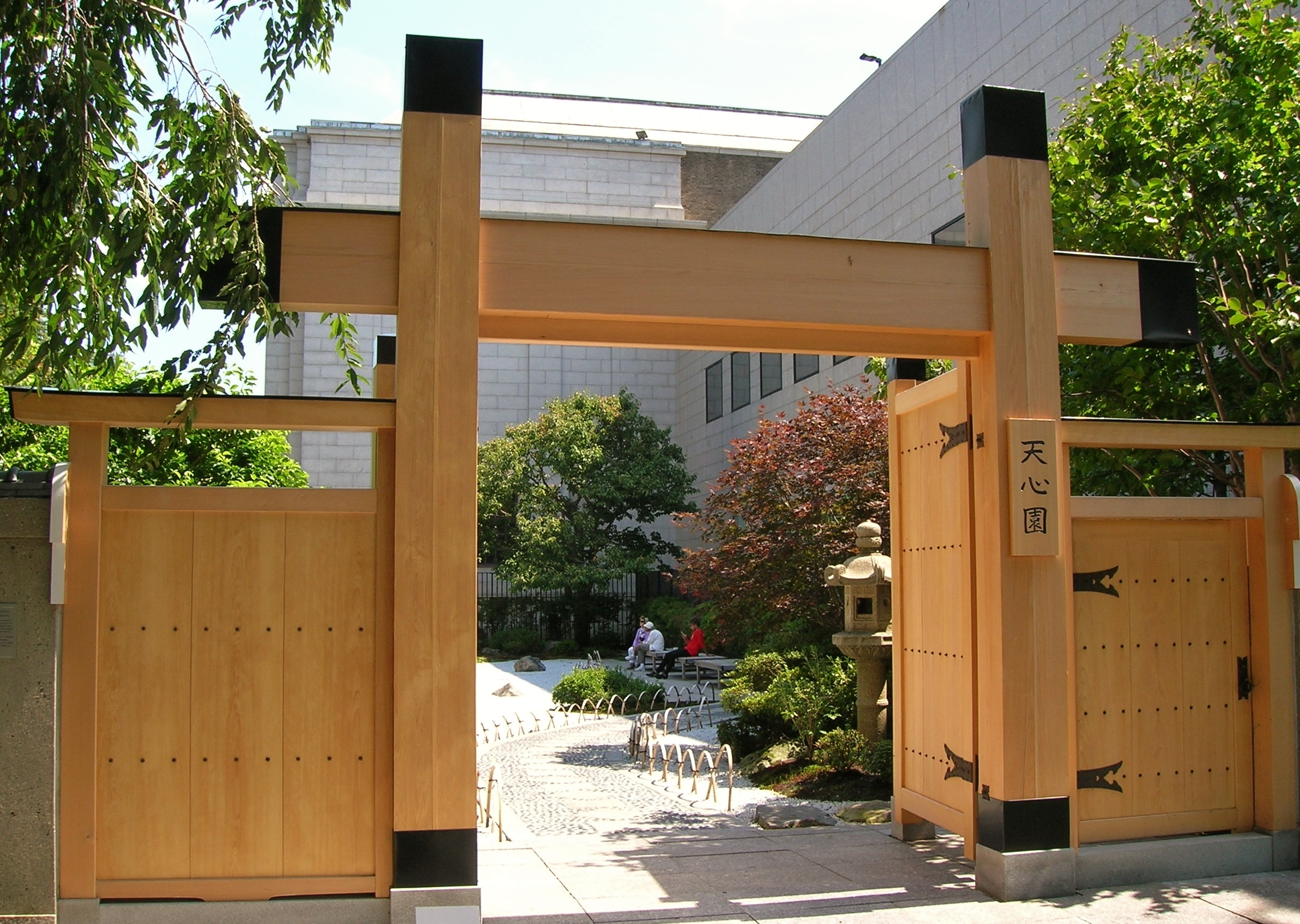
In 2015, the museum renovated Tenshin-en, its Japanese garden.

In 2015, the museum renovated its outdoors Japanese garden, Tenshin-en. The garden, which originally opened in 1988, had been designed by Japanese professor Kinsaku Nakane. The garden's kabukimon-style entrance gate was built by Chris Hall of Massachusetts, using traditional Japanese carpentry techniques. There is a plaque outside of the garden in memorial of Yuiko Hotta, a Japanese Art Research Associate who passed away in February 2019.

As a result of the COVID-19 pandemic, the museum was closed to the public from March 12, 2020, through September 25, 2020. To recover from a drop in visitor attendance correlated with the pandemic and ongoing accusations of racism, a rebranding campaign was announced in September 2022, along with claims of renewed community outreach efforts and a new logo. These changes were announced in tandem with the opening of the traveling exhibition of an official portrait of former US President Barack Obama by artist Kehinde Wiley and the accompanying portrait of former First Lady Michelle Obama by artist Amy Sherald, both on loan from the National Portrait Gallery in Washington DC.

In November 2020 a significant number of MFA employees voted to unionize due to a long history of unaddressed issues related to workplace conditions and compensation inequities. The workers unionized with the local chapter of the United Auto Workers. After over 96% of the union agreed in a vote, MFA staff went on a strike for the first time on November 17, 2021. Union representatives cited unresponsive engagement from MFA management over multiple issues including stagnant wages, job security, and workplace diversity, as the reason for the strike. The union pointed out that employee wages had been frozen for two years, and that management had so far only offered a 1.75% percent raise over the course of four years. Union representatives contrasted this with MFA director Matthew Teitelbaum's salary which, at nearly US$1 million, was almost 19 times larger than the average MFA worker.

== Collection ==
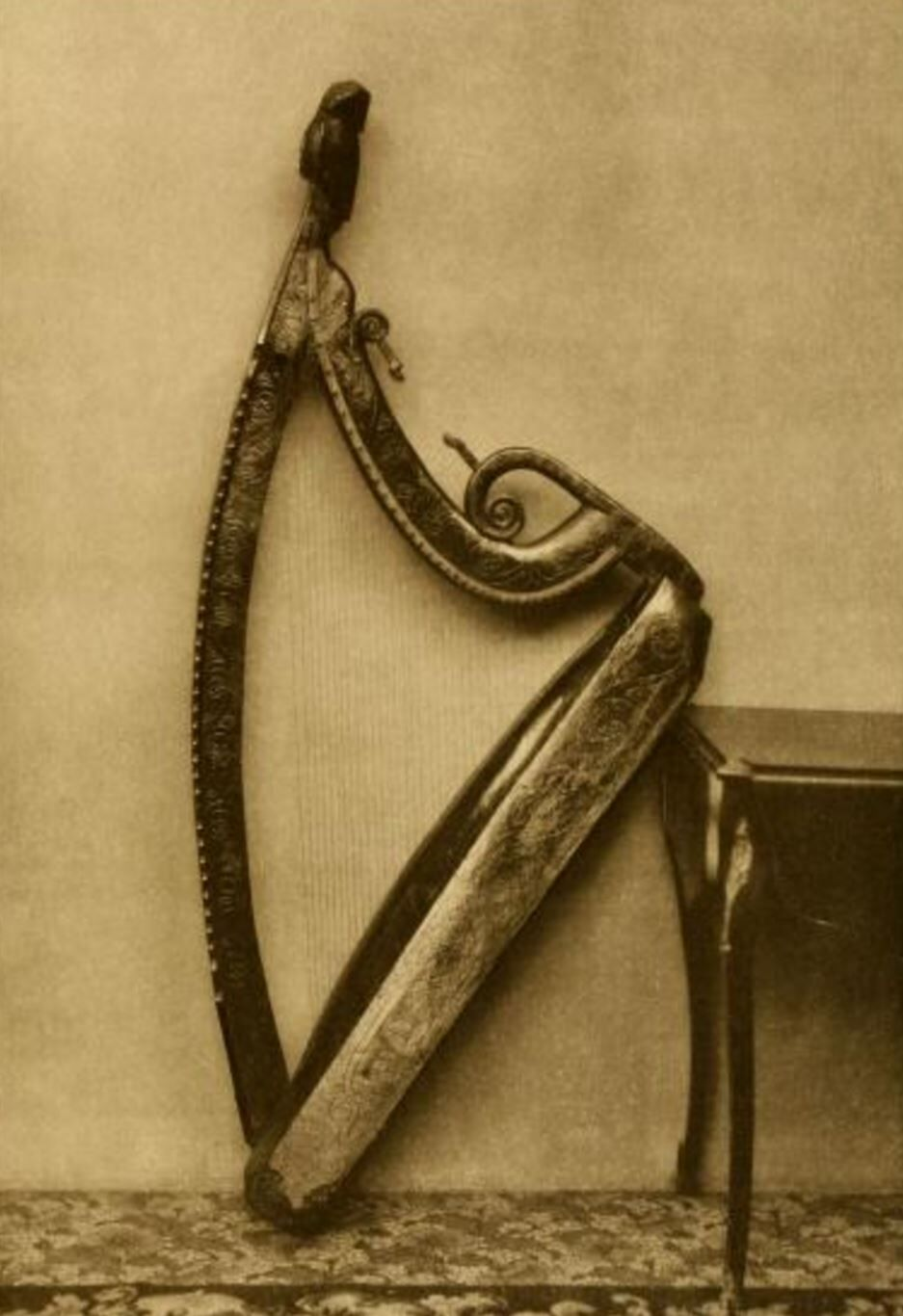
The "Bunworth harp", a large cláirseach made in 1734, is part of the collection of musical instruments

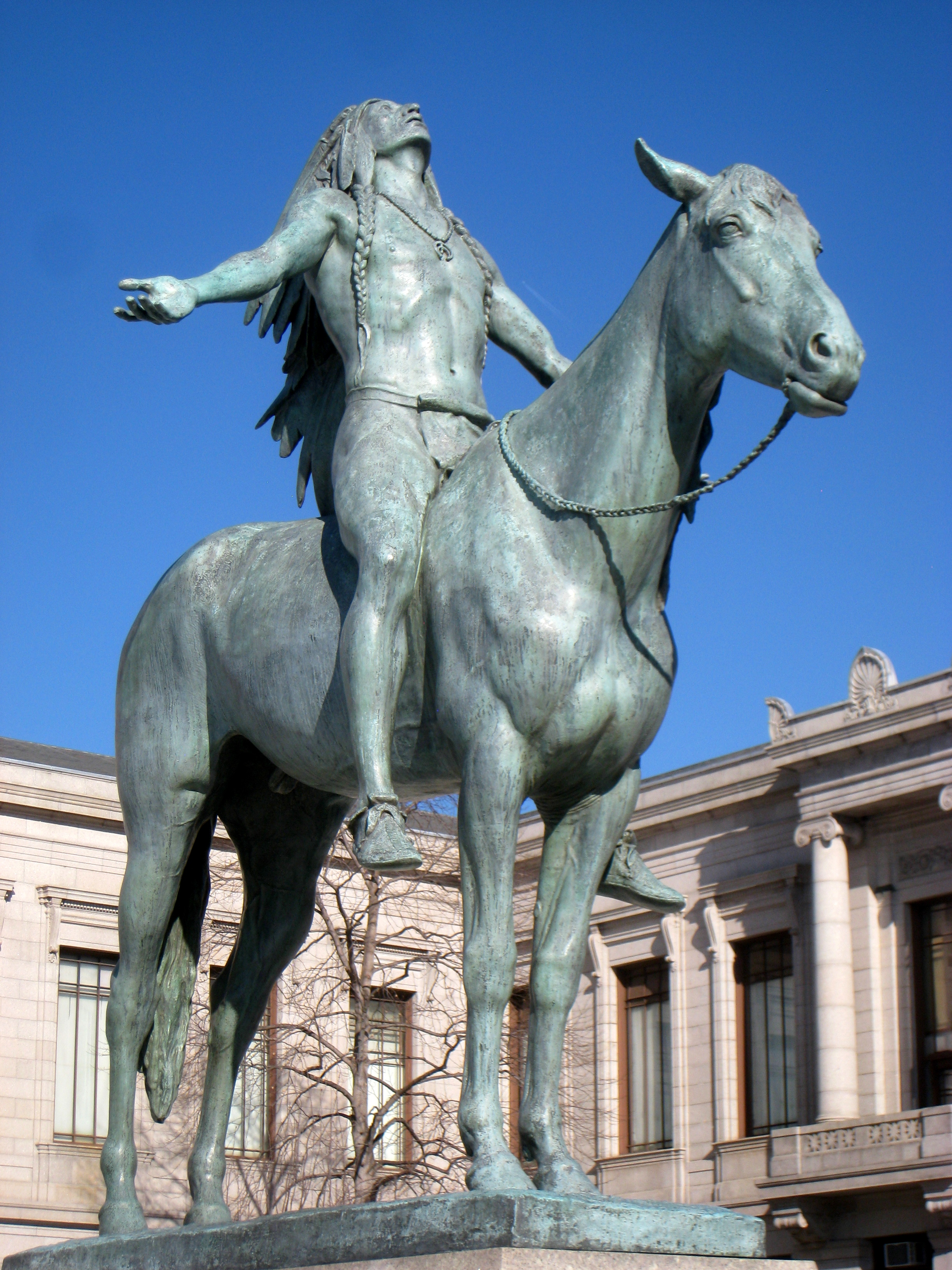
Cyrus Dallin's Appeal to the Great Spirit (1908) stands outside the museum's main entrance facing Huntington Avenue.

The Museum of Fine Arts possesses materials from a wide variety of art movements and cultures. The museum also maintains a large online database with information on over 346,000 items from its collection, accompanied with digitized images. Online search is freely available through the Internet. The museum also maintains the Conservation and Art Materials Encyclopedia Online, (CAMEO) a database that "compiles, defines, and disseminates technical information on the distinct collection of terms, materials, and techniques used in the fields of art conservation and historic preservation". CAMEO uses MediaWiki.

=== Highlights ===
Some highlights of the collection include:

- Ancient Egyptian artifacts including sculptures, sarcophagi, and jewelry dating back to approximately 6500 BCE to 600 CE, which were primarily obtained through excavations conducted by George A. Reisner in Egypt and Sudan between 1905 and 1942.
- The Nubian arts, including Kerma pottery, colossal royal statues of Napatan kings, jewels, and imports from Greece and Rome, are represented in the collection of Nubian art.
- Dutch Golden Age painting, including 113 works given in 2017 by collectors Rose-Marie and Eijk van Otterloo and Susan and Matthew Weatherbie. The gift includes works from 76 artists, as well as the Haverkamp-Begemann Library, a collection of more than 20,000 books, donated by the van Otterloos. The donors also established in 2022 a scholarly institute at the museum, the Center for Netherlandish Art, which houses the library and many of the paintings.
- French Impressionist and Post-Impressionist works by artists such as Paul Gauguin, Édouard Manet, Pierre-Auguste Renoir, Edgar Degas, Claude Monet, Camille Pissarro, Vincent van Gogh, and Paul Cézanne.
- 18th- and 19th-century American art, including many works by John Singleton Copley, Winslow Homer, John Singer Sargent, and Gilbert Stuart.
- Cyrus Dallin's 1908 statue, Appeal to the Great Spirit, is prominently exhibited on the lawn at the museum's entrance.
- The Chinese collections feature a selection of imperial ceramics, ancient bronzes, monumental Buddhist sculptures, and 20th-century and contemporary artwork, spanning nearly every era of Chinese history. The collection of Chinese paintings is particularly noteworthy, with numerous masterpieces from the Song and Yuan dynasties.
- The largest collection of Japanese artworks under one roof in the world outside Japan including an interactive "Japanese Buddhist Temple Room" exhibit in 2024.
- The Hartley Collection of almost 10,000 British illustrated books, prints and drawings from the late 19th century
- The Rothschild Collection, including over 130 objects from the Austrian branch of the Rothschild family. Donated by Bettina Burr and other heirs.
- The Rockefeller collection of Native American work.
- The Linde Family Wing for Contemporary Art includes works by Kathy Butterly, Mona Hatoum, Jenny Holzer, Karen LaMonte, Ken Price, Martin Puryear, Doris Salcedo, and Andy Warhol.
- A collection of over 1,100 historical music instruments, with selected items displayed in a dedicated music room, with occasional talks, live demonstrations, and concerts.

=== Japanese art ===
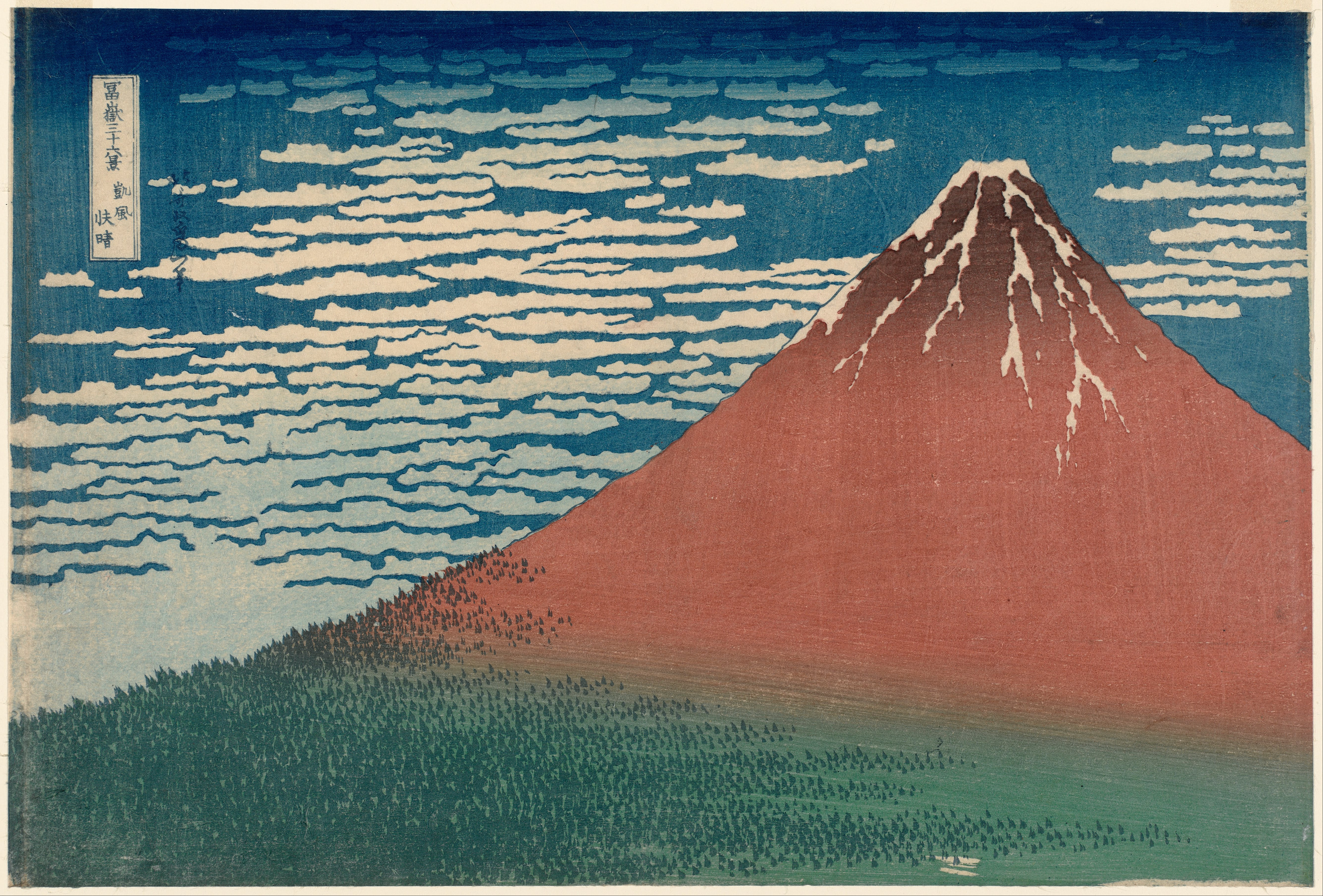
Red Fuji, from the series Thirty-six Views of Mount Fuji by Hokusai, c. 1830–1832

The collection of Japanese art at the Museum of Fine Arts is the largest in the world outside of Japan. Anne Nishimura Morse, the William and Helen Pounds Senior Curator of Japanese Art, oversees 100,000 total items that include 4,000 Japanese paintings, 5,000 ceramic pieces, and over 30,000 ukiyo-e prints.

The base of this collection was assembled in the late 19th century through the efforts of Ernest Fenollosa, Kakuzo Okakura, William Sturgis Bigelow, and Edward Sylvester Morse, each of whom had spent time in Japan and admired Japanese art. Their combined donations account for up to 75 percent of the current collection. In 1890, the Museum of Fine Arts became the first museum in the United States to establish a collection and appoint a curator specifically for Japanese art.

Another part of this collection is a number of Buddhist statues. In the later Meiji era of Japan, around the turn of the 20th century, government policy deemphasizing Buddhism in favor of Shintoism and financial pressures on temples resulted in a number of Buddhist statues being sold to private collectors. Some of these statutes came into the collection of the Museum of Fine Arts. Today, these statues are the subject of preservation and restoration efforts, which have been at times viewable by the public in special exhibits. In recent years, the museum has also collected a number of works by contemporary Japanese artists. In 2011, they acquired Zetsu no. 8 (絶), the largest work in ceramicist Jun Nishida's Zetsu (絶) series.

Also important for this collection is the exhibition of its items in Japan. From 1999 to 2018, regular exchange of items was conducted between the Museum of Fine Arts and its sister museum, the now-closed Nagoya/Boston Museum of Fine Arts. In 2012, the traveling exhibition Japanese Masterpieces from the Museum of Fine Arts, Boston visited the Japanese cities of Tokyo, Nagoya, Osaka and Fukuoka, and was well received.

In 2023 the museum held an exhibition entitled "Hokusai: Inspiration and Influence" celebrating the origins, works, and cultural impact of Japanese artist Hokusai.

=== Chinese art ===
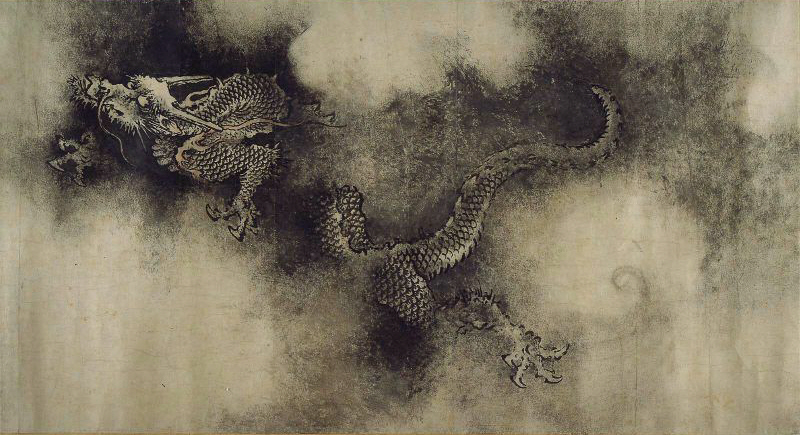
Nine Dragons (detail), Chen Rong, Chinese, Southern Song dynasty, dated 1244. Handscroll, ink and color on paper, 46.8 × 1495.6 cm. Museum of Fine Arts, Boston, Francis Gardner Curtis Fund, 17.1697.

The Chinese art collection at the Museum of Fine Arts is one of the finest outside East Asia, with particularly strong holdings in paintings, ceramics, and Buddhist sculpture. The collection includes objects from nearly every era of Chinese history, from Neolithic tomb artifacts to contemporary works.

The museum's Chinese paintings collection includes the Thirteen Emperors scroll from the Tang dynasty (618–907), considered the oldest court painting in existence, as well as Court Ladies Preparing Newly Woven Silk (early 12th century, attributed to Emperor Huizong) and Nine Dragons (first half of the 13th century, Chen Rong). The ceramics collection features important imperial stonewares and porcelain, including a rare Ru ware dish from the Northern Song dynasty, one of fewer than one hundred such pieces still extant in the world.

In 2018, the museum received the largest and most significant gift of Chinese paintings and calligraphy in its history: the Wan-go H. C. Weng Collection. Encompassing 130 paintings, 31 works of calligraphy, 18 ink rubbings, and 4 textiles, the gift spans 13 centuries and five imperial dynasties, with particularly rich representation of art from the Ming (1368–1644) and Qing (1644–1911) eras. The core of this collection was assembled in the 19th century by Weng Tonghe (1830–1904), a scholar who served as tutor to two of the last emperors of the Qing dynasty.

=== Restitution claims ===
In April 2024, the museum donated several 14th-century Buddhist Śarīra relics that were in its collection since 1939 to the Jogye Order as part of an agreement to repatriate artifacts taken from Korea during the Japanese Occupation. The relics were transferred to the Heoam Temple in Yangju, South Korea, where they are believed to have originated.

In November 2025, the museum returned two of its Benin Bronzes to Nigeria.

== Libraries ==
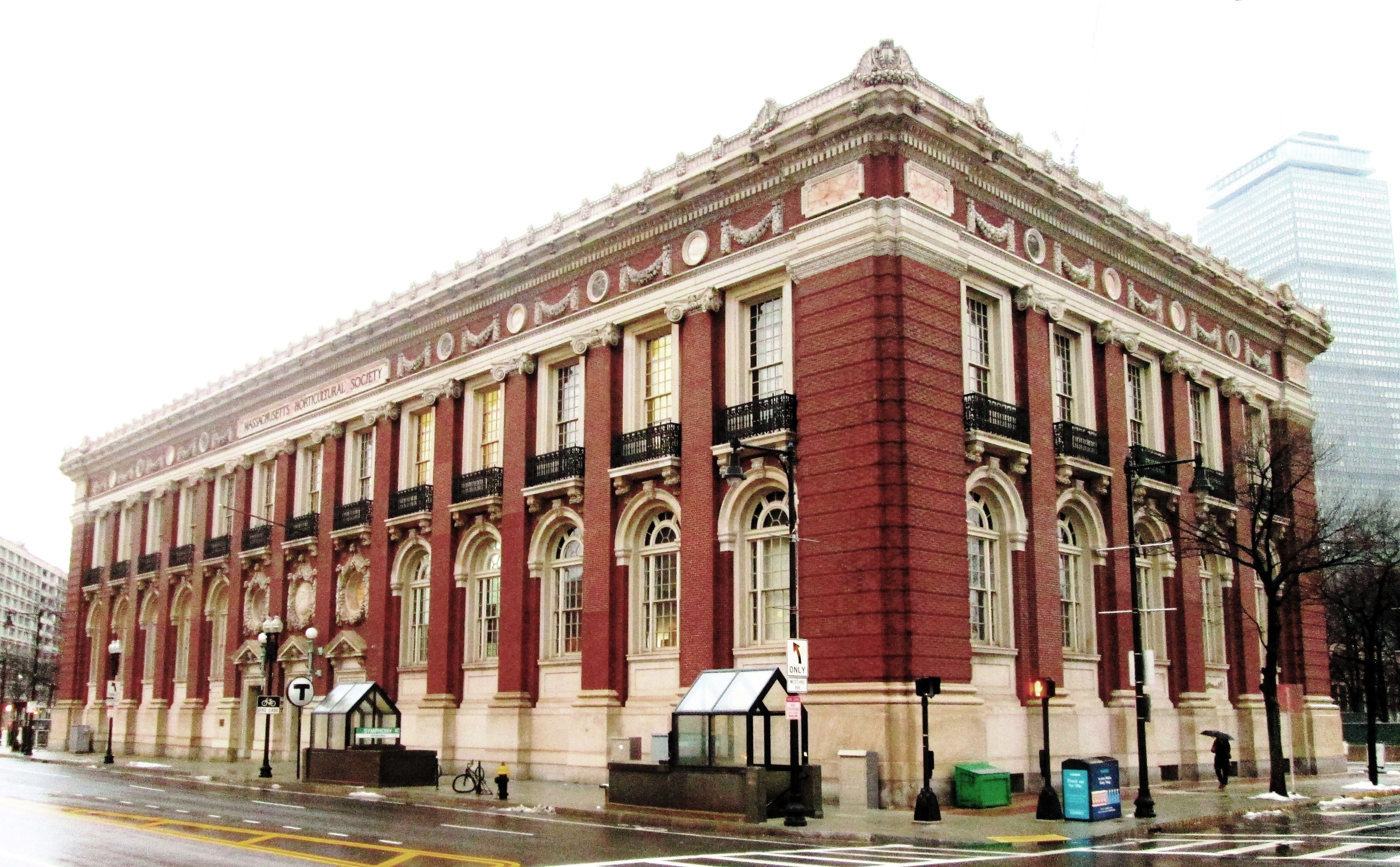
The main library was formerly located nearby on Massachusetts Avenue at Horticultural Hall.

The libraries at the Museum of Fine Arts consist of a main library, eight curatorial departmental libraries, and the Center for Netherlandish Art Library. Collectively they hold over 450,000 items, including 60,000 art auction catalogs, and 150,000 periodicals and ephemera. The main branch, the William Morris Hunt Memorial Library, is named after the noted American artist. In 2021, the main library moved after 18 years at Horticultural Hall, two stops away on the MBTA Green Line. The new entrance for the library is on the first floor of the museum, near Sharf Information Center, in front of the Nina Saunders Suite. About one-quarter of the collection was planned to be housed on the third floor of the museum, along with the book conservation facilities, with the remainder stored off-site. The main library had been open to the public, and the catalog could be searched online through the Fenway Libraries Online (FLO). It is open to researchers for two three-hour sessions per week, but only by appointment requested two weeks in advance, and subject to approval. Exhibitions organized by the library staff in coordination with the School of the Museum of Fine Arts at Tufts are held two to three times per year.

== Community relations ==
Through the Community Arts Initiative, the MFA partners with community organizations (12 total in 2026) and an artist selected each year through an open call, to spend a school year introducing young people to art-making processes and the MFA's collection. Through a stipend, the "Lead Artist," or artist in residence, guides students on a collaborative project culminating in an exhibition of student work at the Museum, specifically in the Linde Gallery (168) in the Linde Family Wing for Contemporary Art. Selected Lead Artists include Szu Chieh-Yun (b. 1988), Timothy Hyunsoo Lee (b. 1990), Alexandra Adamo, Perla Mabel, Chanel Thervil, Sneha Shrestha, Rhonda Weppler, Julie Martini, and Maria Molteni.

The MFA is accessible to visually, audibly, or physically impaired visitors. Special programming and tours are available for blind, ASL-fluent, cognitively-impaired, autistic, and medically assisted guests. In the spring of 2019, the MFA installed new non-discriminatory restroom signs. As of 2026, multiple-stall restrooms feature either a "Self-identified Women" or "Self-identified Men" label, while single-occupancy restrooms, such as those by the Gund gallery are labeled "Everyone".

The MFA publicly apologized on May 24, 2019, after a field trip by Helen Y. Davis Leadership Academy Charter Public School (Dorchester, MA, closed in 2024) Students aged 12 and 13 of Black and other minority backgrounds who were visiting the museum as a reward for high achievement said they were racially insulted there.According to a teacher, an MFA employee quipped: "No food, no drink, and no watermelon," possibly referring to the anti-Black racist trope of the Watermelon Stereotype. A museum spokesperson said the employee in question was misheard and had actually stated, "No water bottles." The MFA conceded that there was no way to definitively prove what was said. The museum said staff dealing with school groups would be retrained. After examining video footage, two of museum patrons received cease-and-desist orders and had their memberships revoked.

In 2019 the MFA debuted its newly renamed "Indigenous Peoples' Day" (formerly Columbus Day) celebrations, with a focus on Native American art and culture. The events included special displays related to Cyrus Dallin's 1908 Appeal to the Great Spirit, a popular and sometimes controversial sculpture of a Native American warrior located in front of the Huntington Avenue main entrance since 1912. Community comments and feedback concerning the monumental artwork were solicited and displayed. Earlier, in March 2019, the MFA had held a special public symposium to discuss the historical background and present-day significance of the sculpture.

In 2020 the MFA had planned to offer 11 annual Community Celebrations, featuring free admission for all visitors, and special events such as dance performances, music, tours, craft demonstrations, and hands-on art making. This series included day-long Martin Luther King Jr. Day, Lunar New Year, Memorial Day, Highland Street Foundation Free Fun Friday, and Indigenous Peoples' Day celebrations. In addition, on Wednesday evenings, which were already free from 4pm to 10pm, special celebrations of Nowruz, Juneteenth, Latinx Heritage Night, ASL Night, Diwali, and Hanukkah were featured.

To commemorate its 150th anniversary, the MFA offered a free one-year family membership to anyone who attended one of its special Community Celebrations or MFA Late Nite programs during 2020. This "First Year Free Membership" program was available to anyone who had not previously been a member of the museum. The 150th year exhibitions included major shows and events featuring art by women and minority artists.

== Special exhibitions ==
The Museum of Fine Arts, Boston, hosts special exhibitions consisting of items borrowed from other museums. These limited time events extend for several months and there are typically three exhibitions taking place concurrently since at least 1996. The collection topics of the special exhibits are divided into 13 categories: Africa and Oceania; Americas; Ancient Egypt, Nubia and the near East; Ancient Greece and Rome; Asia; Contemporary Art; Europe; Jewelry; Judaica; Musical Instruments; Photography; Prints and Drawings; and Textile and Fashion Arts. Most special exhibitions take place at the following galleries: Edward and Nancy Roberts Family Gallery, Linde Family Wing for Contemporary Art, Ann and Graham Gund Gallery, Edward H. Linde Gallery. The exhibitions are usually open to public with a variety of ticket prices. Members of MFA, Boston can also enjoy free admission to any special exhibitions.

=== Philip Guston Now ===
Philip Guston Now is an exhibition organized by the Museum of Fine Arts, Boston; the National Gallery of Art, Washington; the Museum of Fine Arts, Houston; and Tate Modern, London. This show is also considered as America's most controversial art exhibition, as of May 2022. Its controversies are mainly due to much of his work addressing and confronting topics such as white supremacy, racism, anti-Semitism, and violence It was originally planned to open in June 2020, but due to nationwide protests for racial equality, it was postponed to open at May. 1, 2022. The museums were aware of its controversies, so they opened a comment area on their official website for the public to share their thoughts with the museum.

== Highlights ==
Among the many notable works in the collection, the following examples are in the public domain and have photographs available:

=== American ===
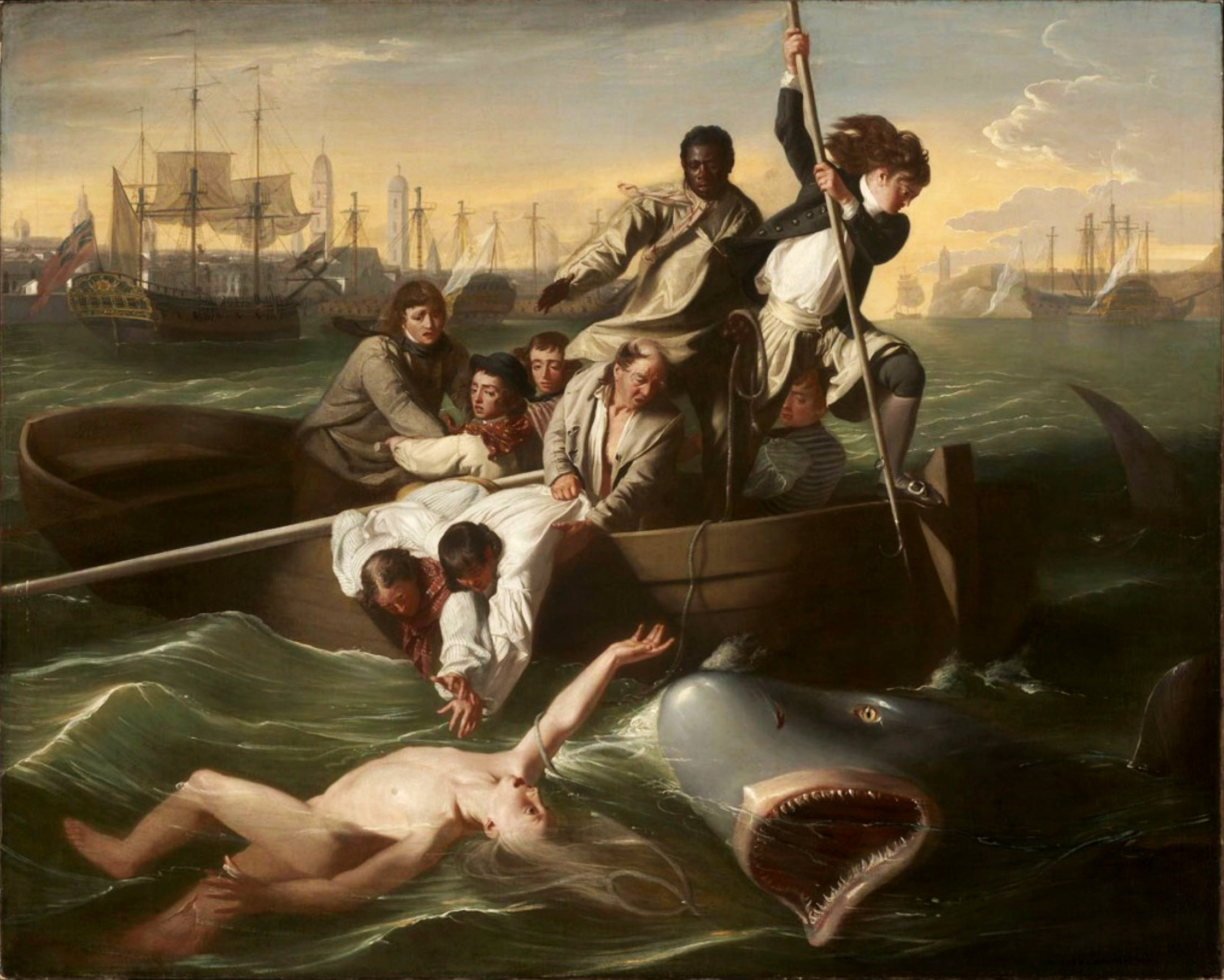
John Singleton Copley, Watson and the Shark, 1778

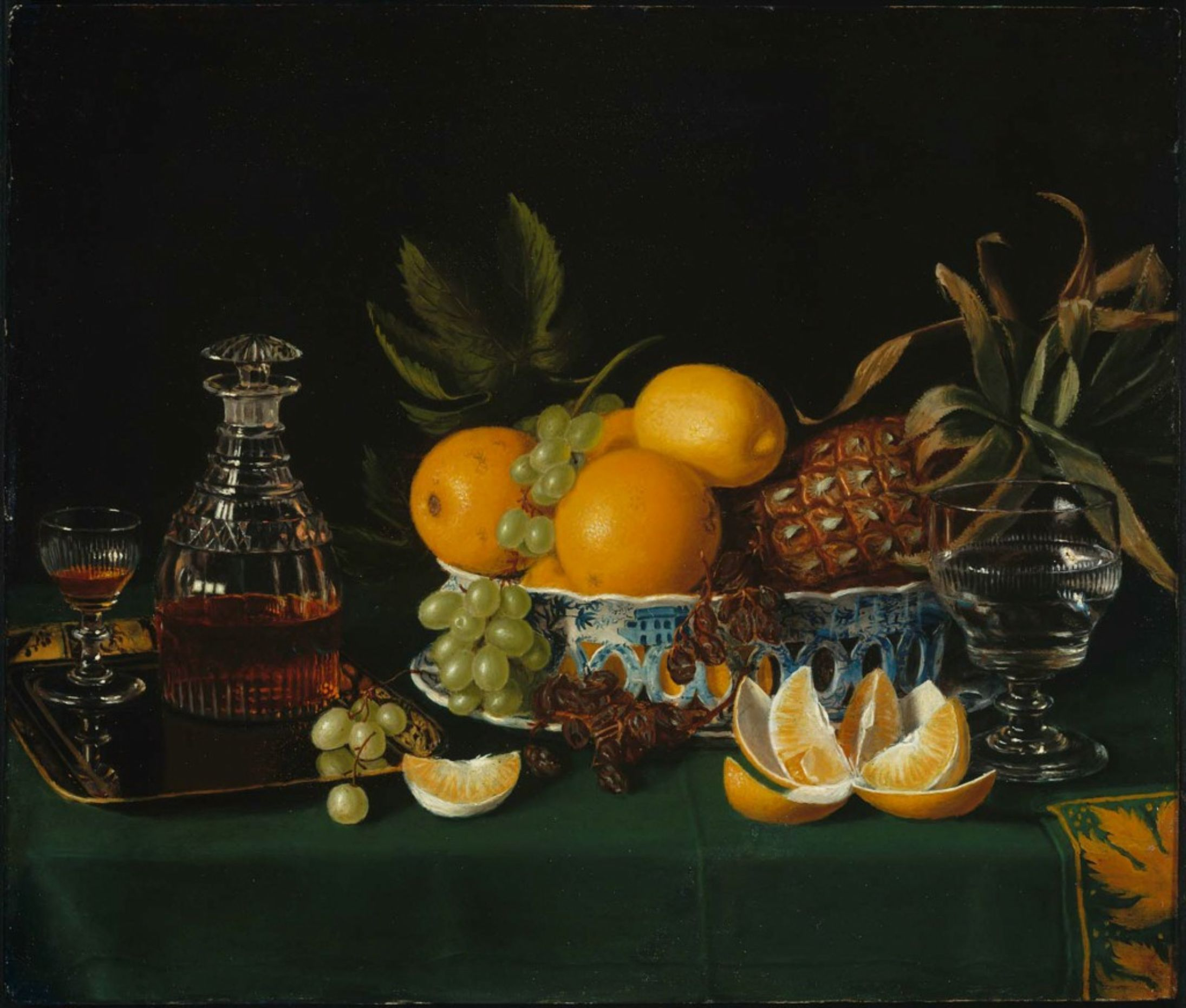
Charles Bird King, Still Life on a Green Table Cloth, 1815

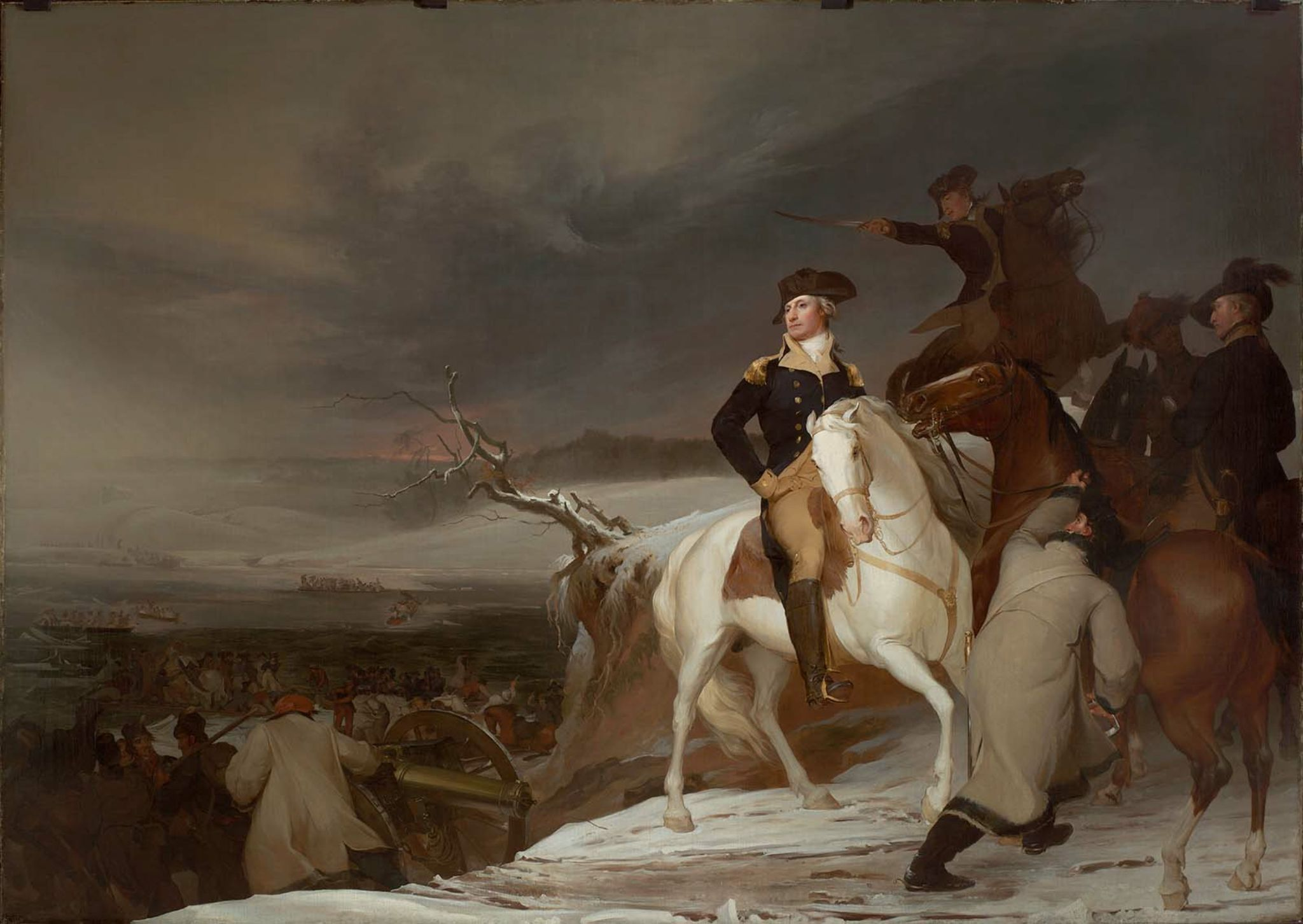
Thomas Sully, The Passage of the Delaware, 1819

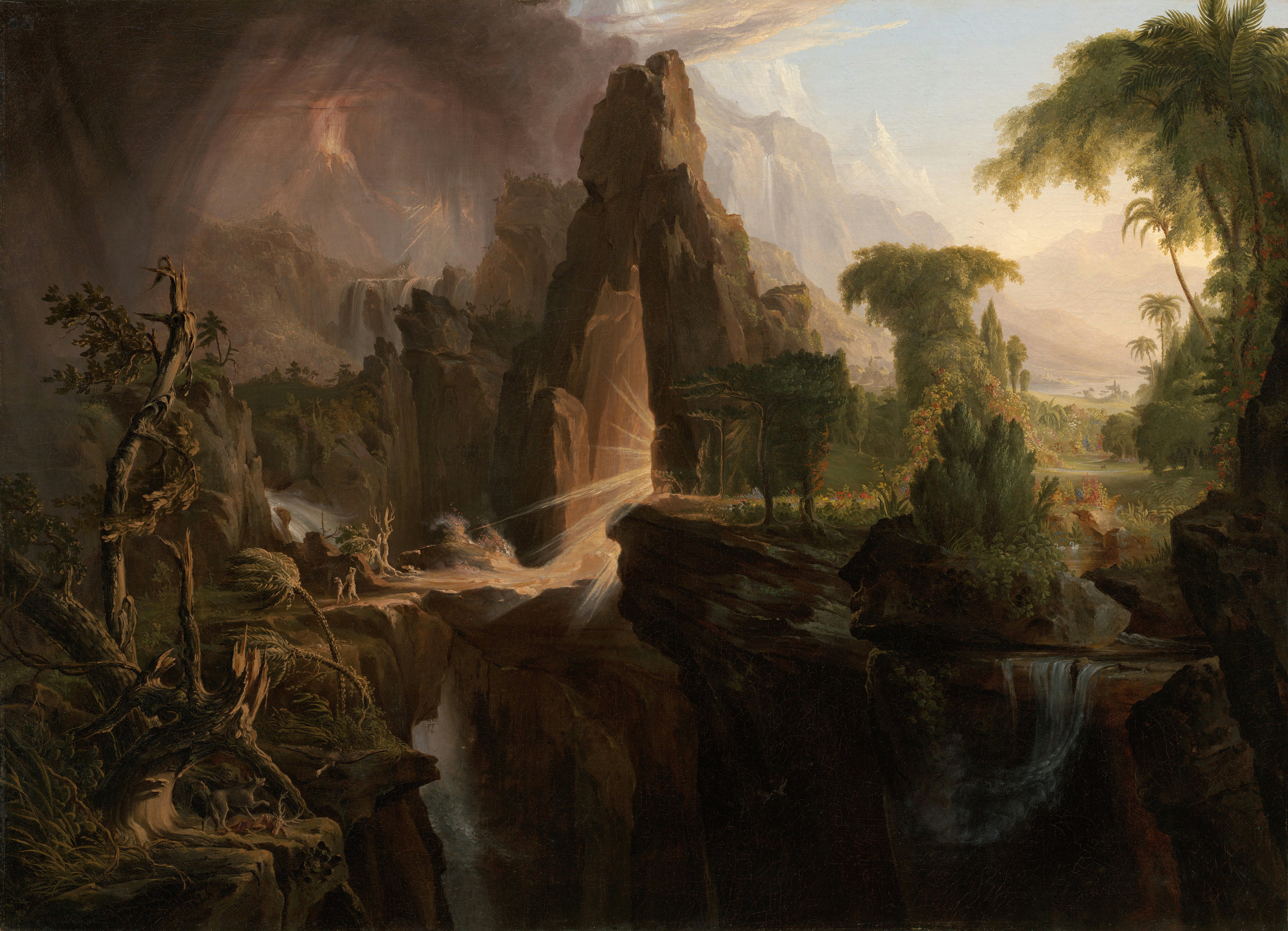
Thomas Cole, Expulsion from the Garden of Eden, 1828.

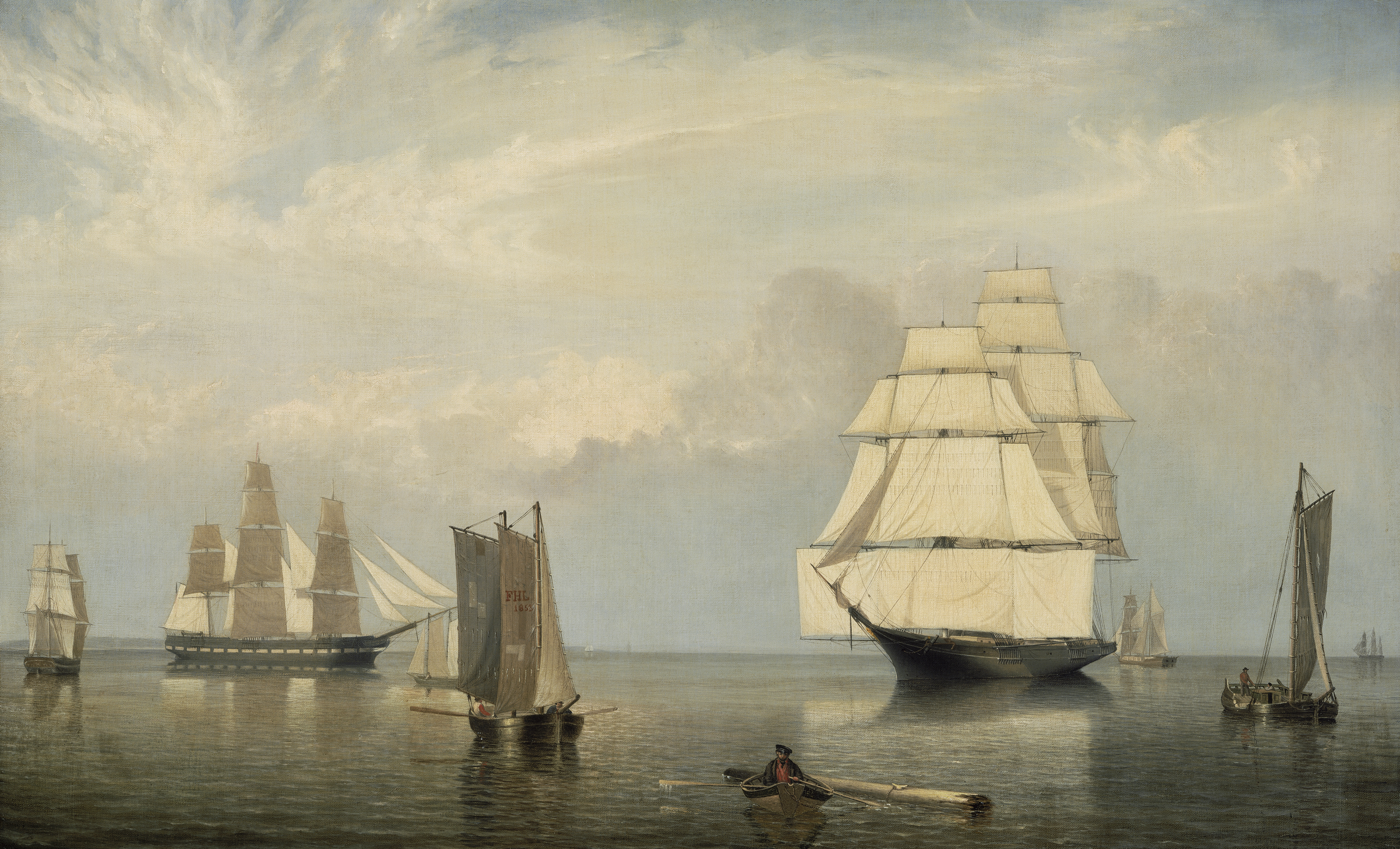
Fitz Henry Lane, Salem Harbor, 1853

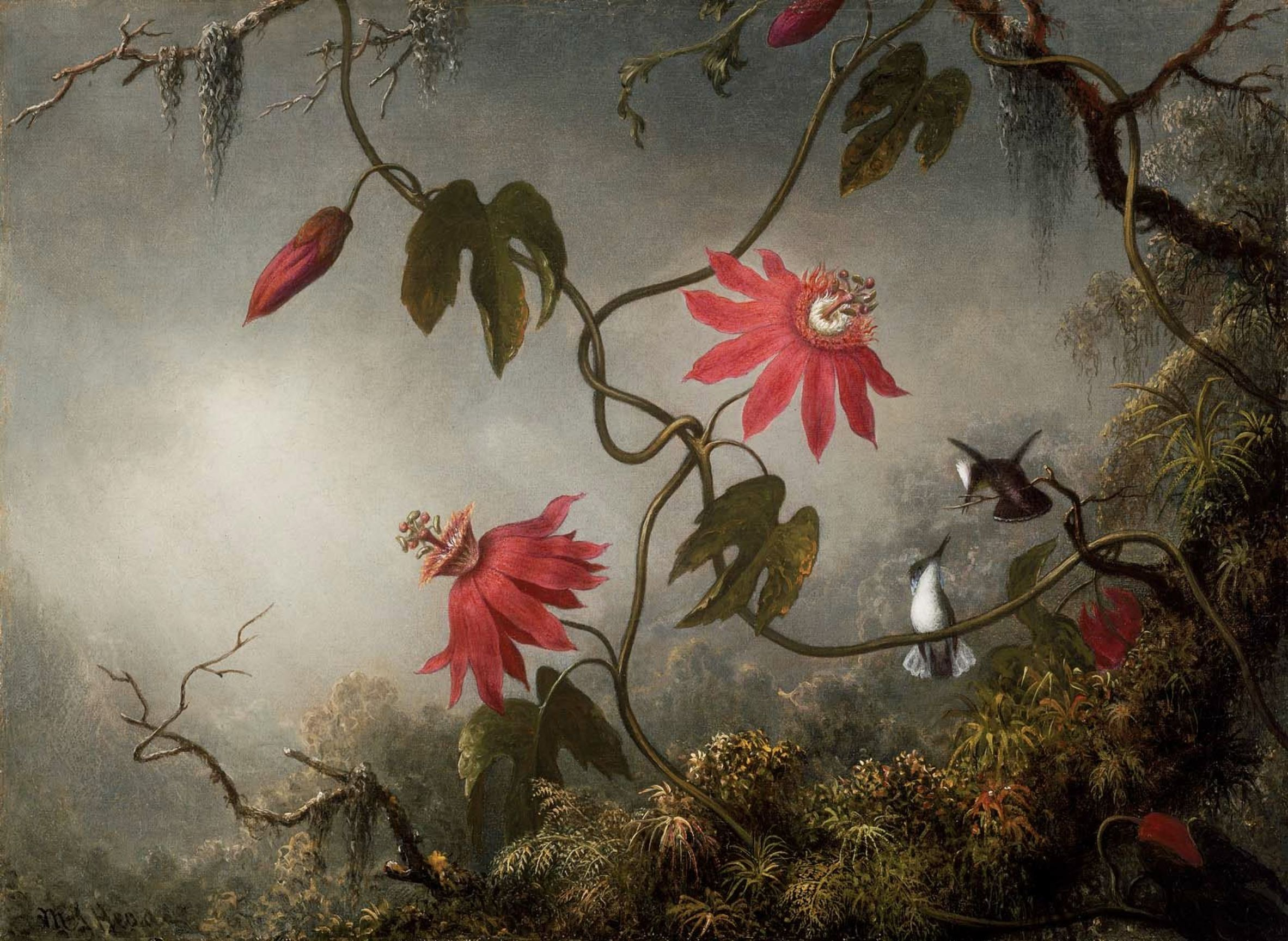
Martin Johnson Heade, Passion Flowers and Hummingbirds, c. 1870–1873

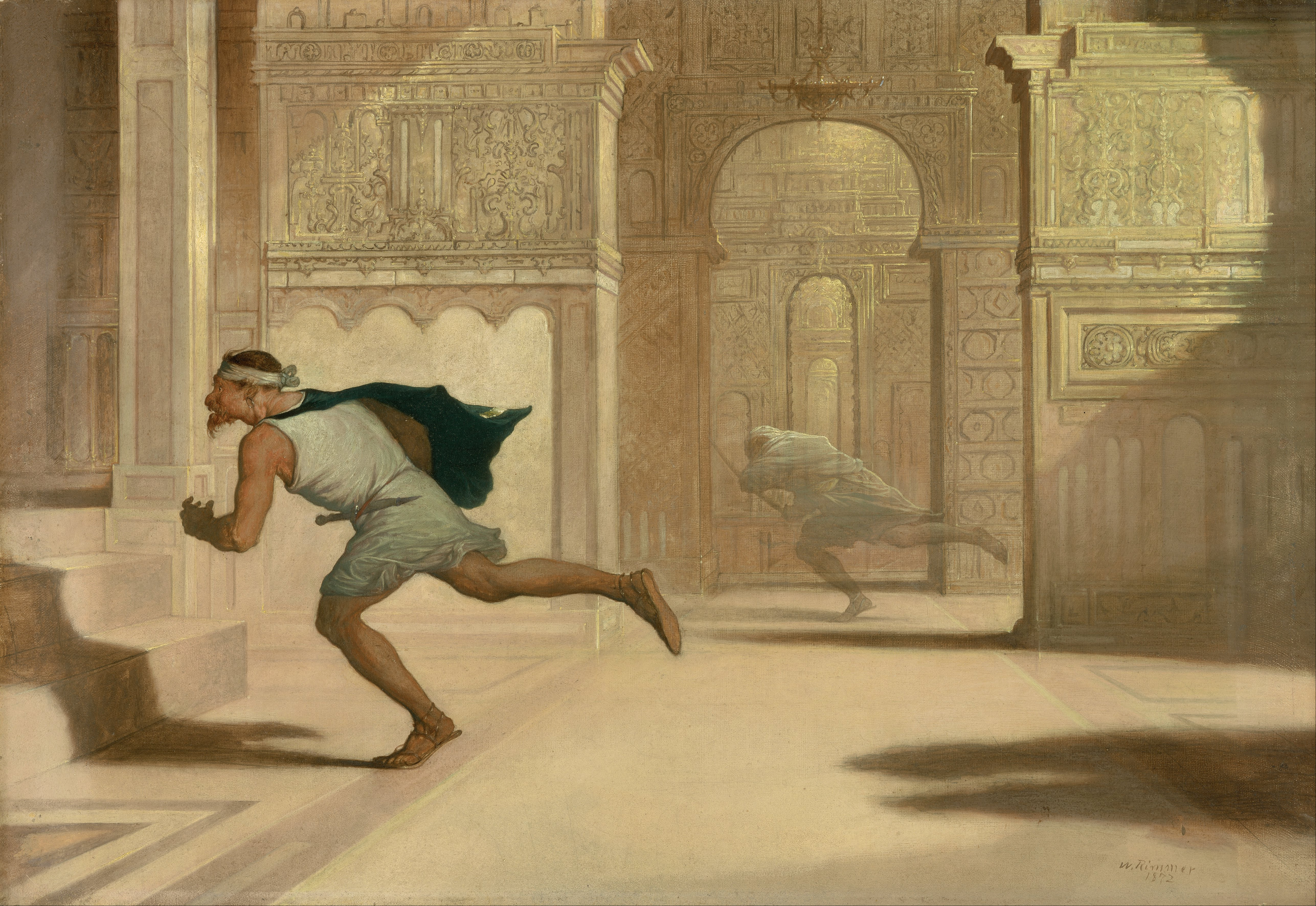
William Rimmer, Flight and Pursuit, 1872

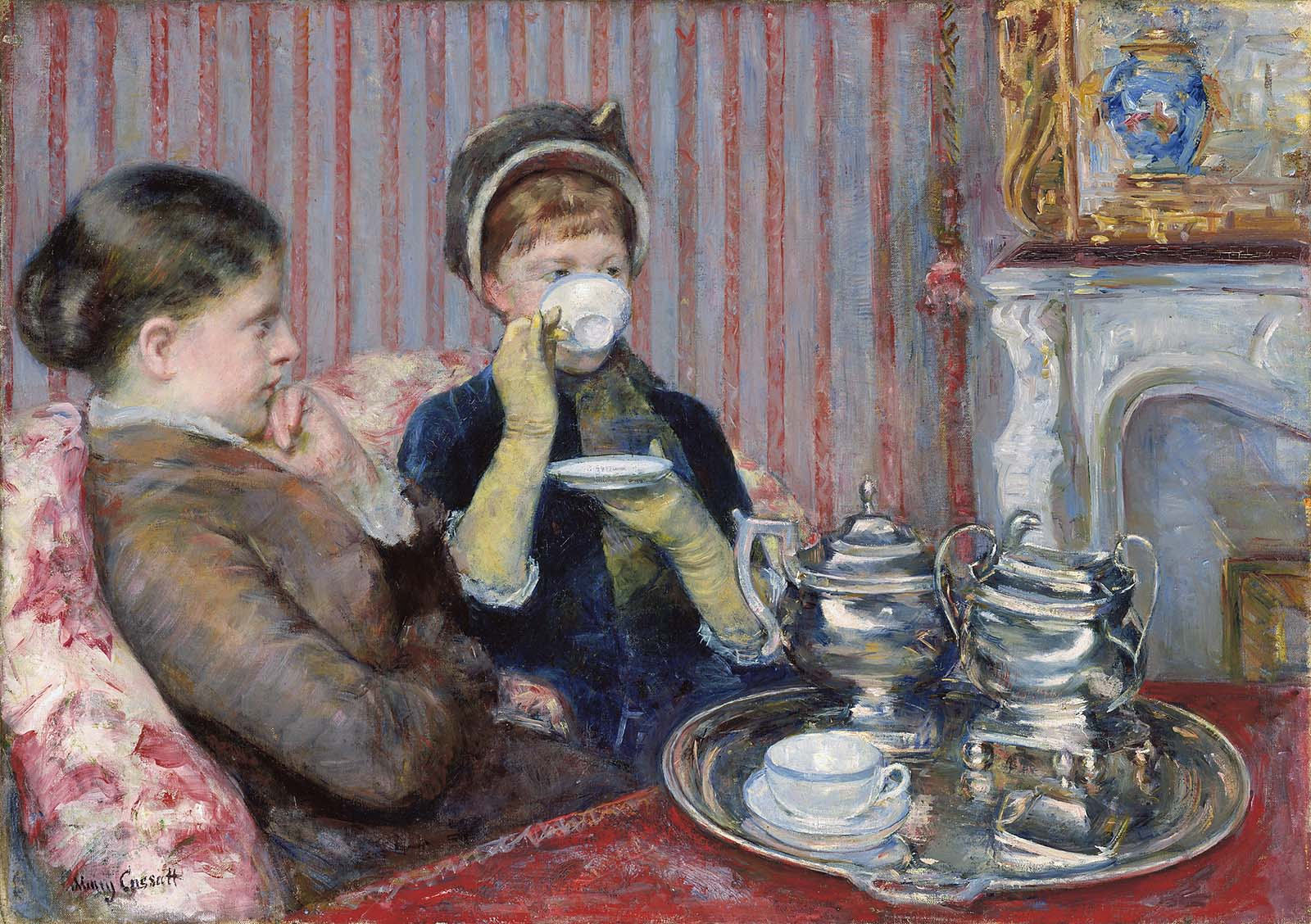
Mary Cassatt, Tea, 1880

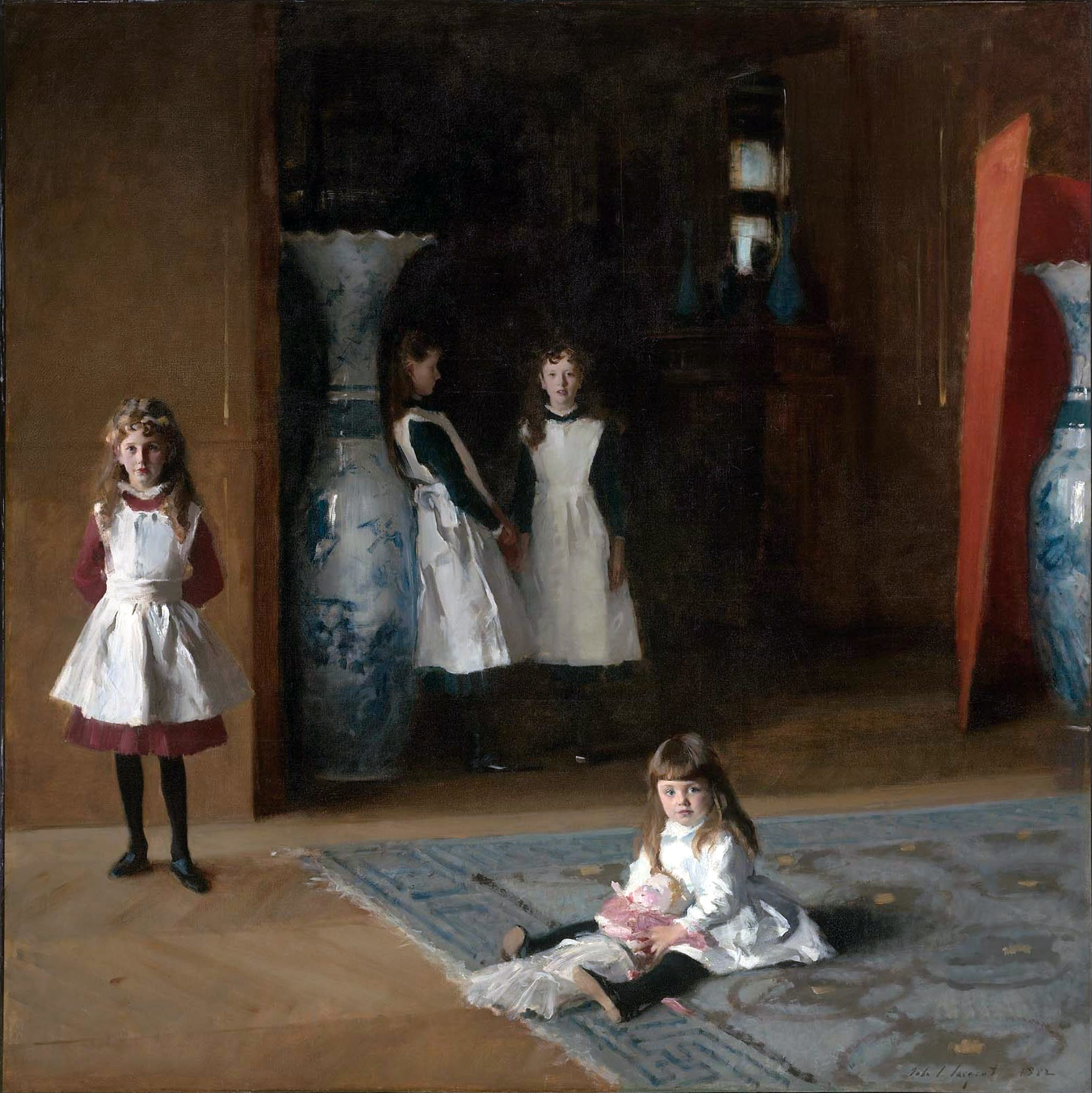
John Singer Sargent, The Daughters of Edward Darley Boit, 1882

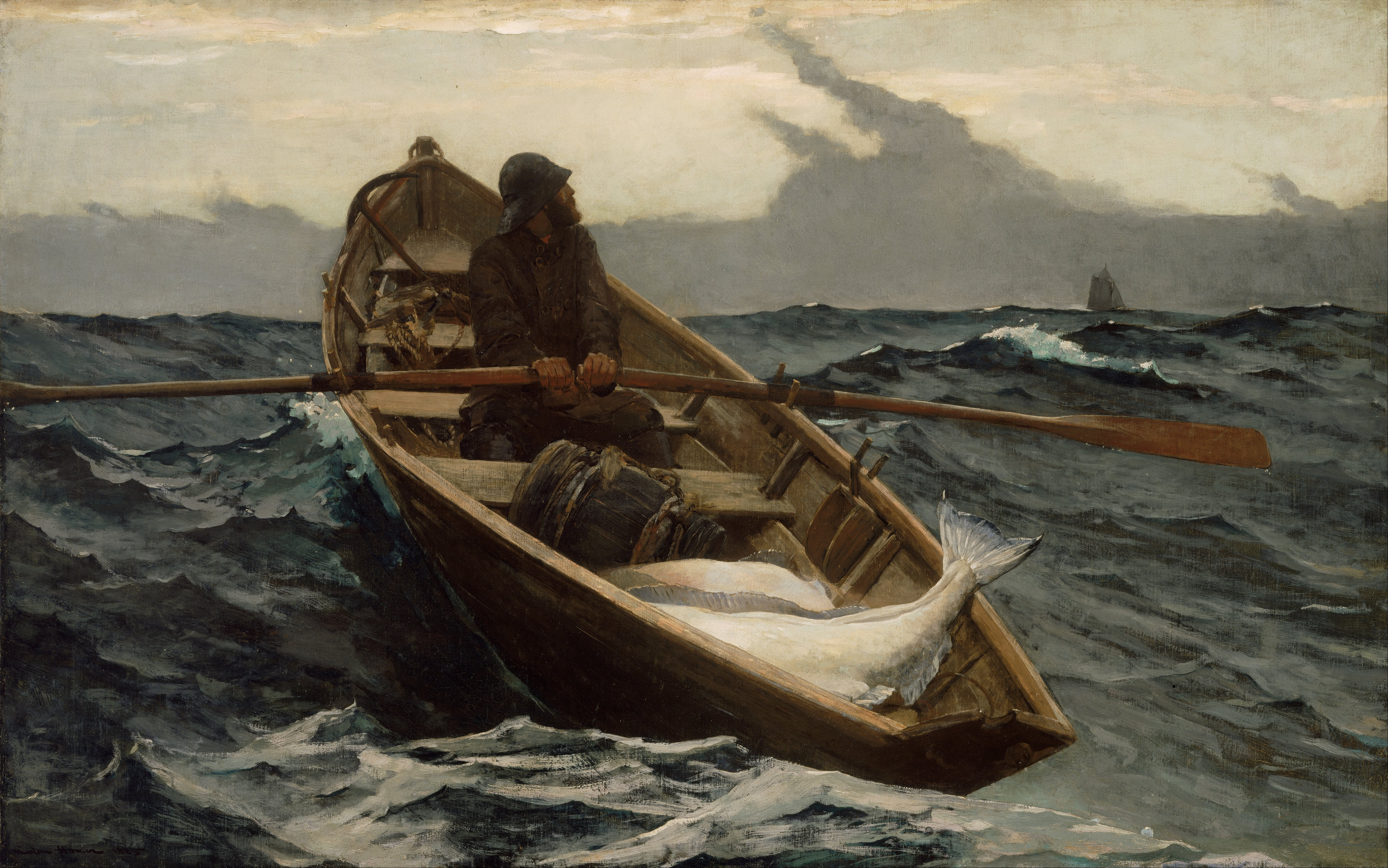
Winslow Homer, The Fog Warning, 1885

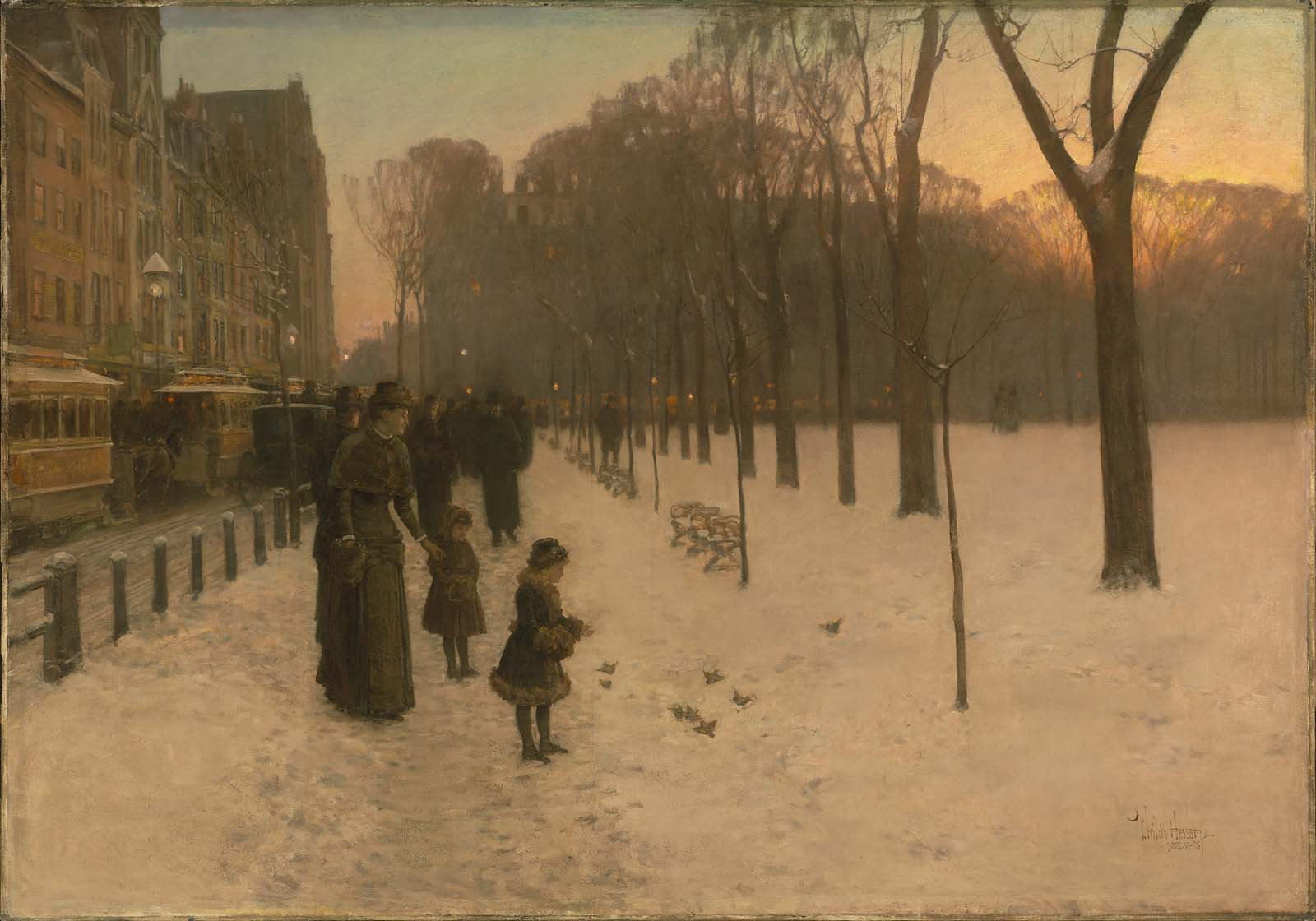
Childe Hassam, At Dusk (Boston Common at Twilight), 1886
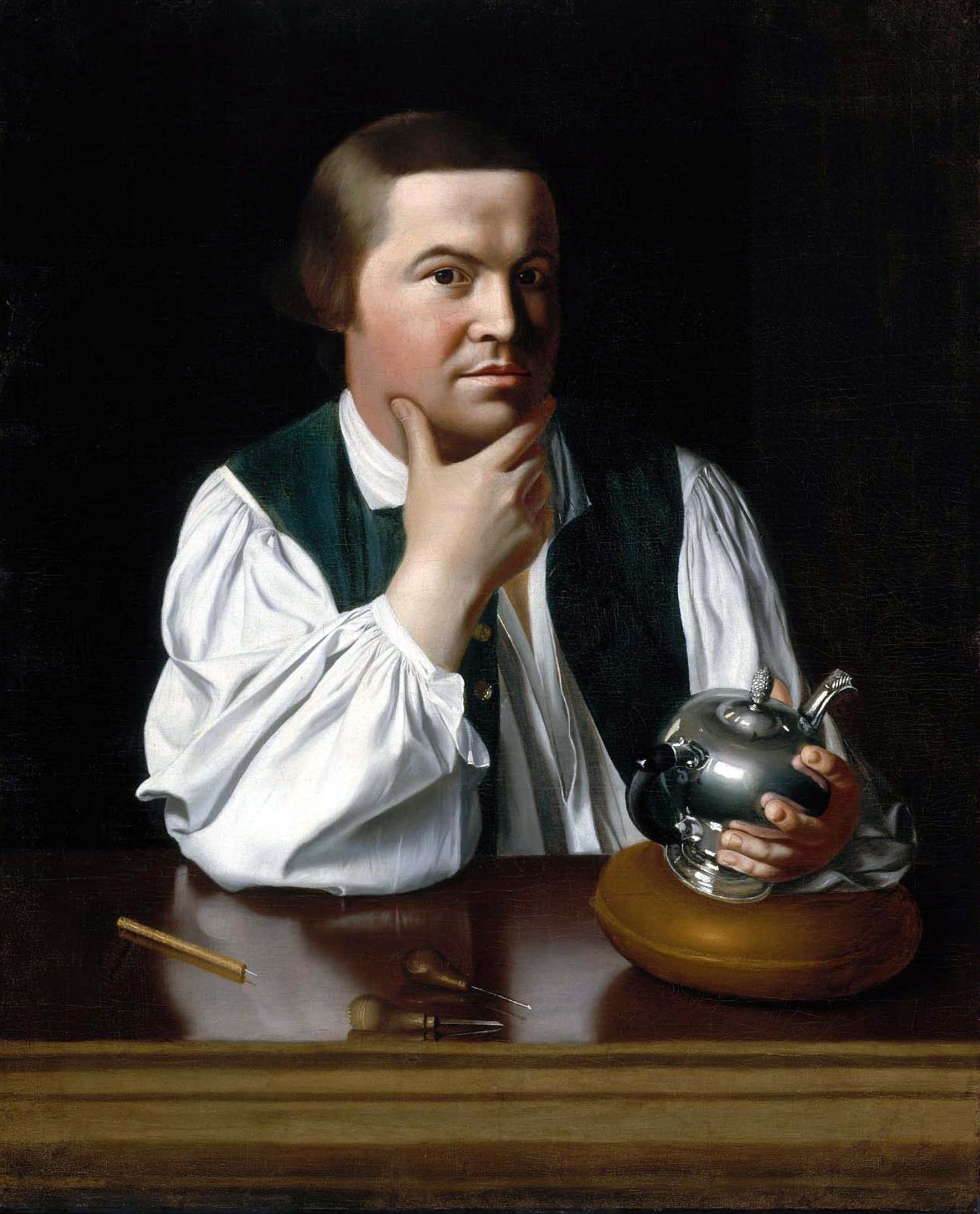
John Singleton Copley, Paul Revere, 1768

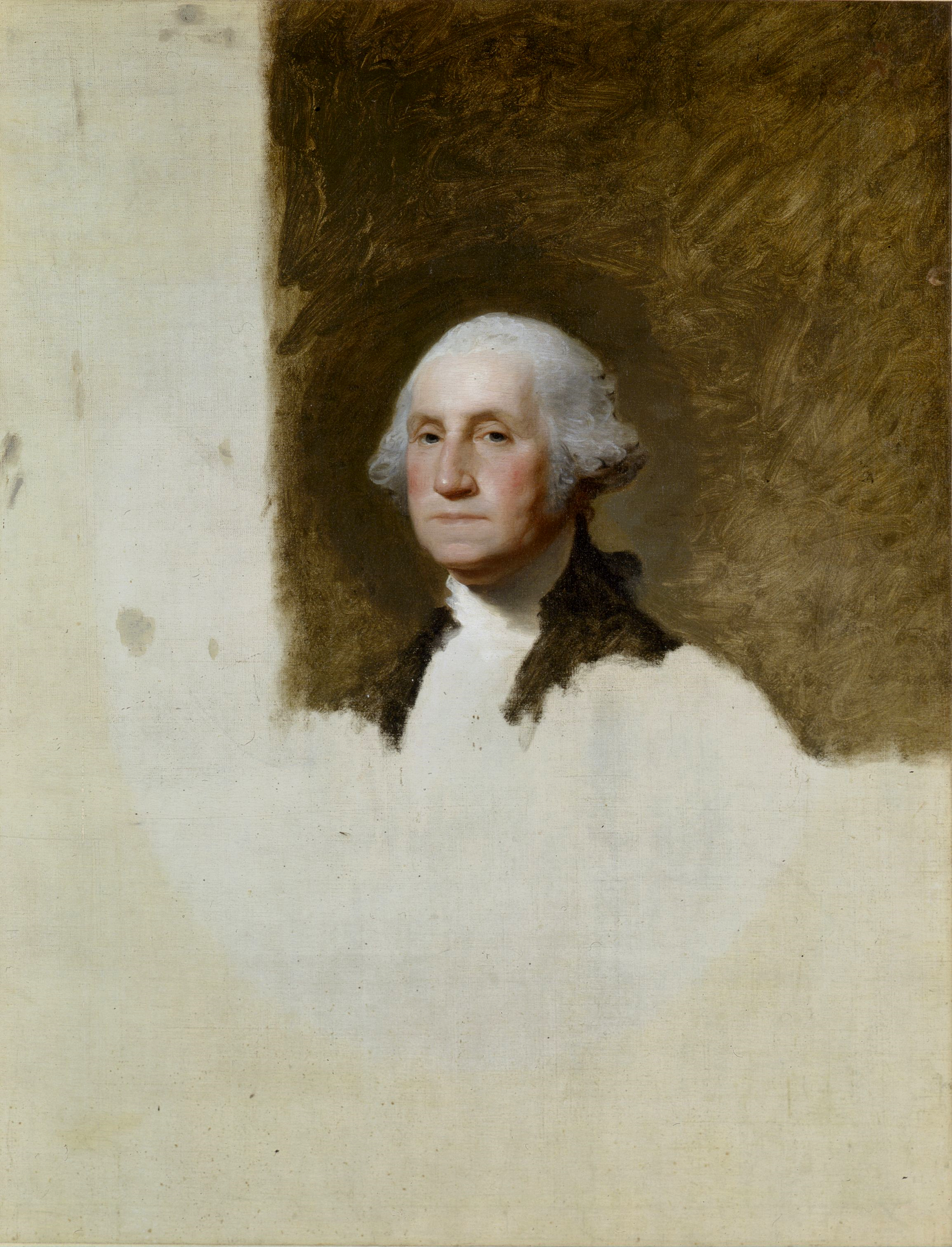
Gilbert Stuart, George Washington, 1796

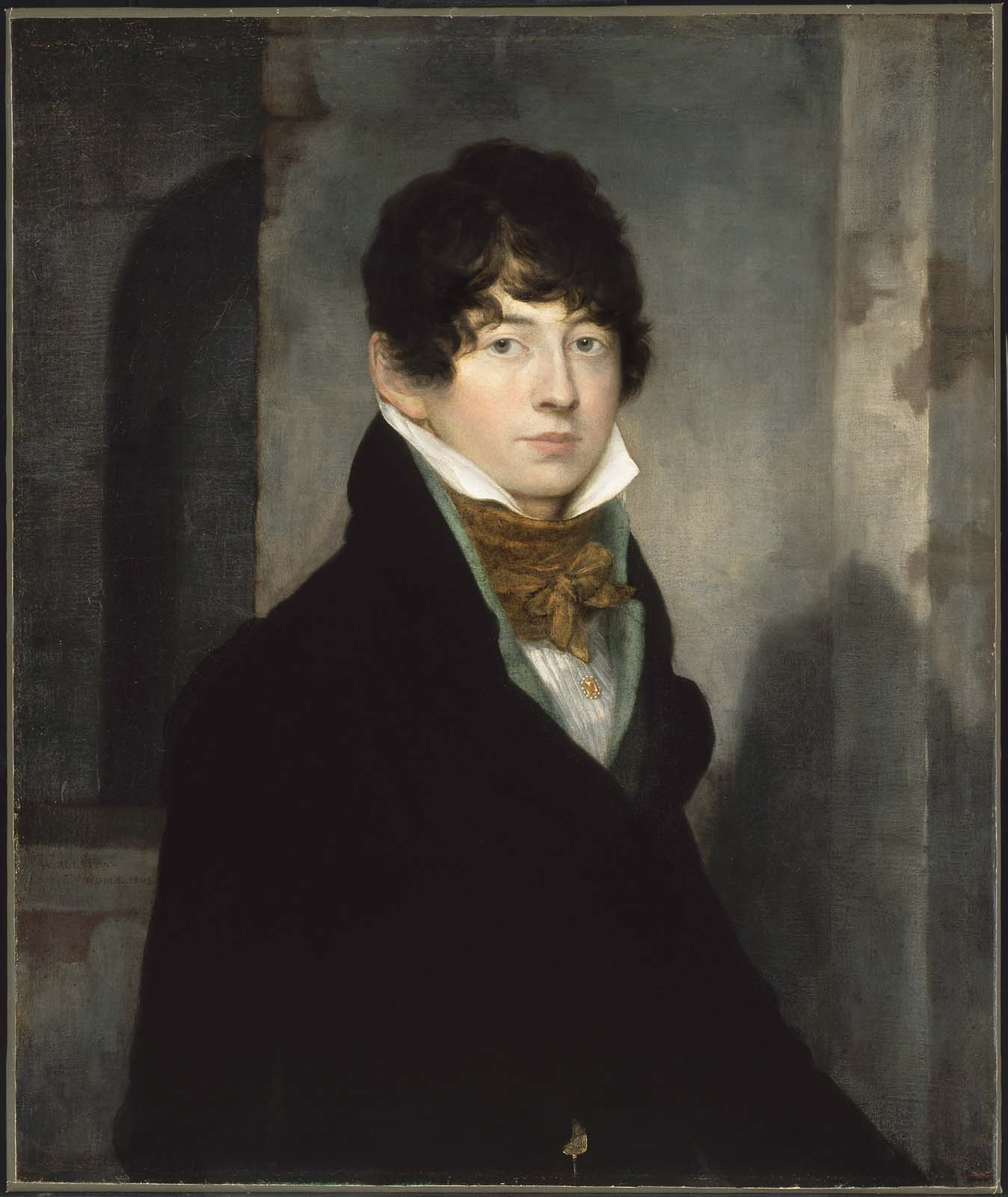
Washington Allston, Self-Portrait, 1805

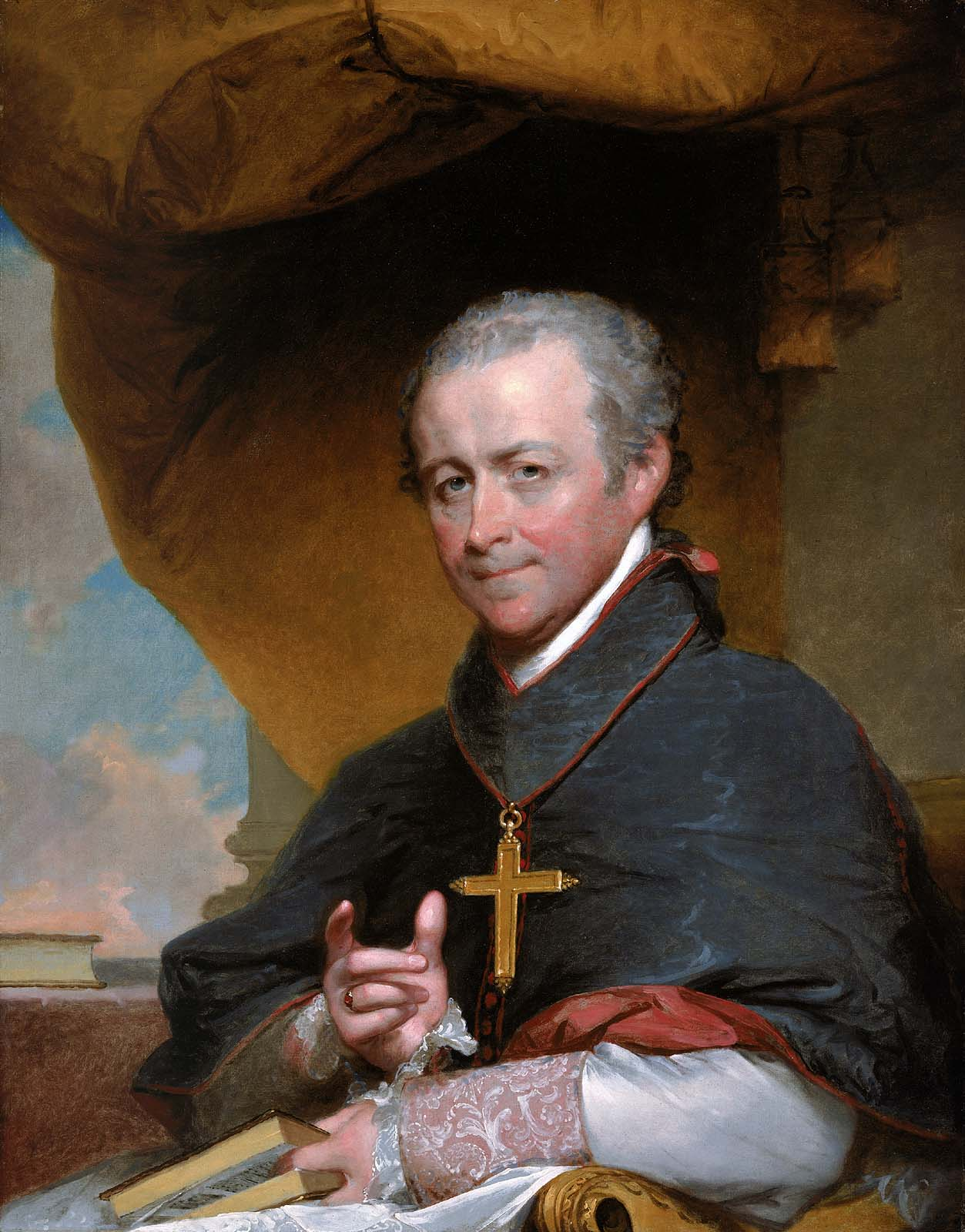
Gilbert Stuart, Portrait of Jean-Louis Lefebvre de Cheverus, 1823

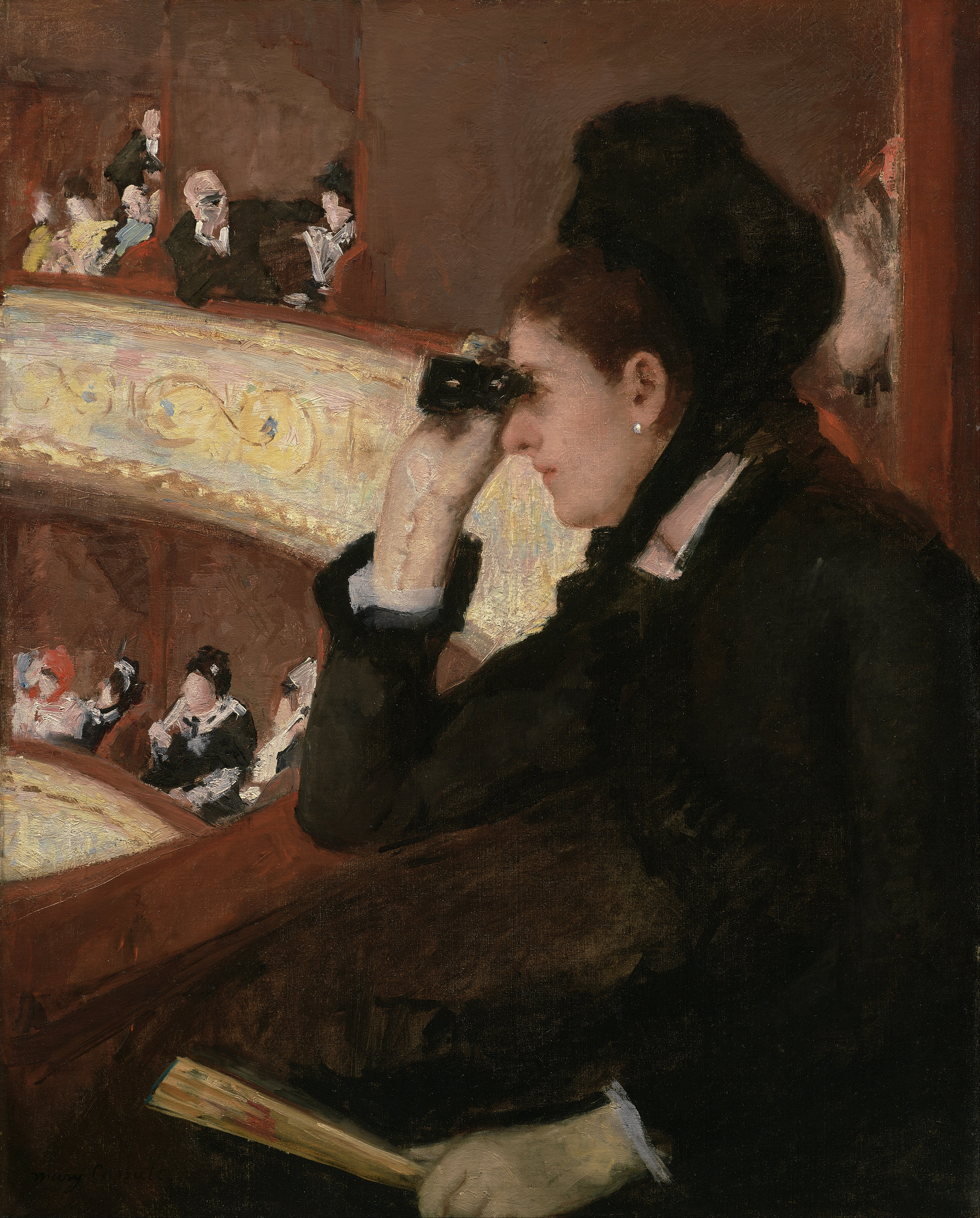
Mary Cassatt, In the Loge, 1878

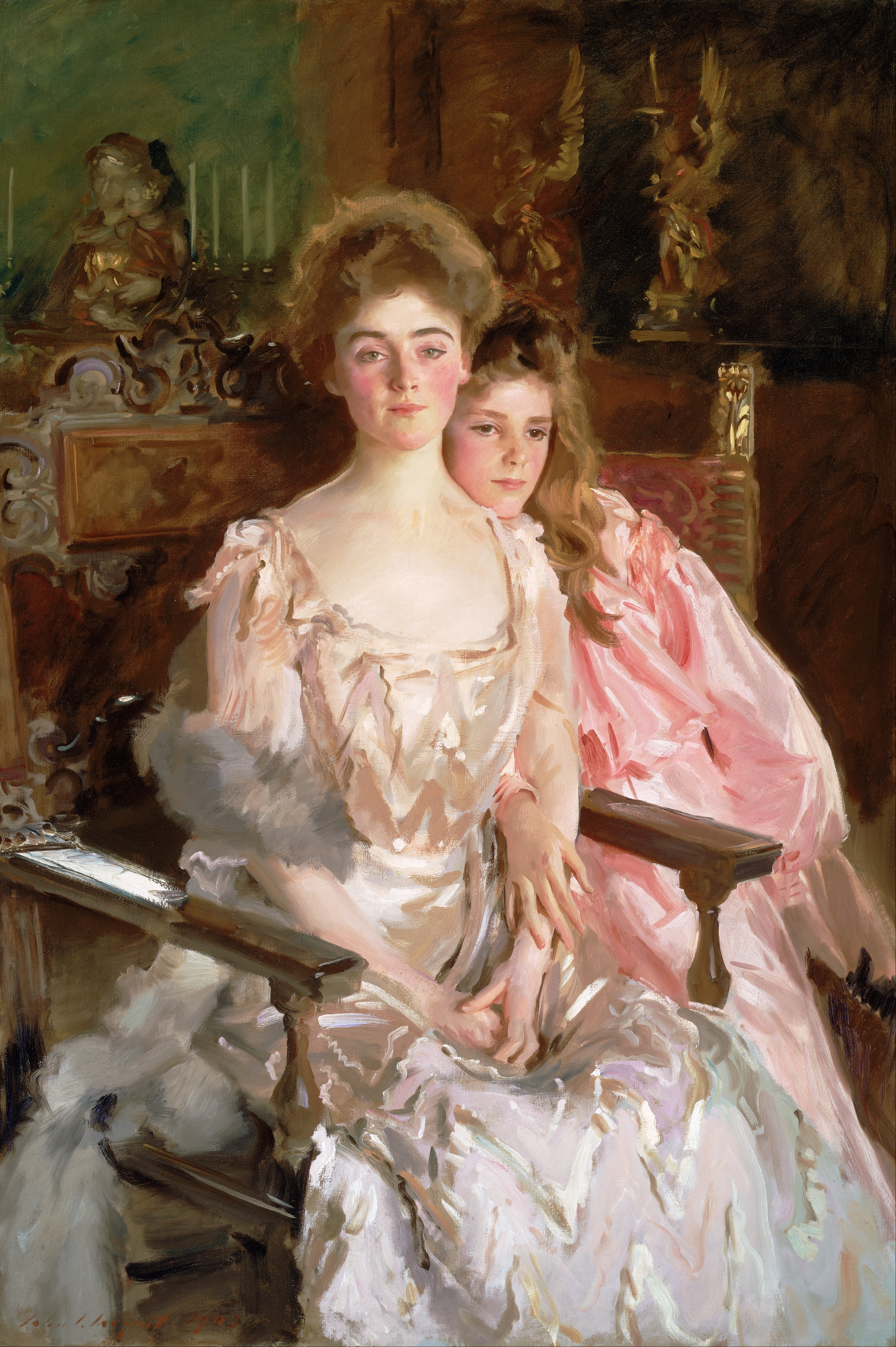
John Singer Sargent, Mrs. Fiske Warren (Gretchen Osgood) and Her Daughter Rachel, 1903

=== European ===
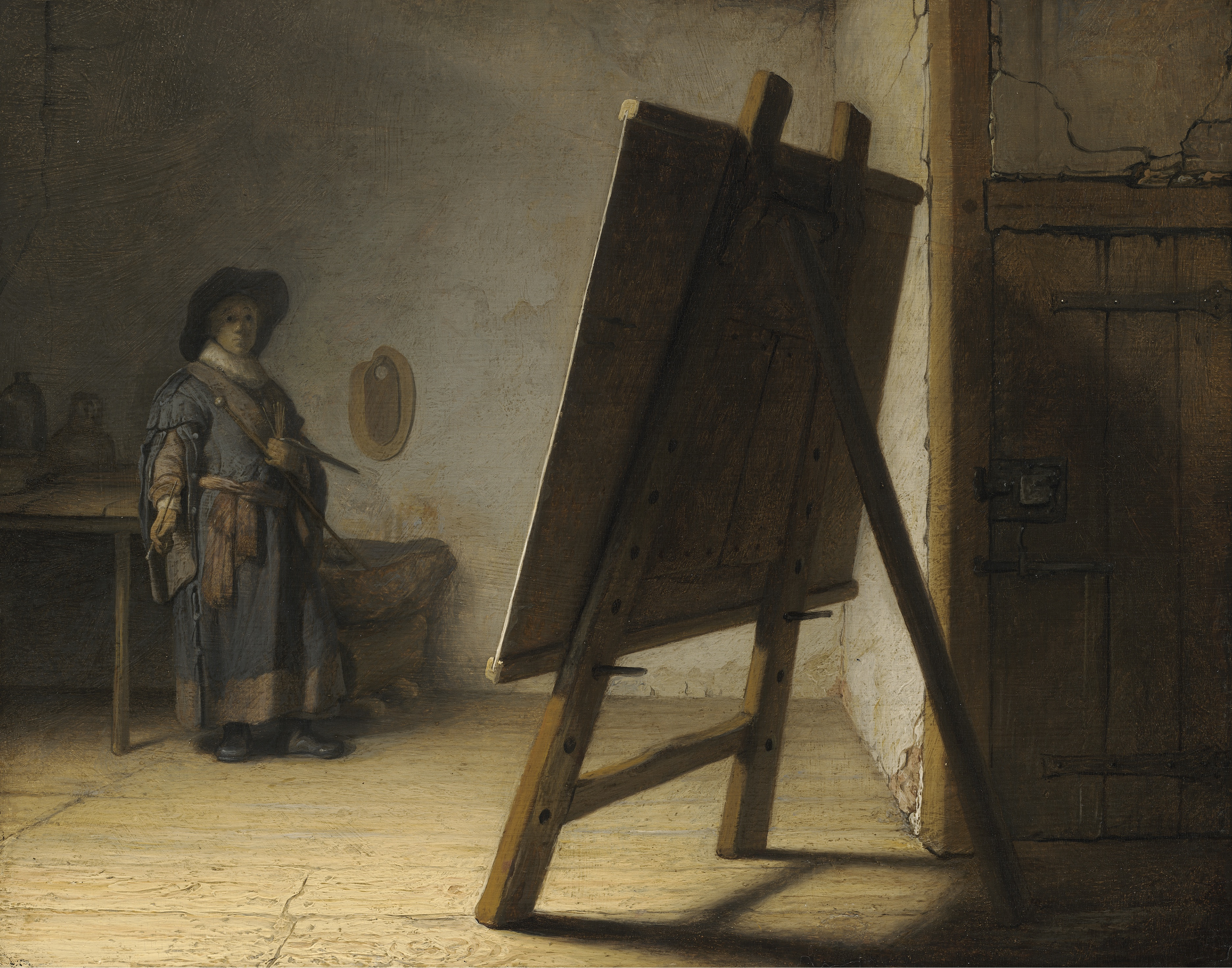
Rembrandt, The Artist in his Studio, 1628

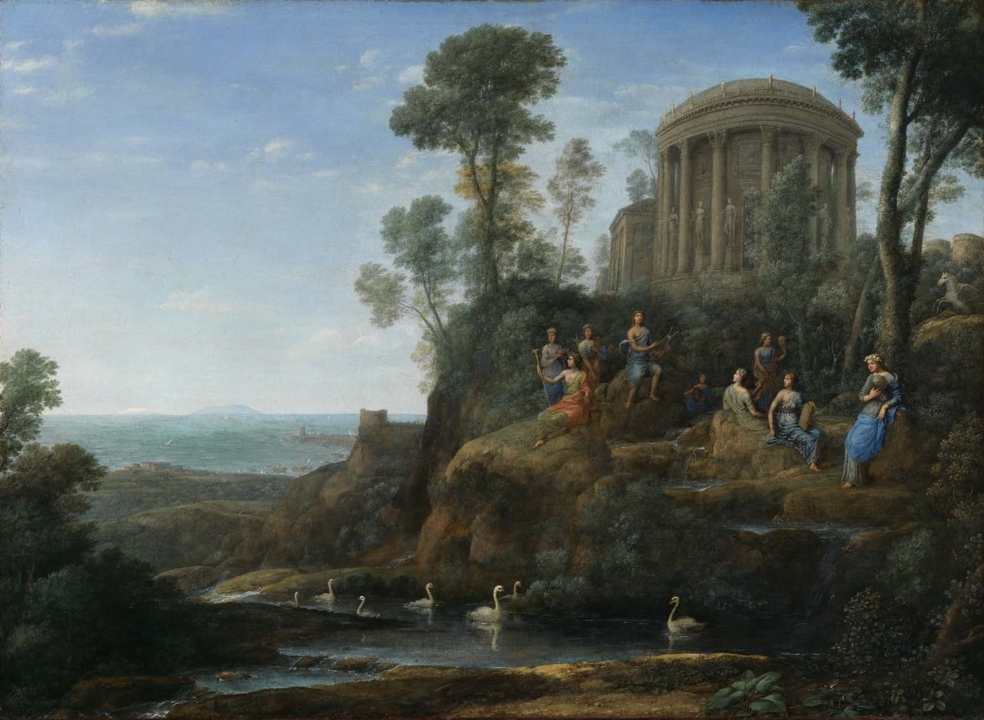
Claude Lorrain, Apollo and the Muses on Mount Helion, 1680

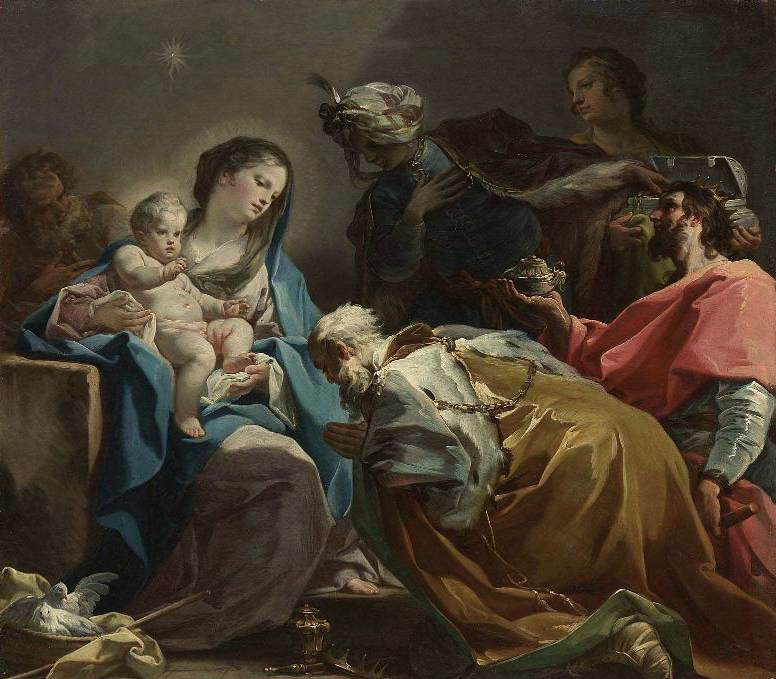
Corrado Giaquinto, Adoration of the Magi, 1725

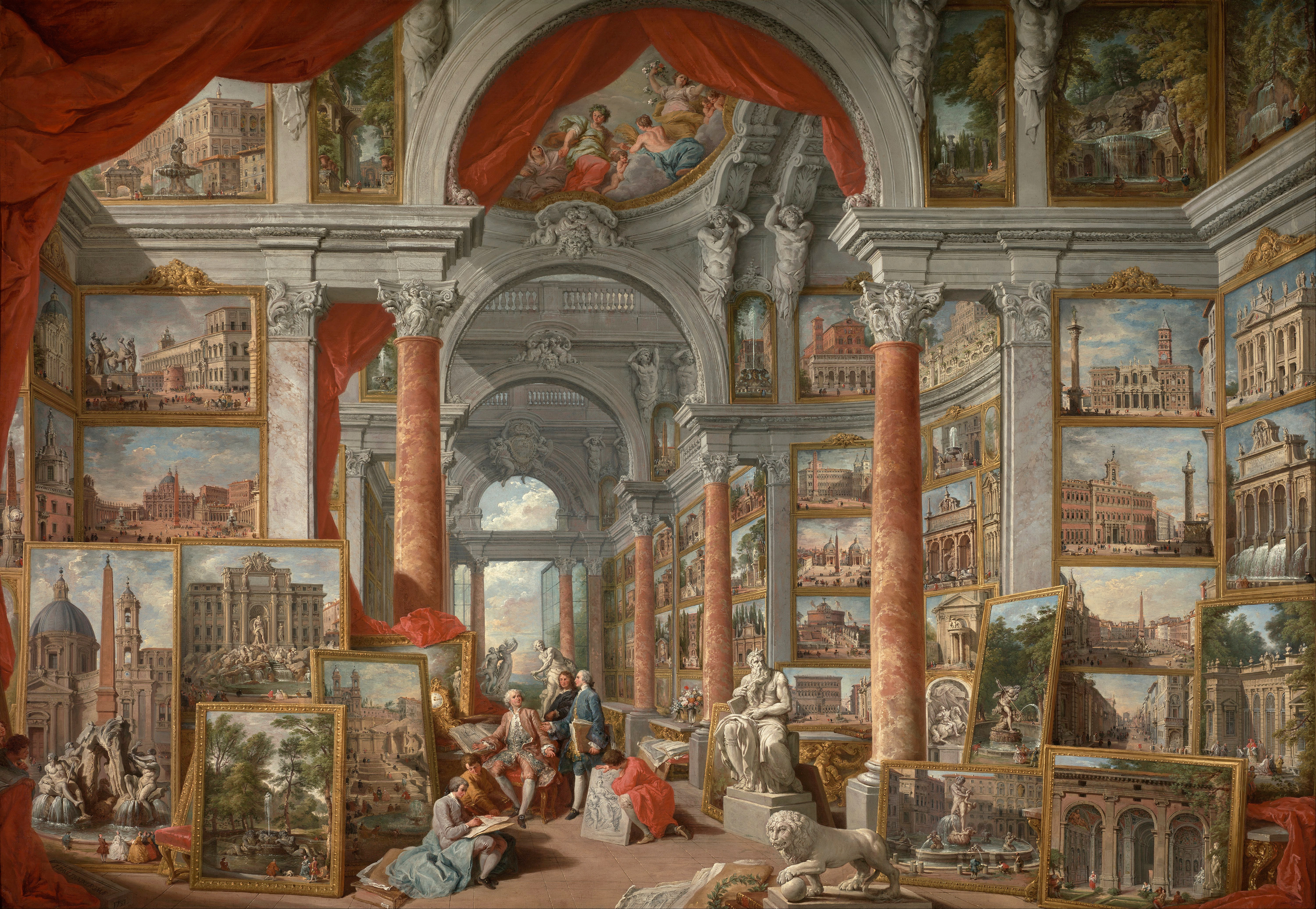
Giovanni Paolo Panini, Picture Gallery with Views of Modern Rome, 1757

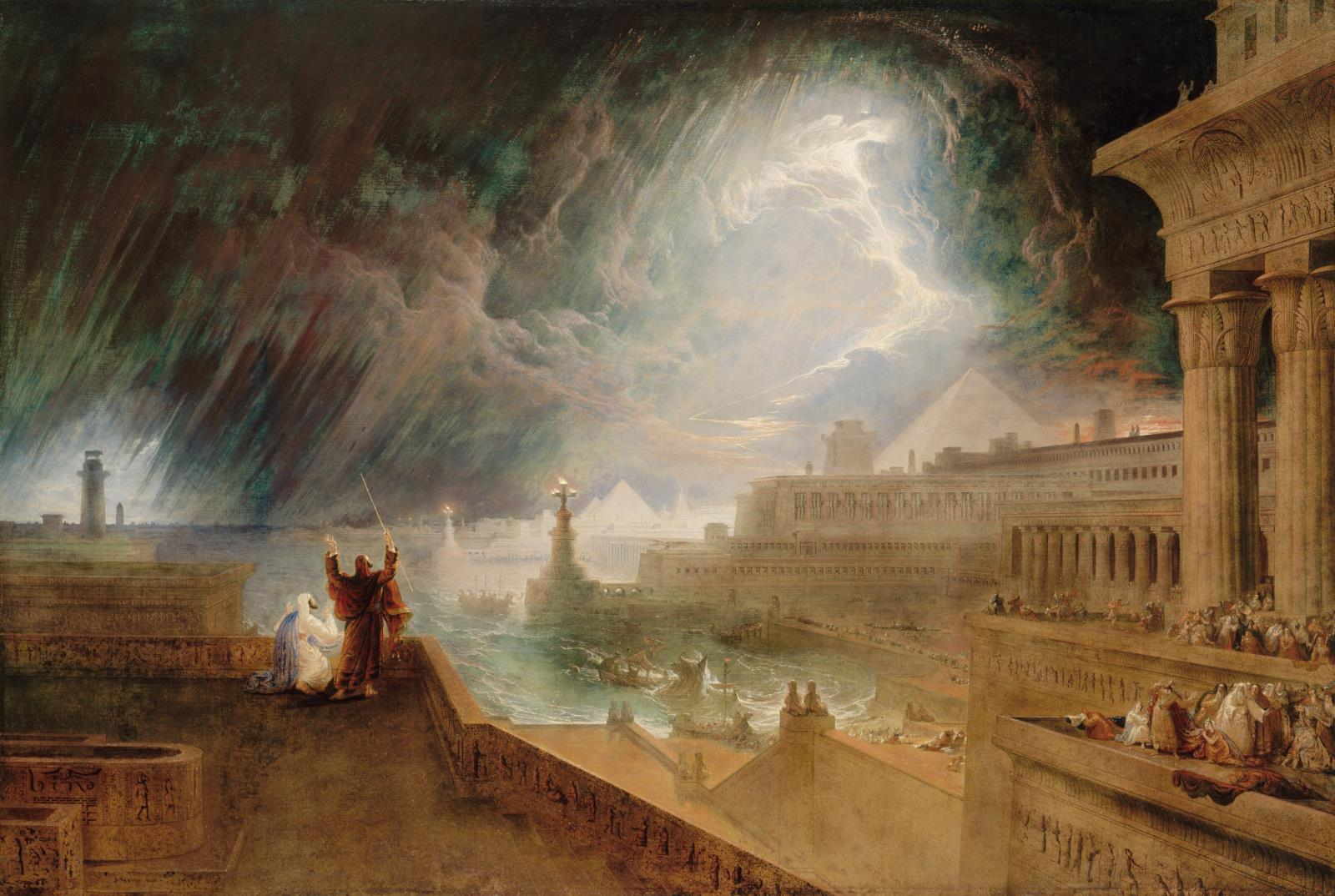
John Martin, The Seventh Plague of Egypt, 1823

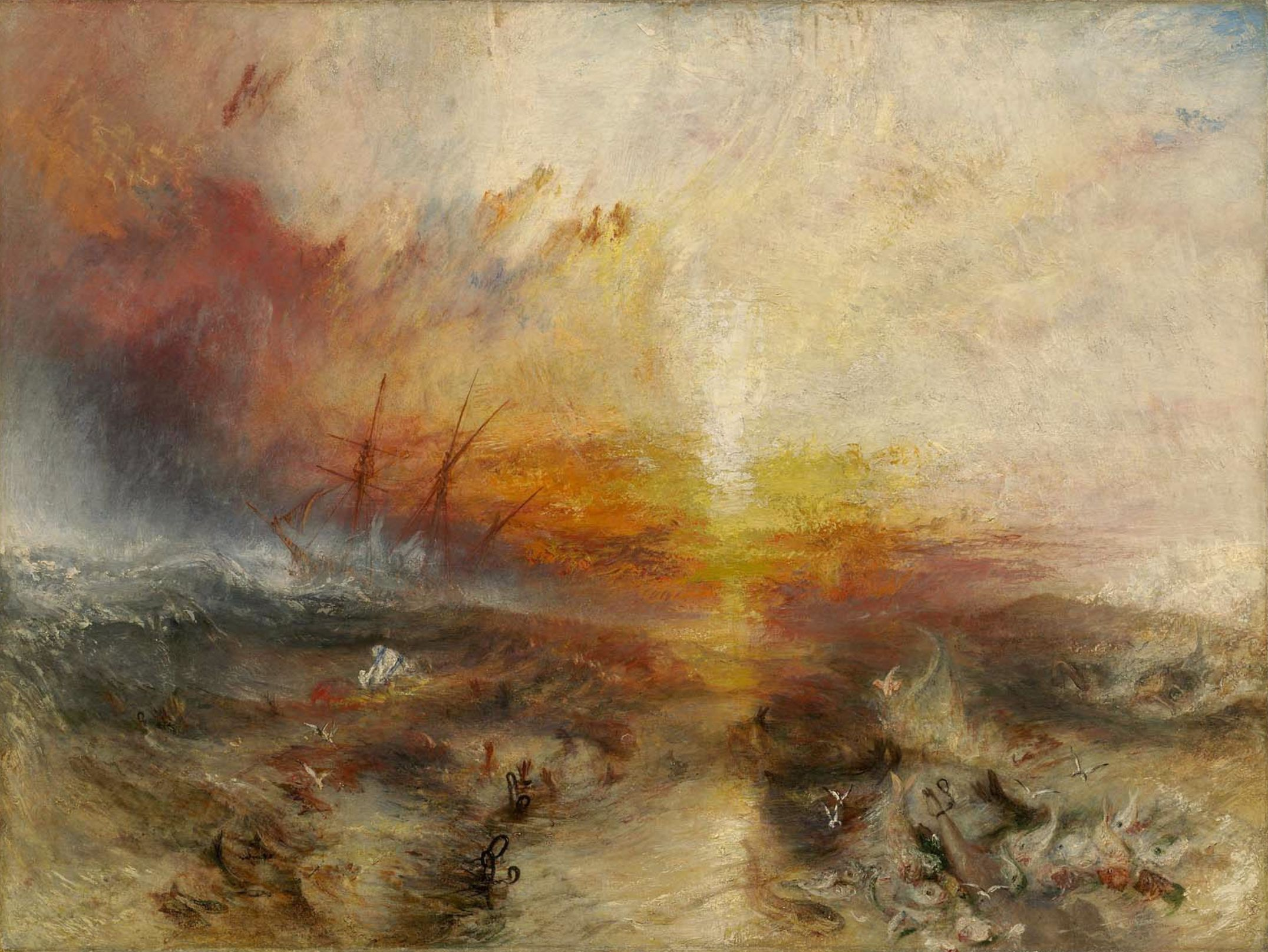
J. M. W. Turner, The Slave Ship 1840

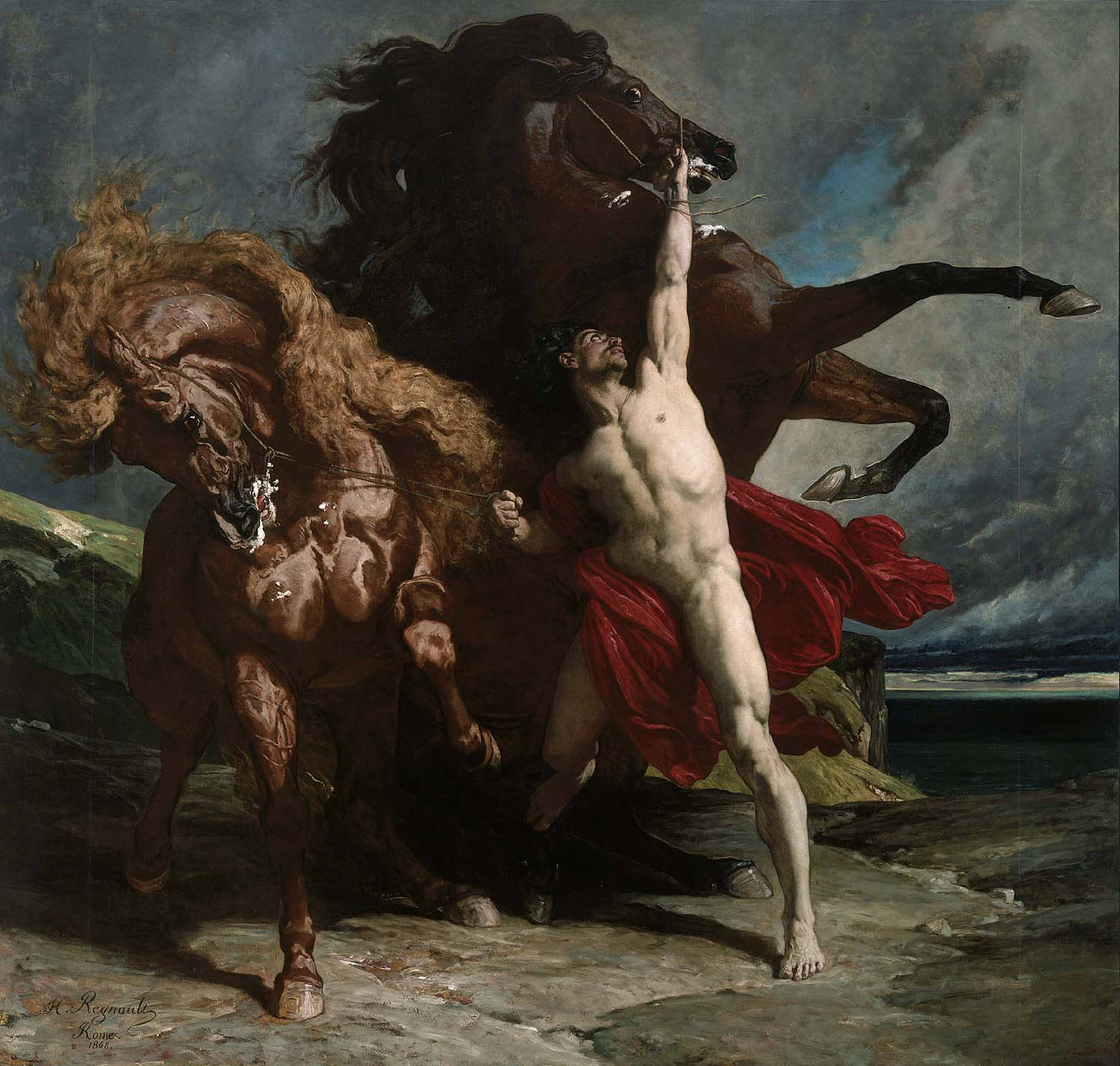
Henri Regnault, Automedon with the Horses of Achilles, 1868

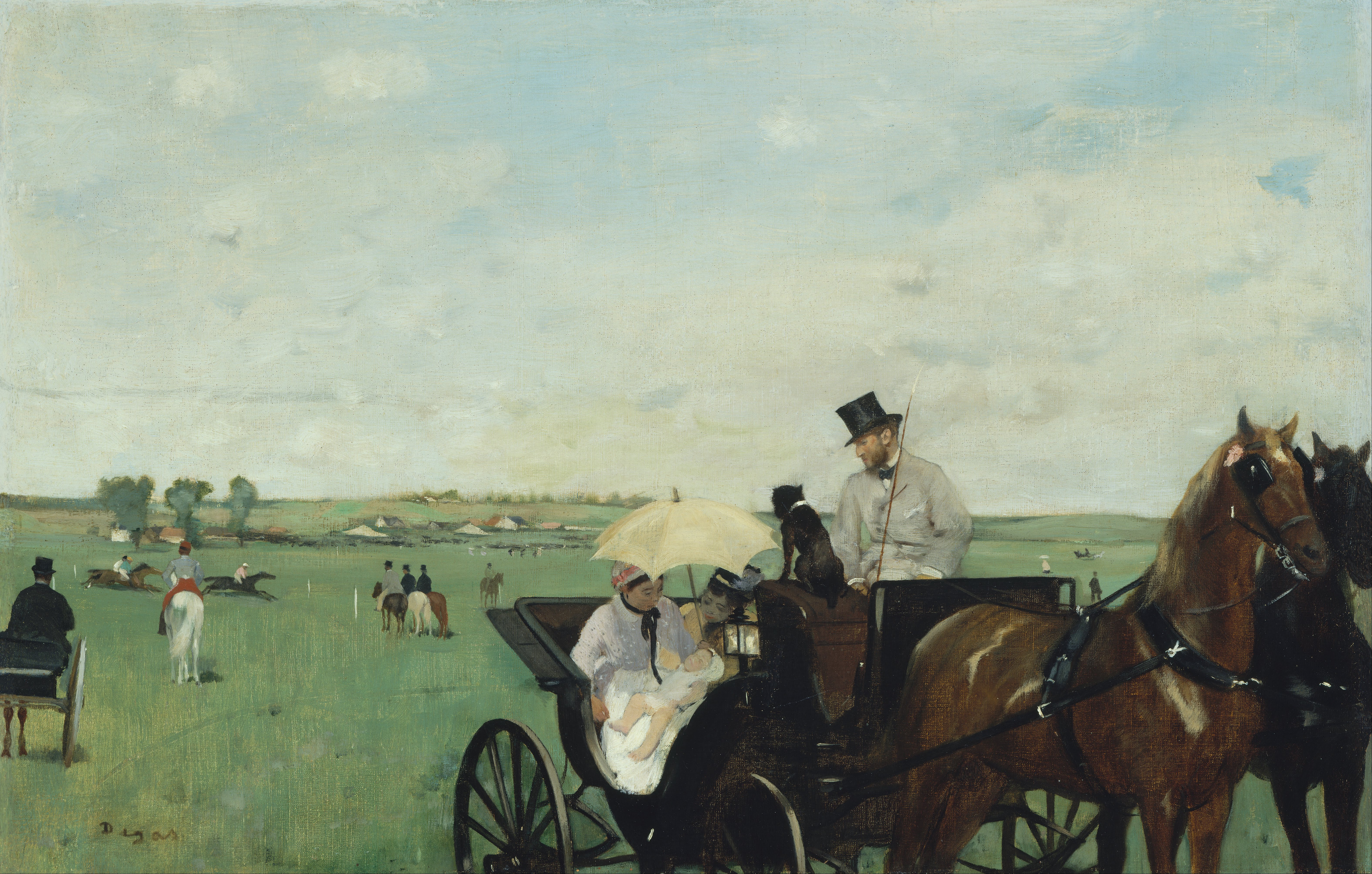
Edgar Degas, At the Races in the Countryside, 1869

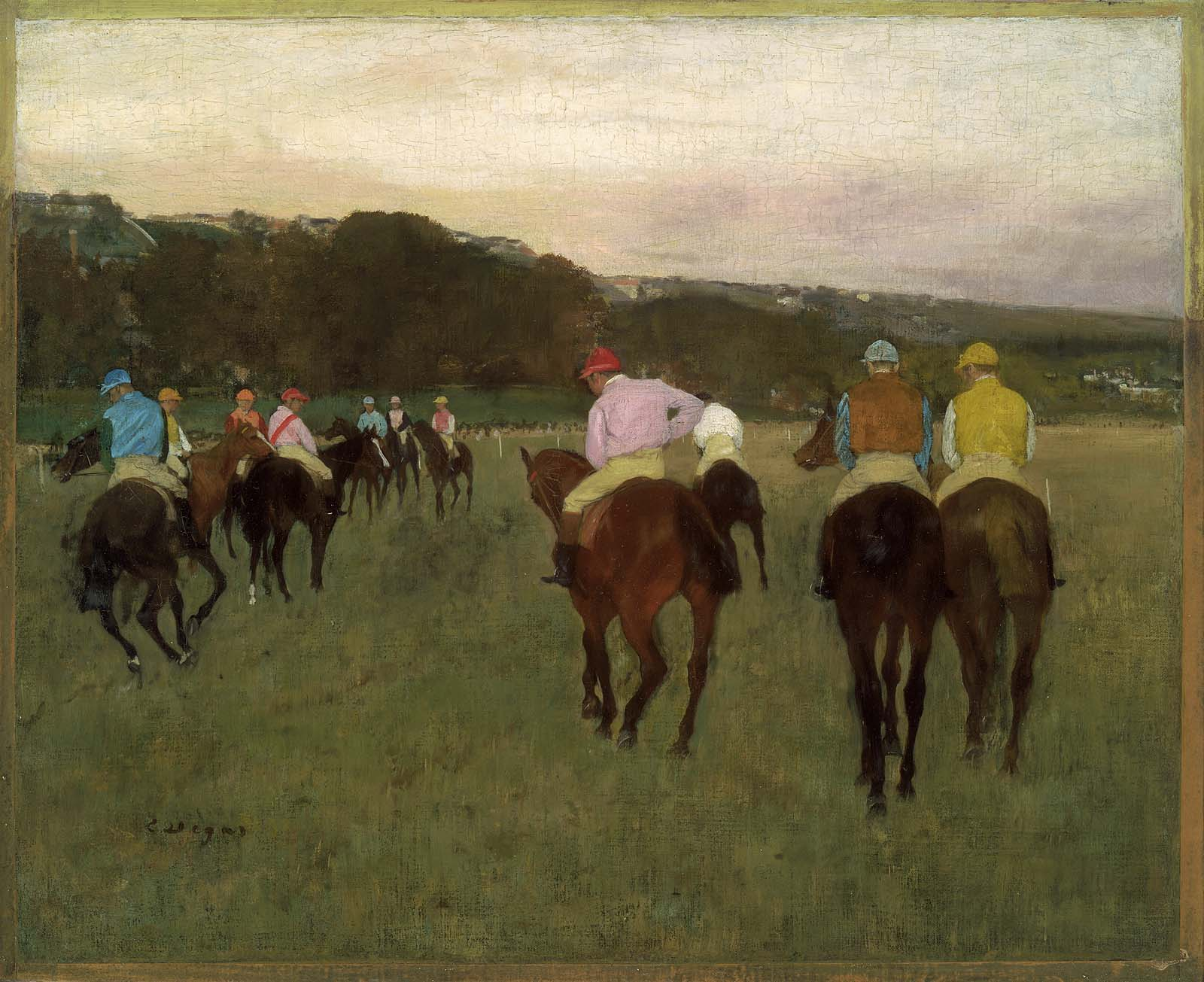
Edgar Degas, Racehorses at Longchamp, 1873–1875

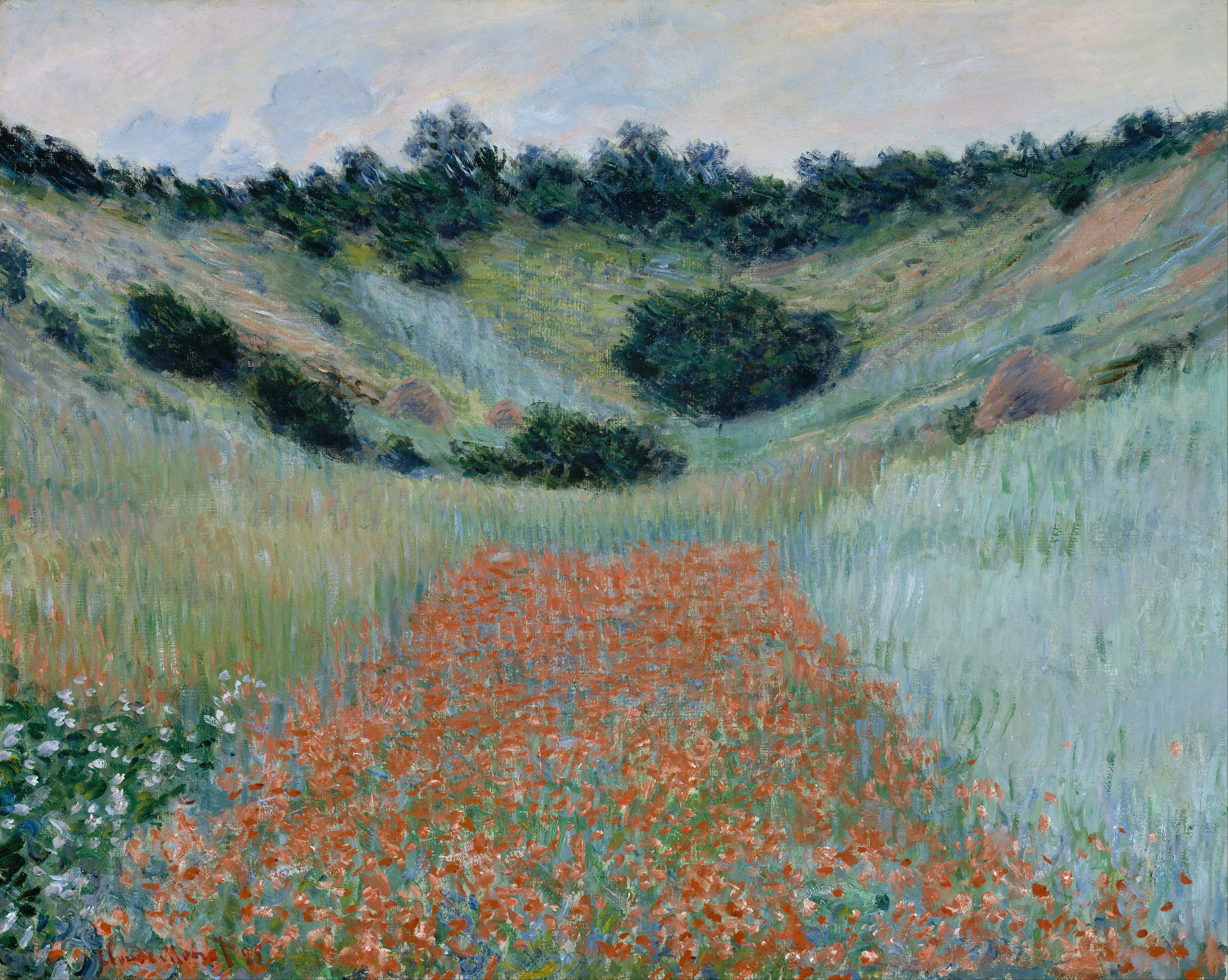
Claude Monet, Poppy Field in a Hollow near Giverny, 1888

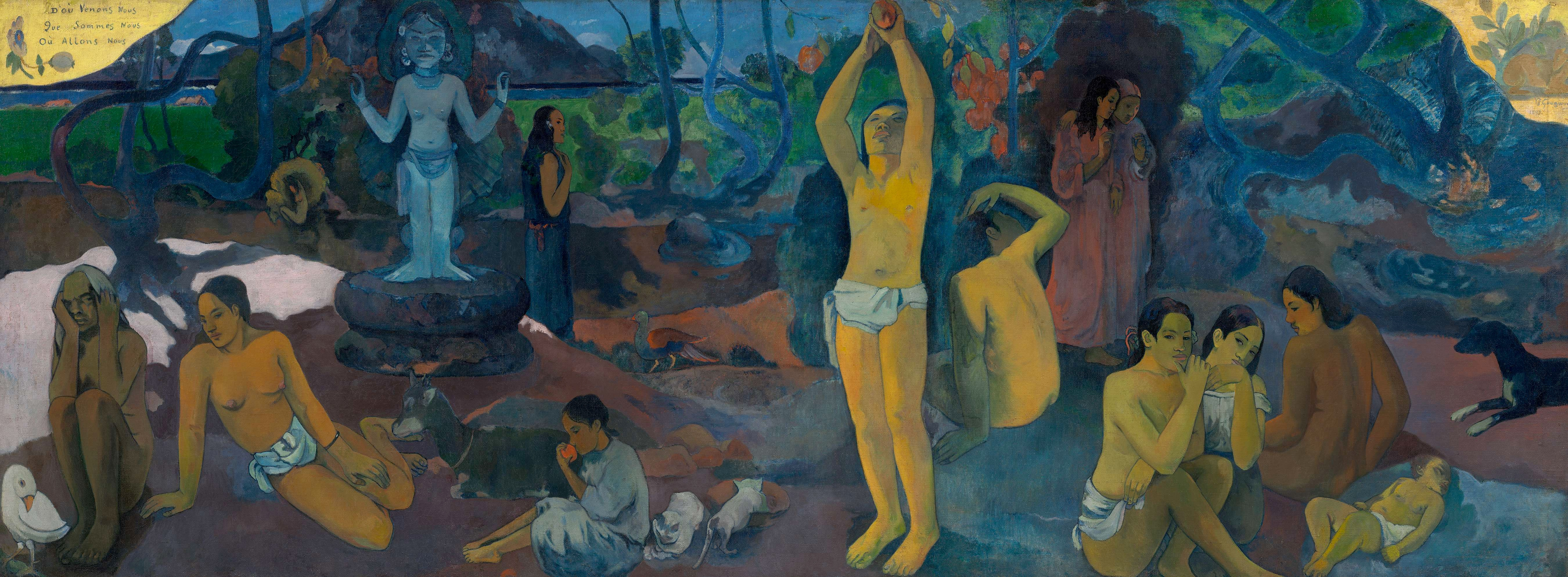
Paul Gauguin, Where Do We Come From? What Are We? Where Are We Going?, 1897
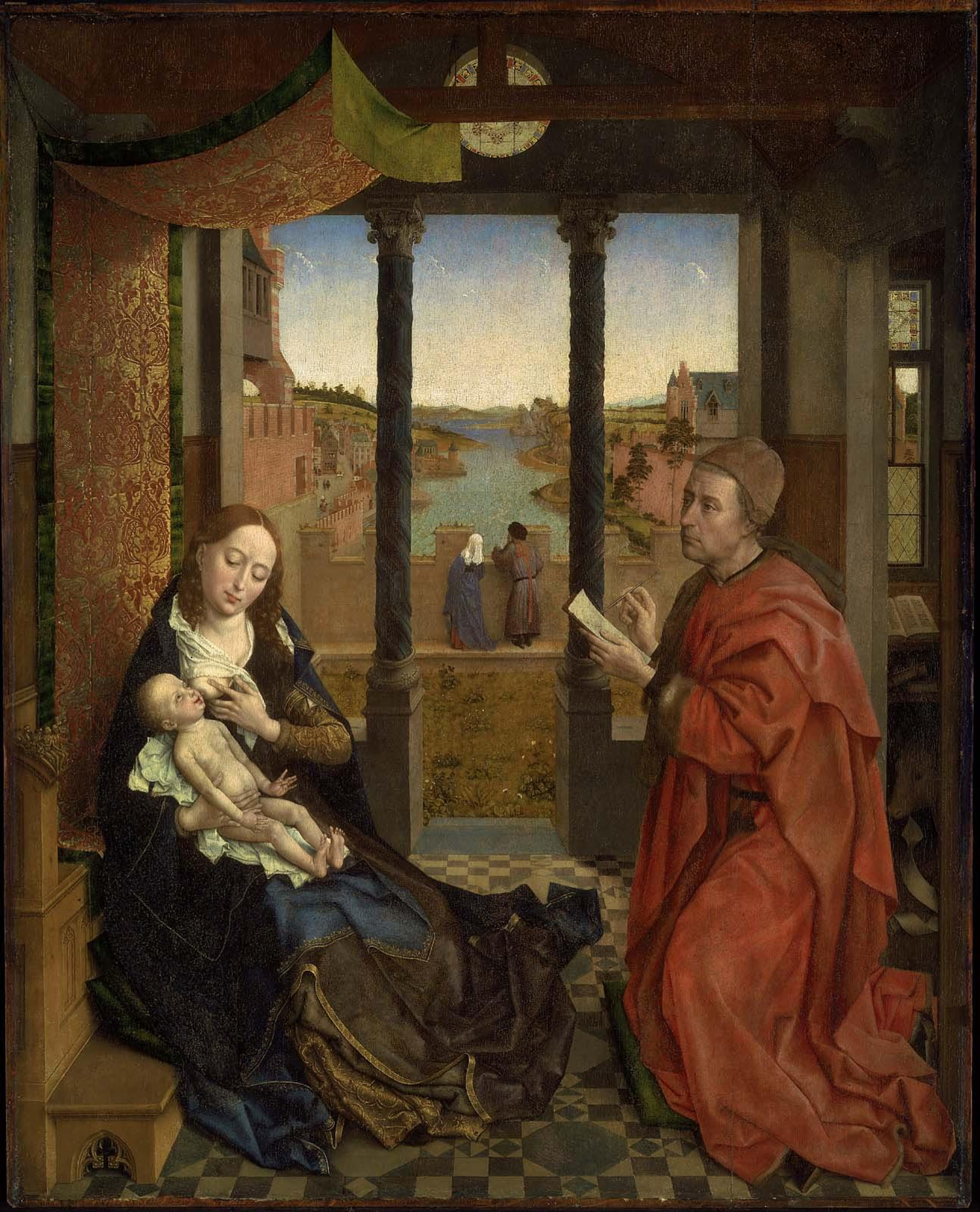
Rogier van der Weyden, Saint Luke Drawing the Virgin, 1435–1440

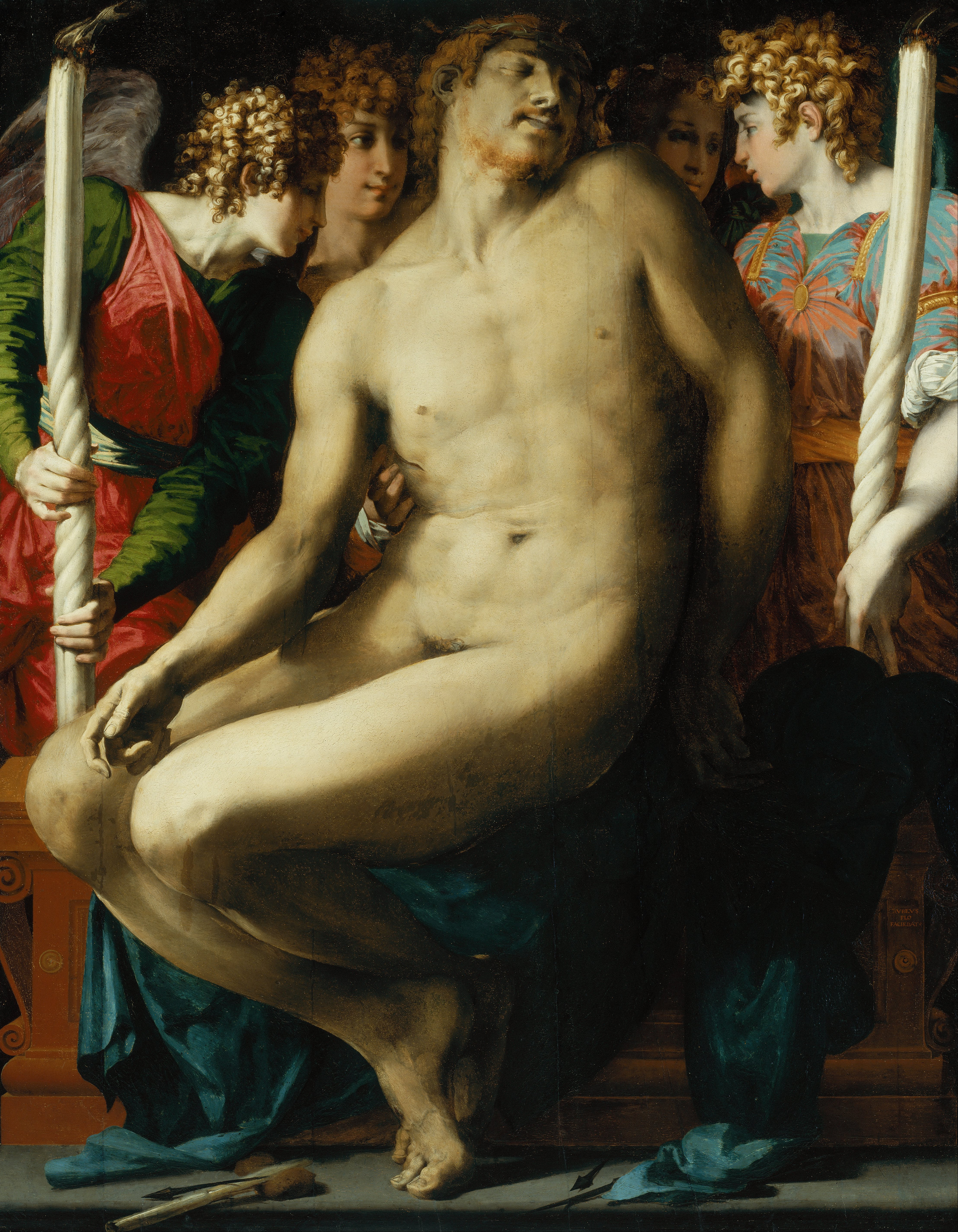
Rosso Fiorentino, The Dead Christ with Angels, 1524–1527

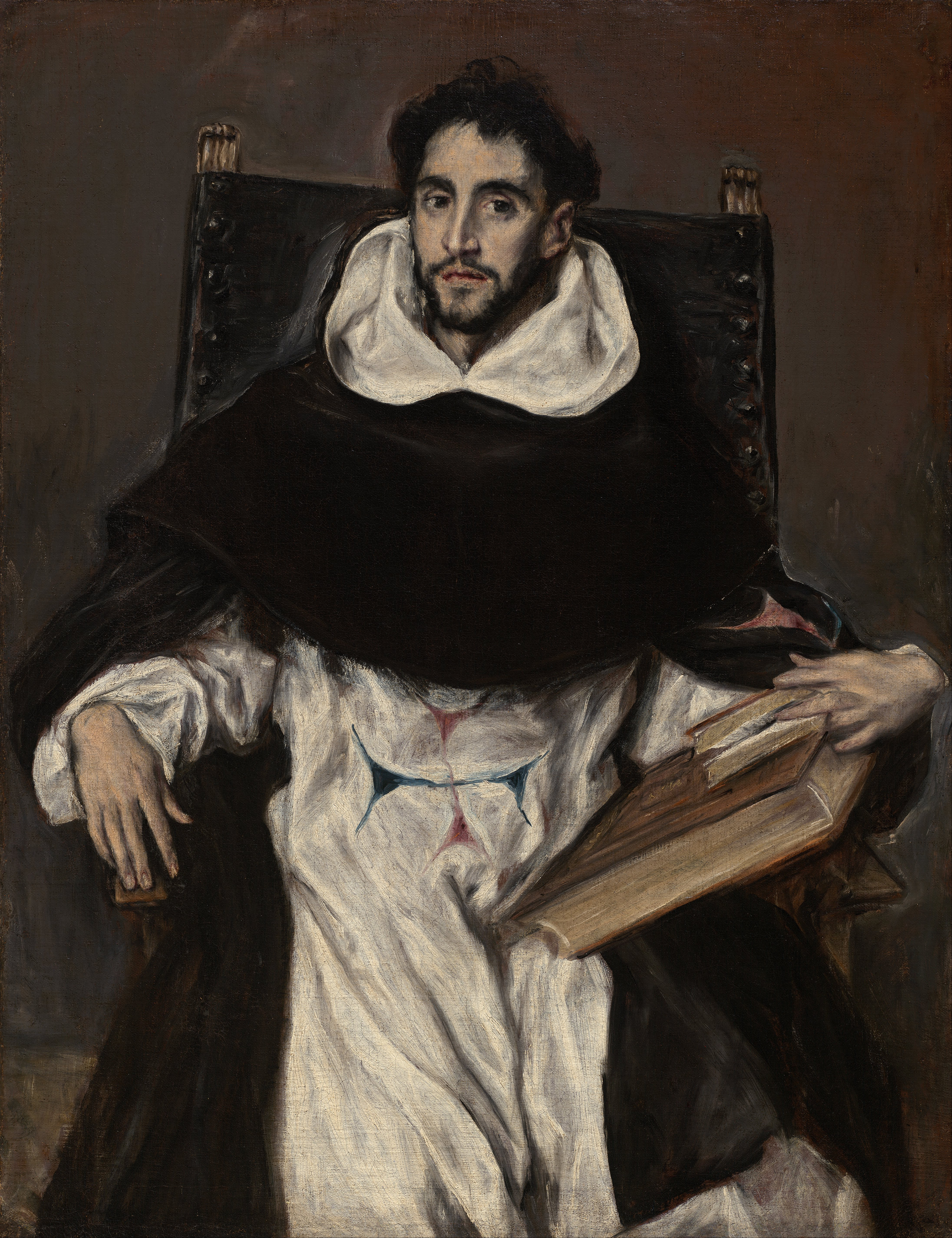
El Greco, Fray Hortensio Félix Paravicino, 1609

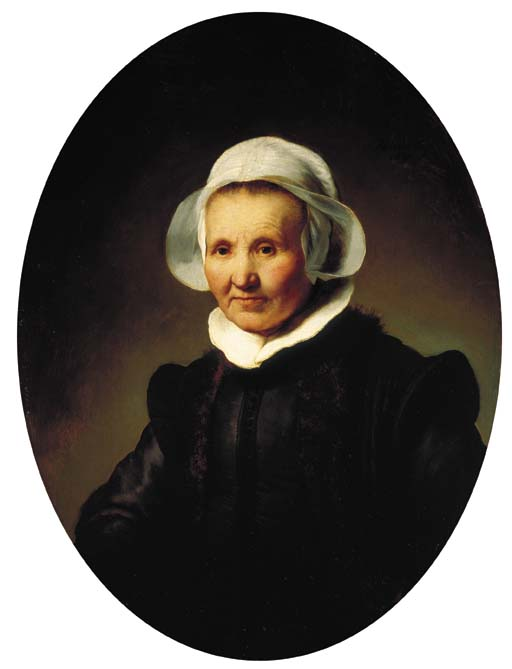
Rembrandt, Portrait of a 62-year-old Woman, 1632

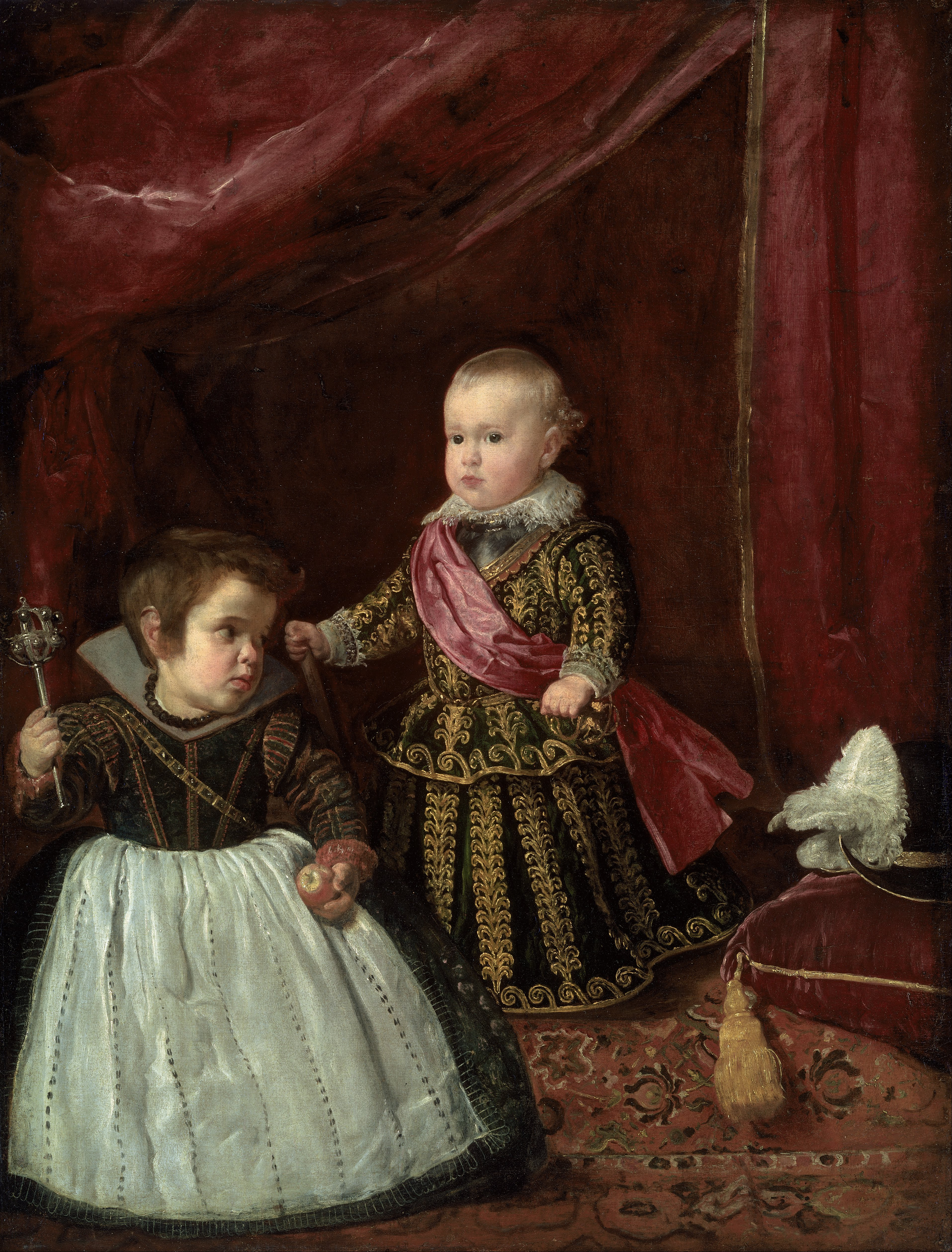
Diego Velázquez, Don Baltasar Carlos with a Dwarf, 1632

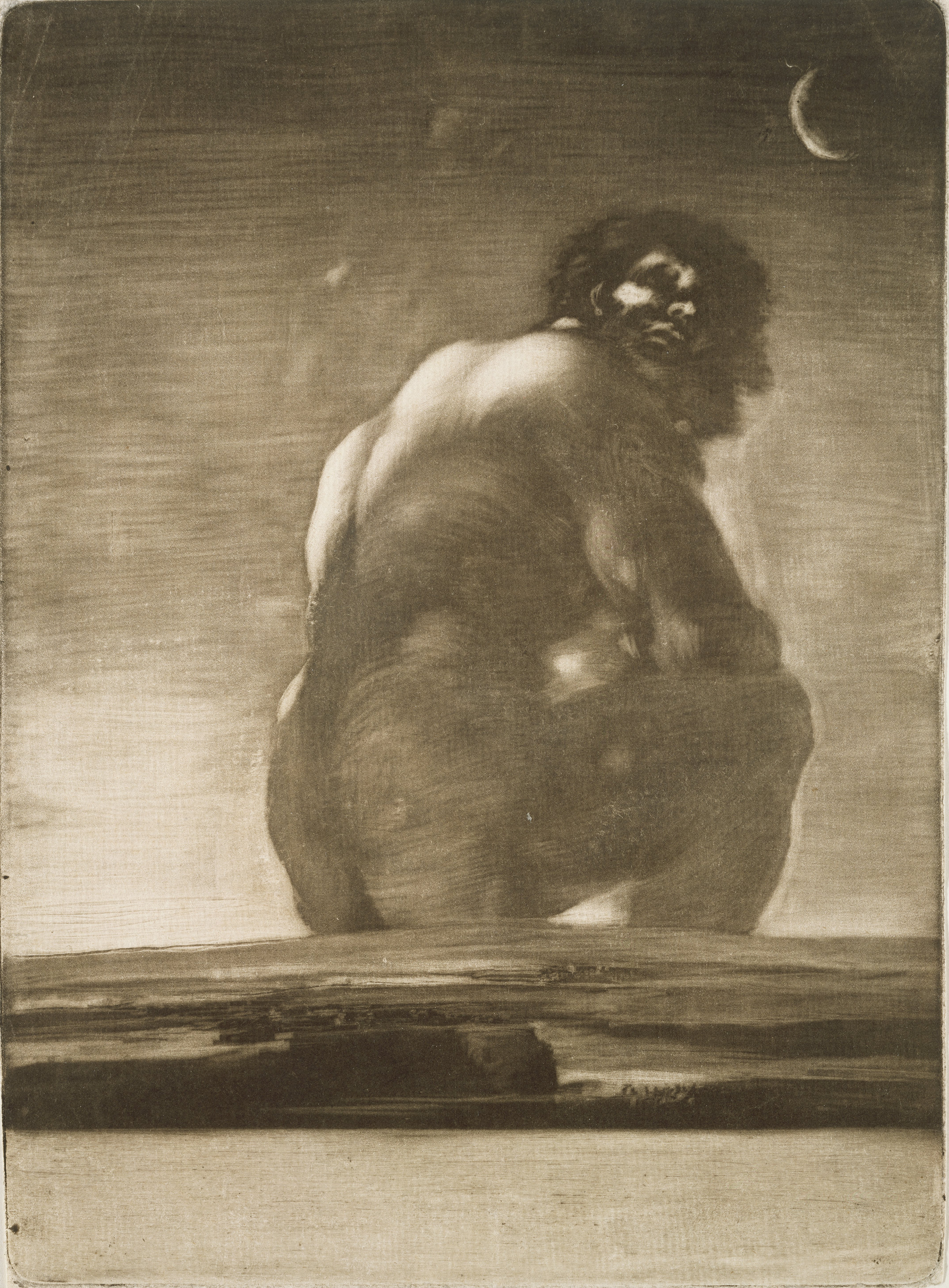
Francisco Goya, Seated Giant, 1818

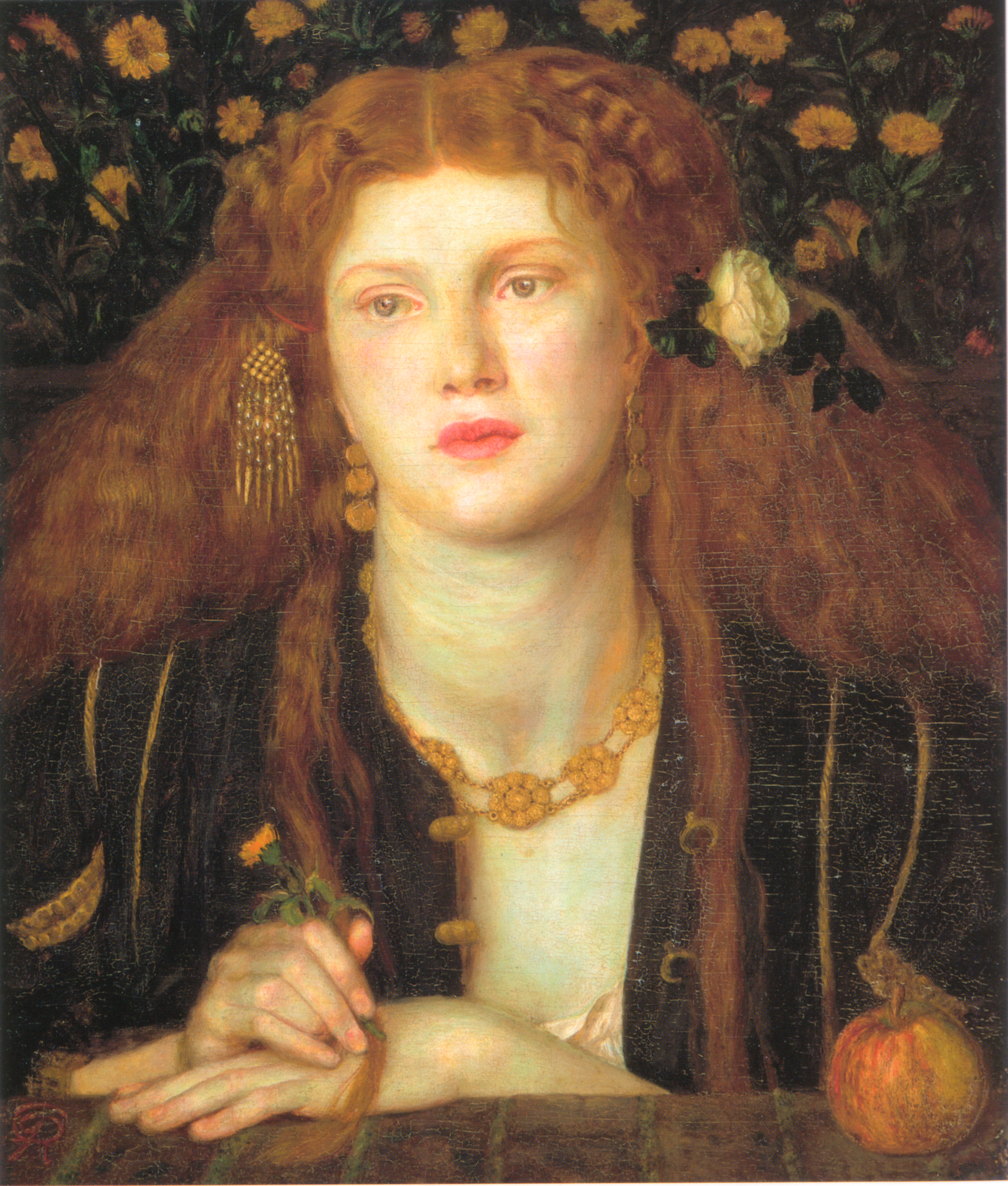
Dante Gabriel Rossetti, Bocca Baciata, 1859

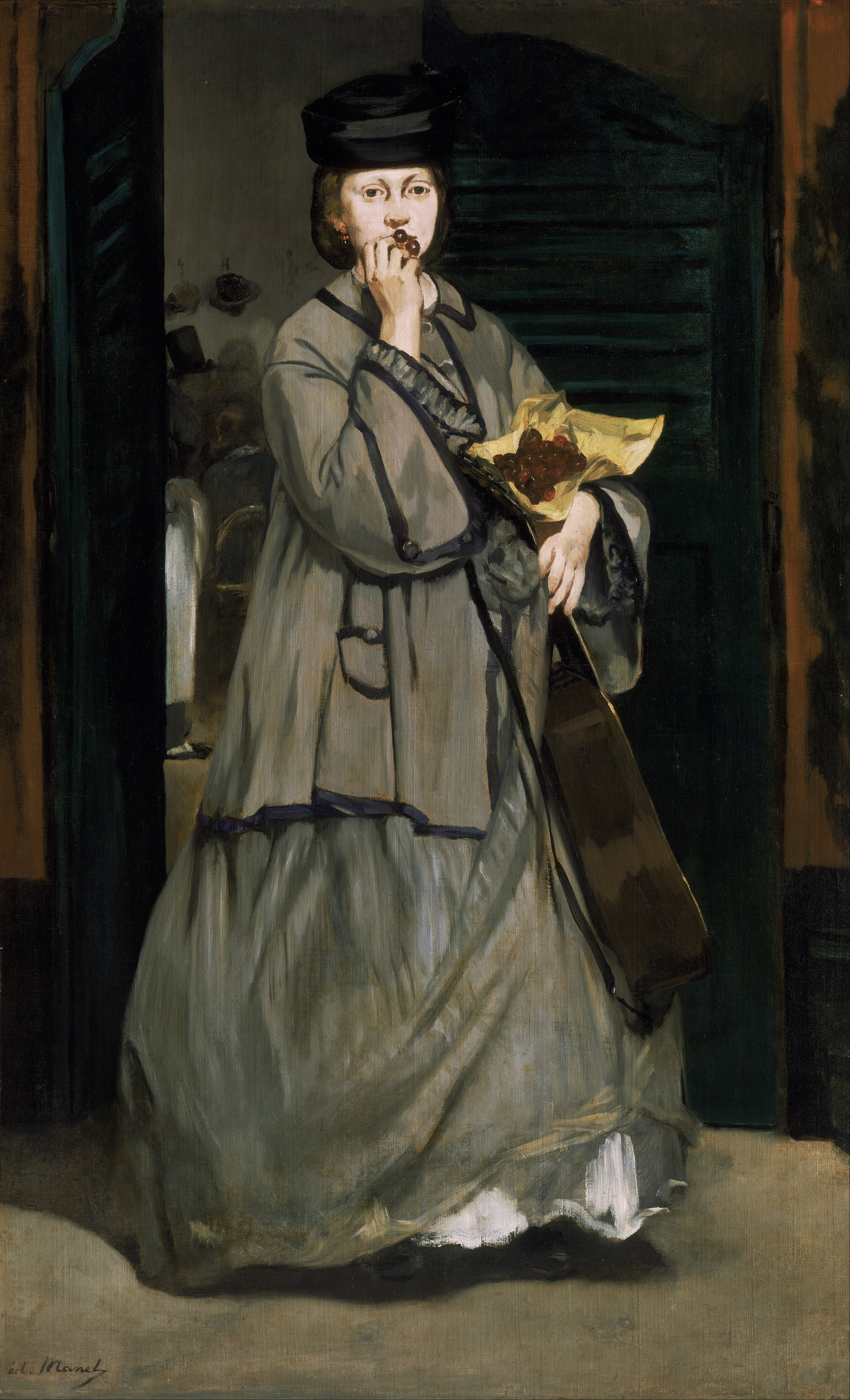
Édouard Manet, Street Singer, 1862

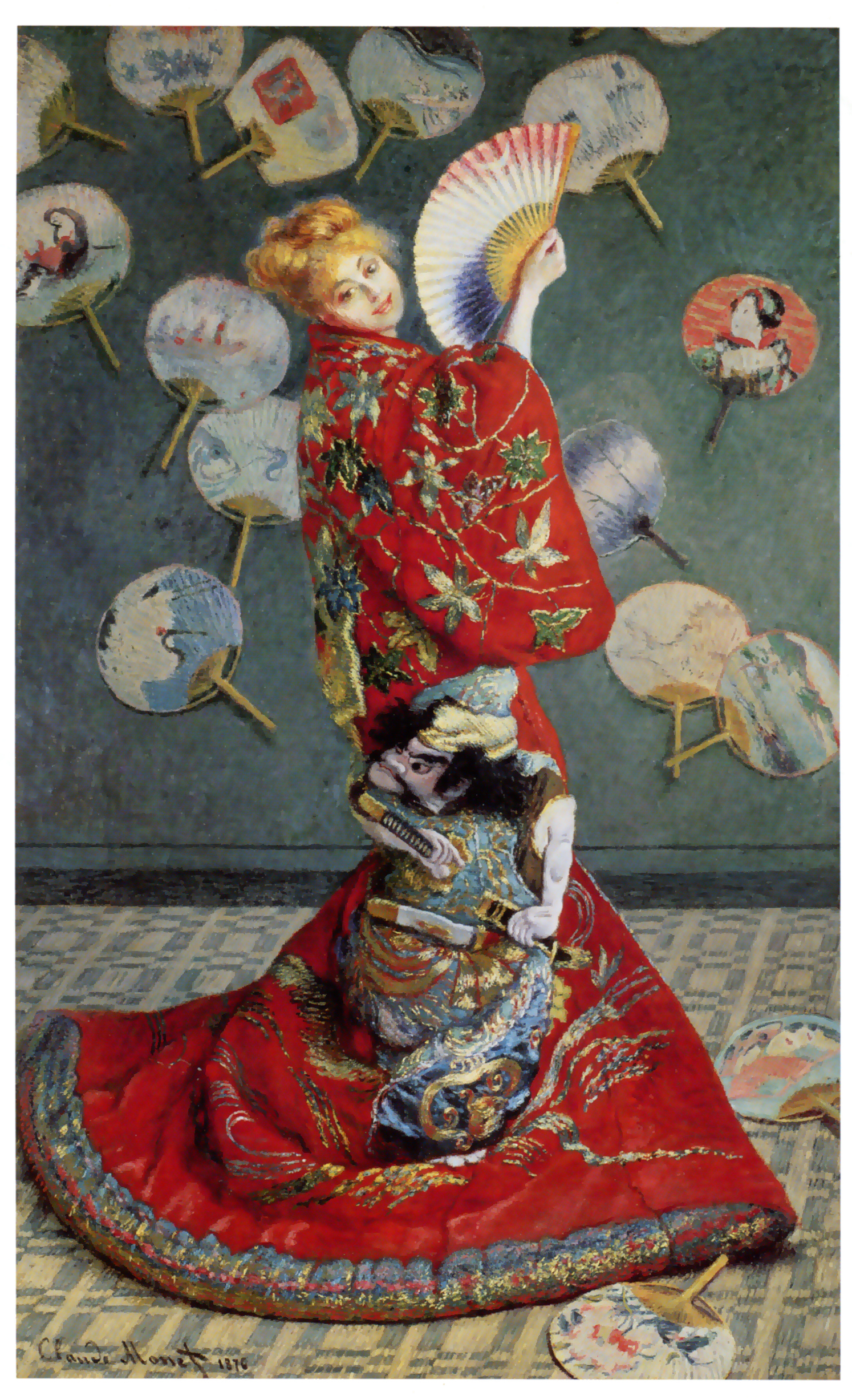
Claude Monet, La Japonaise, 1876

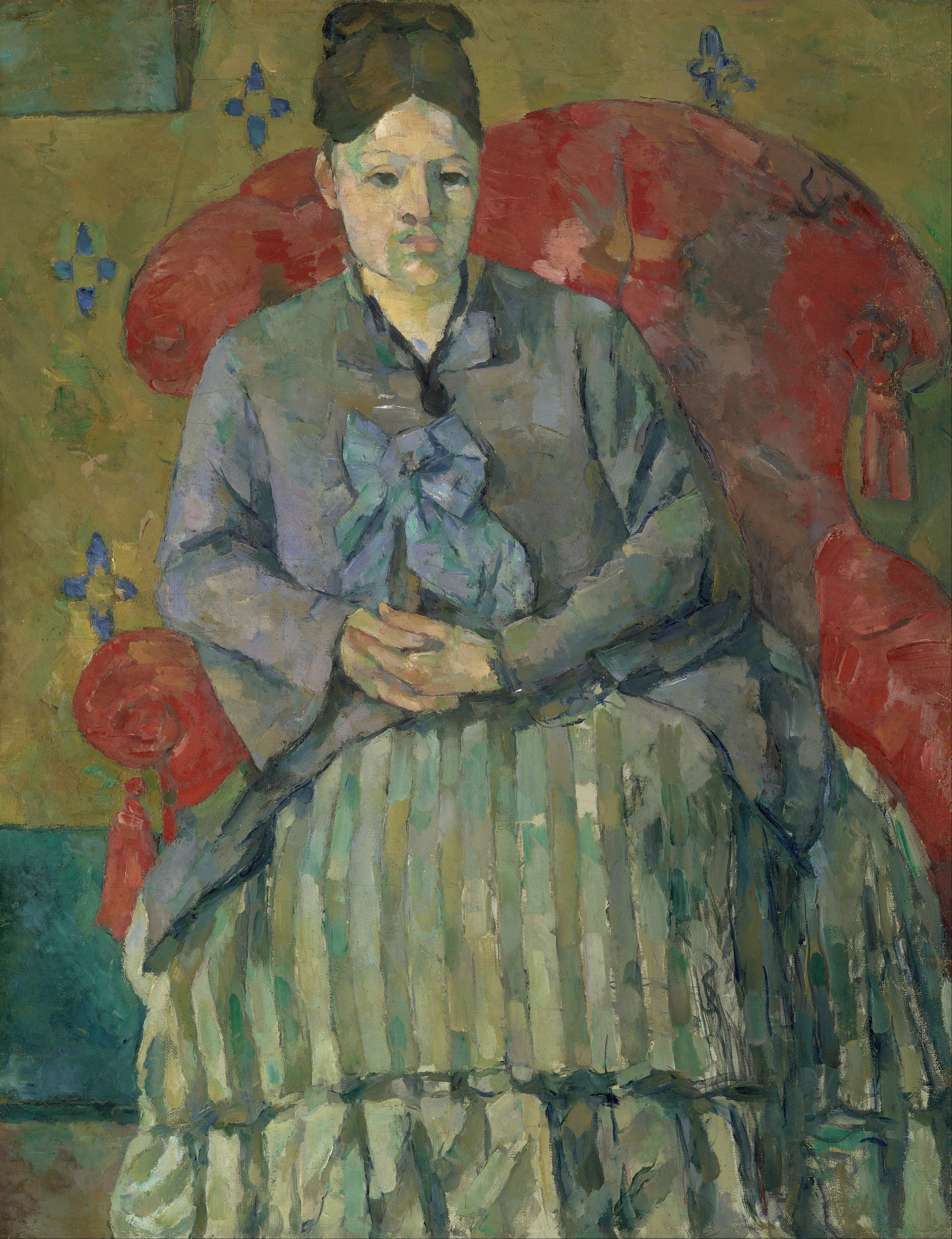
Paul Cézanne, Madame Cézanne in a Red Armchair, 1877

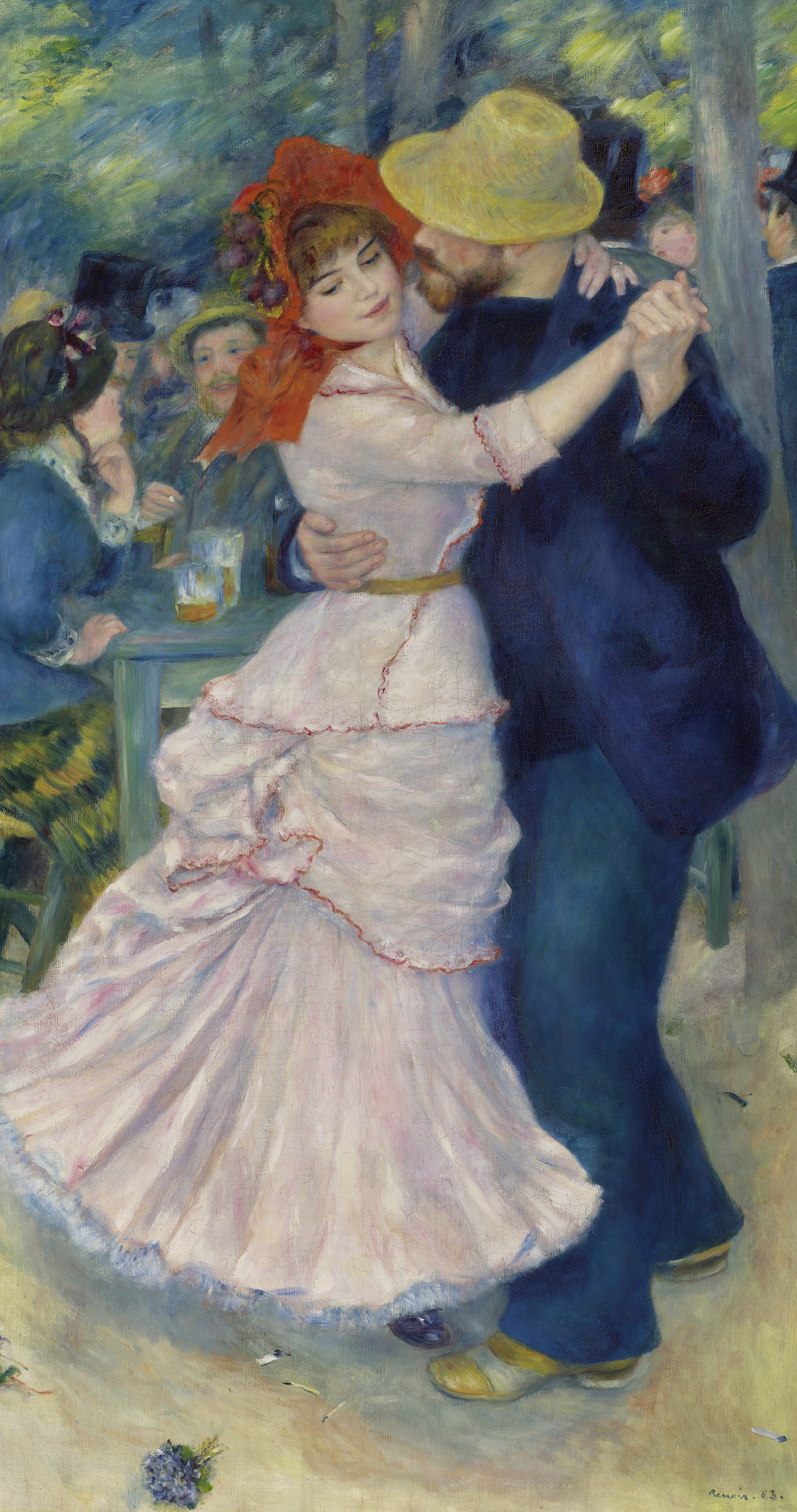
Auguste Renoir, Dance at Bougival, 1883

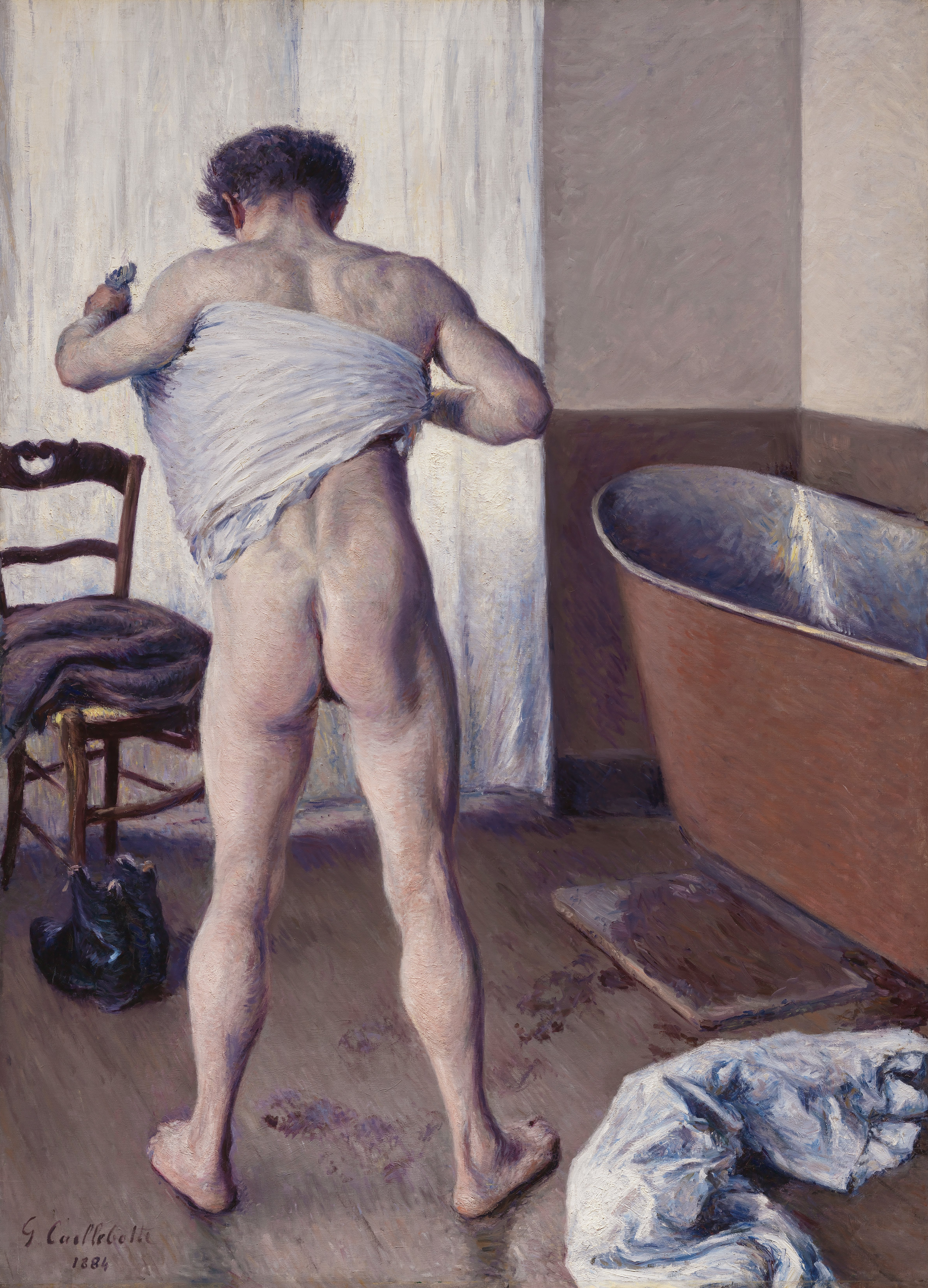
Gustave Caillebotte, Man at His Bath, 1884

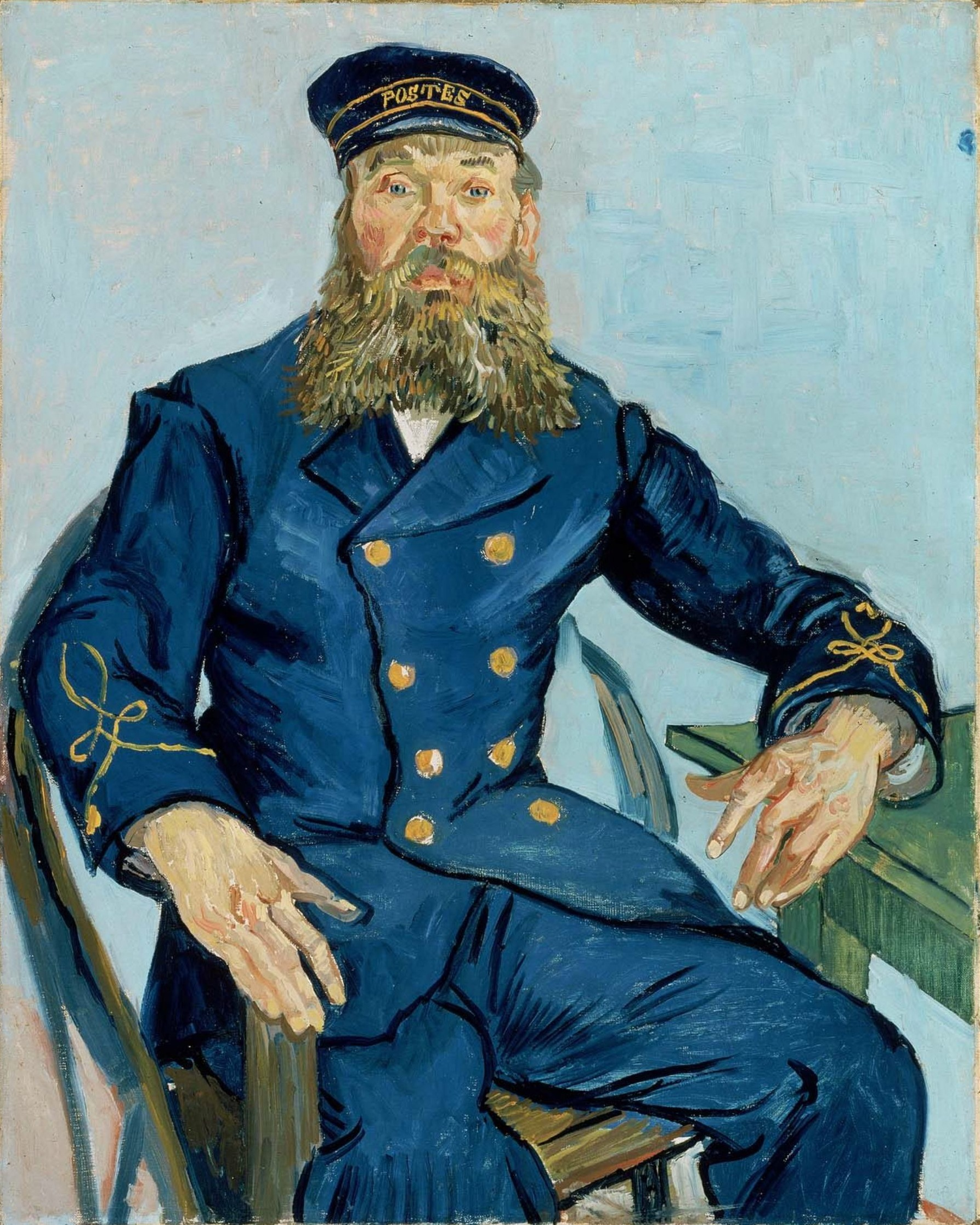
Vincent van Gogh, Postman Joseph Roulin, 1888

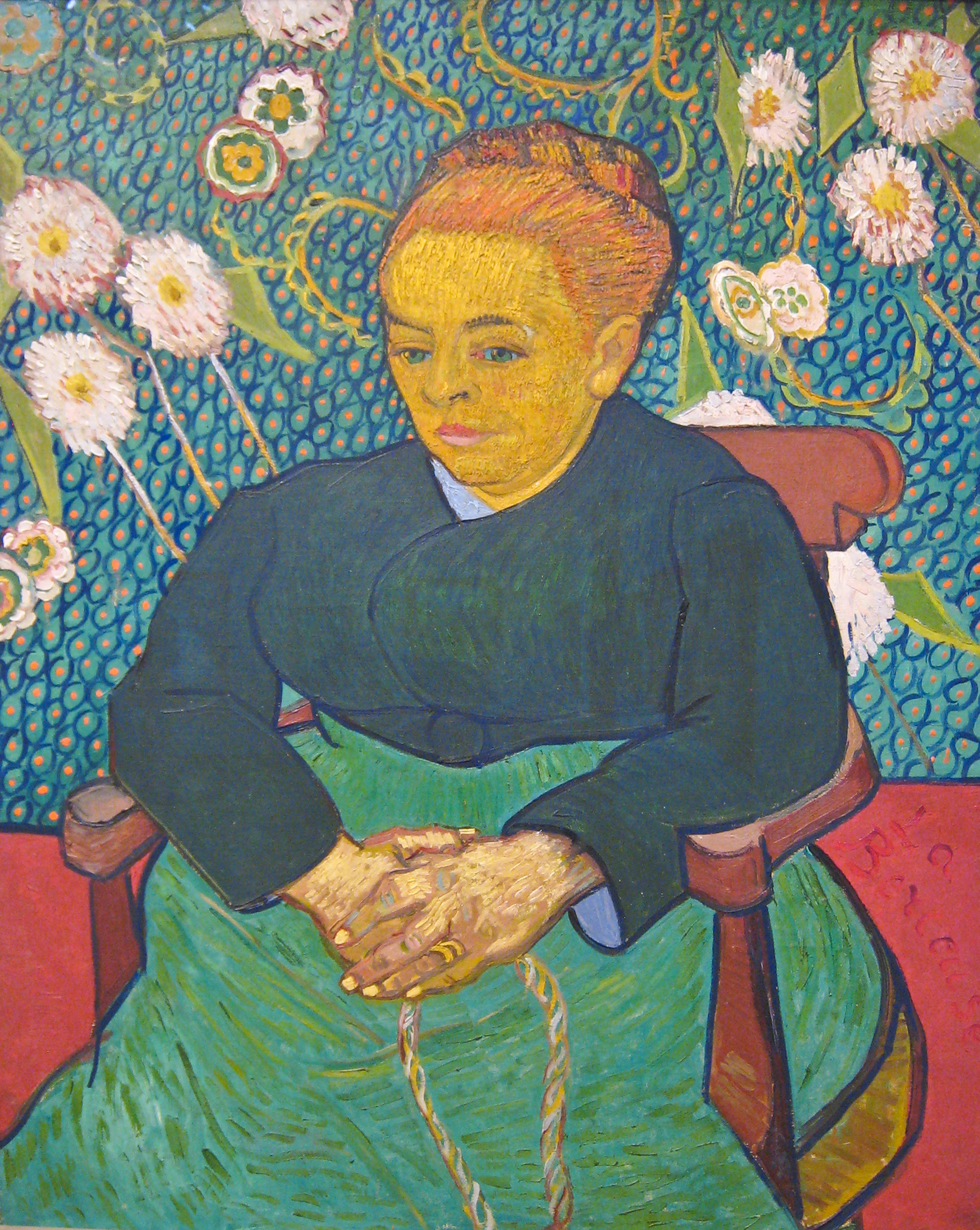
Vincent van Gogh, La Berceuse, 1889

=== Antiquities ===
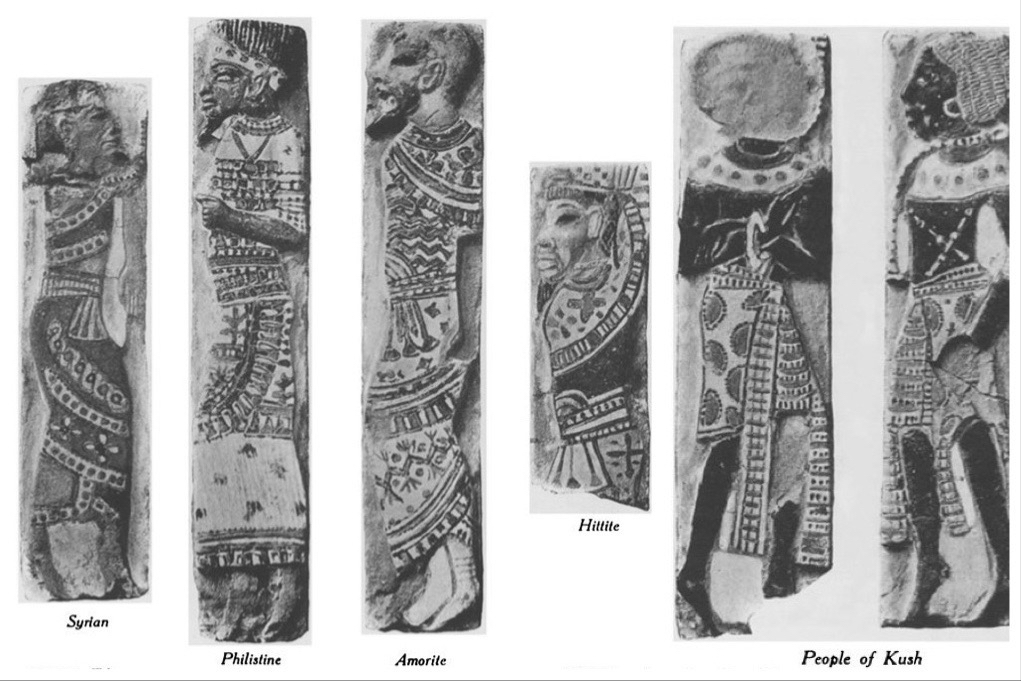
Ramesses III prisoner tiles

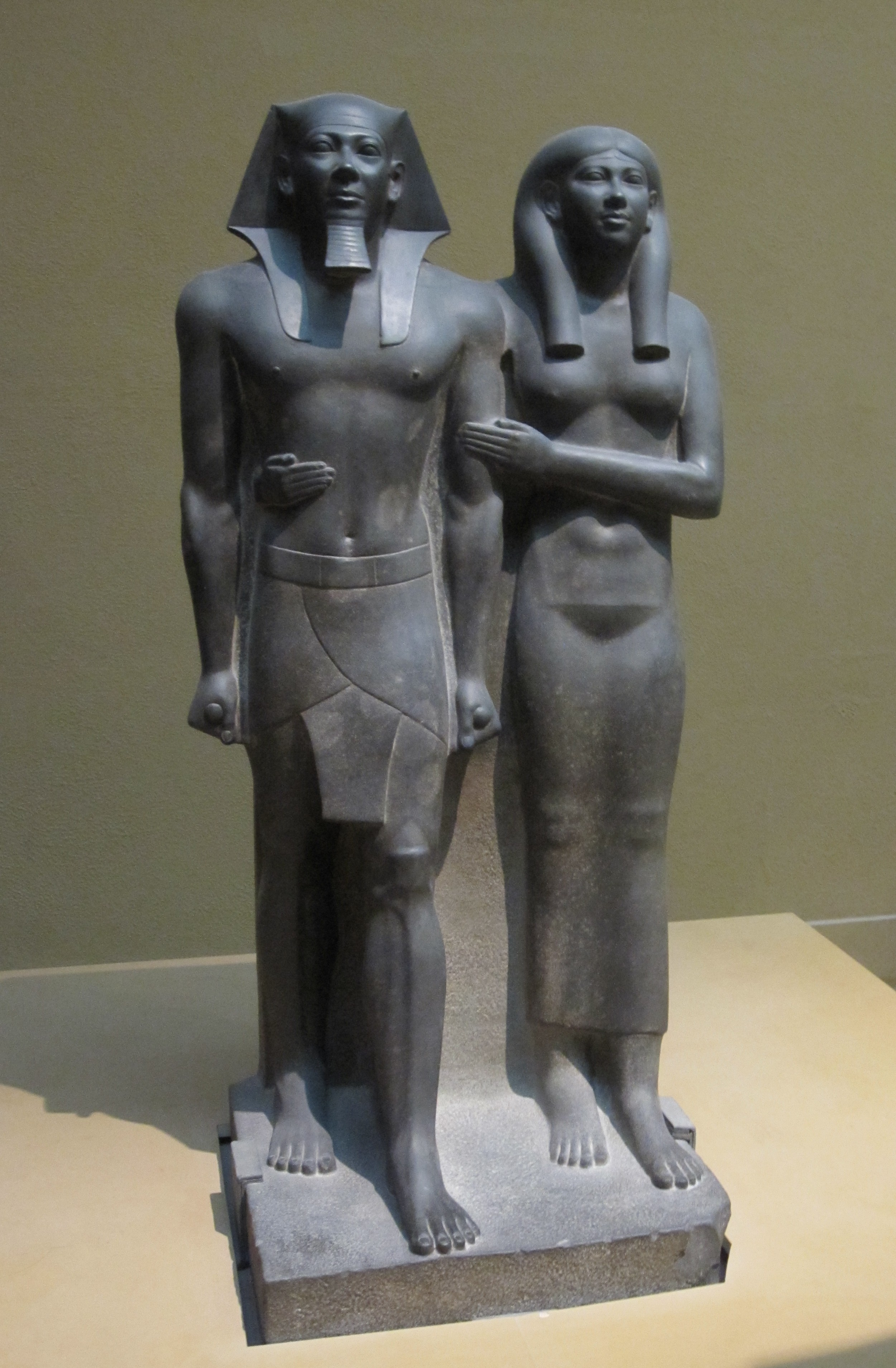
King Menkaura (Mycerinus) and queen, 2490–2472 BCE

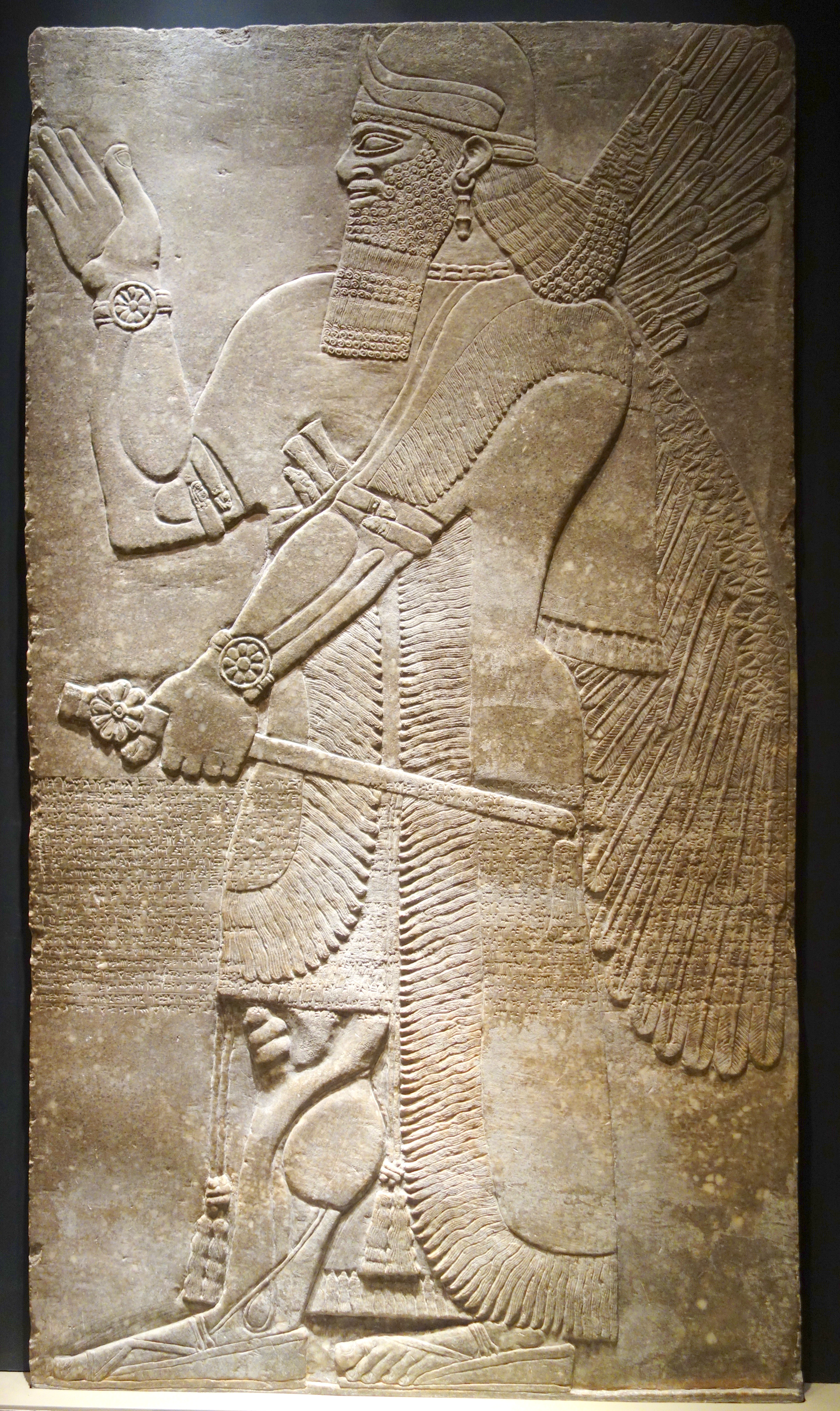
Winged Protective Deity, 883–859 BCE

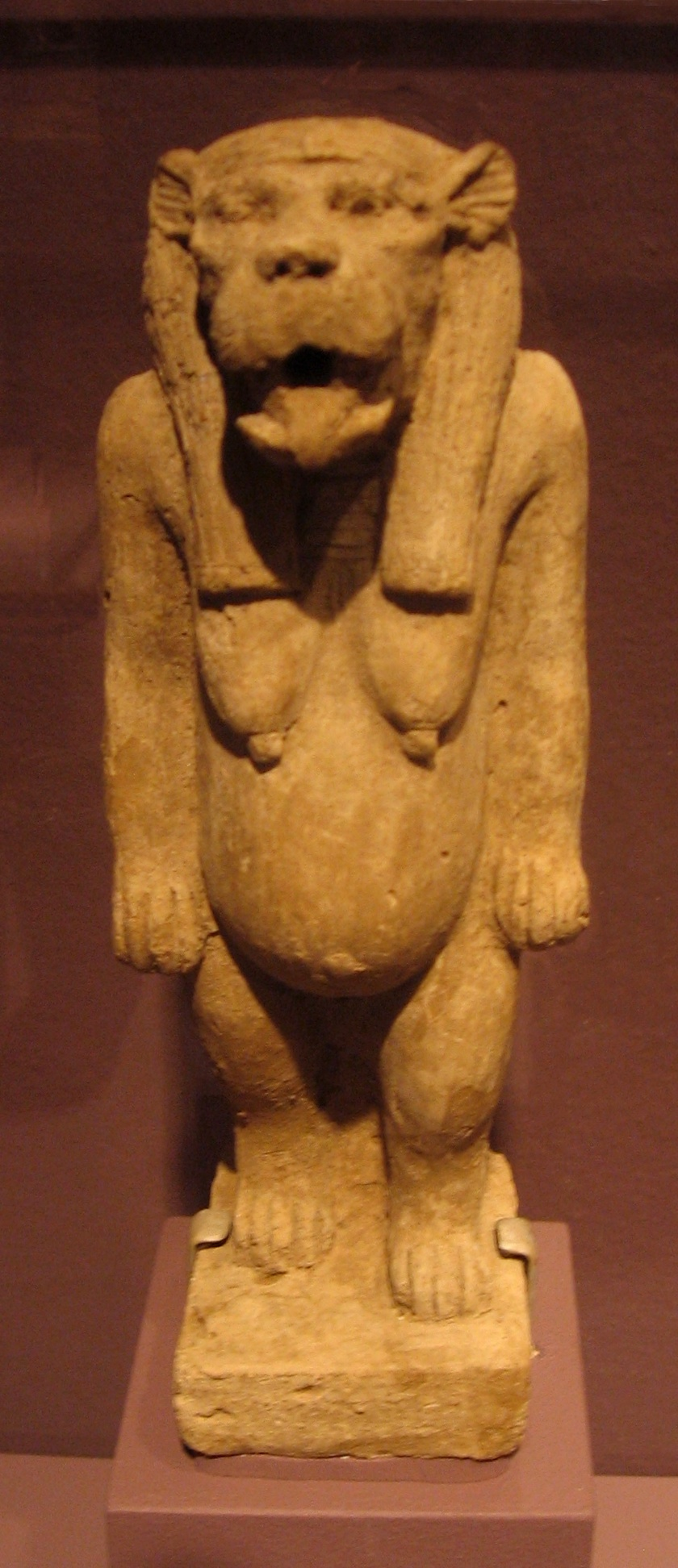
Goddess Tawaret, 623–595 BCE

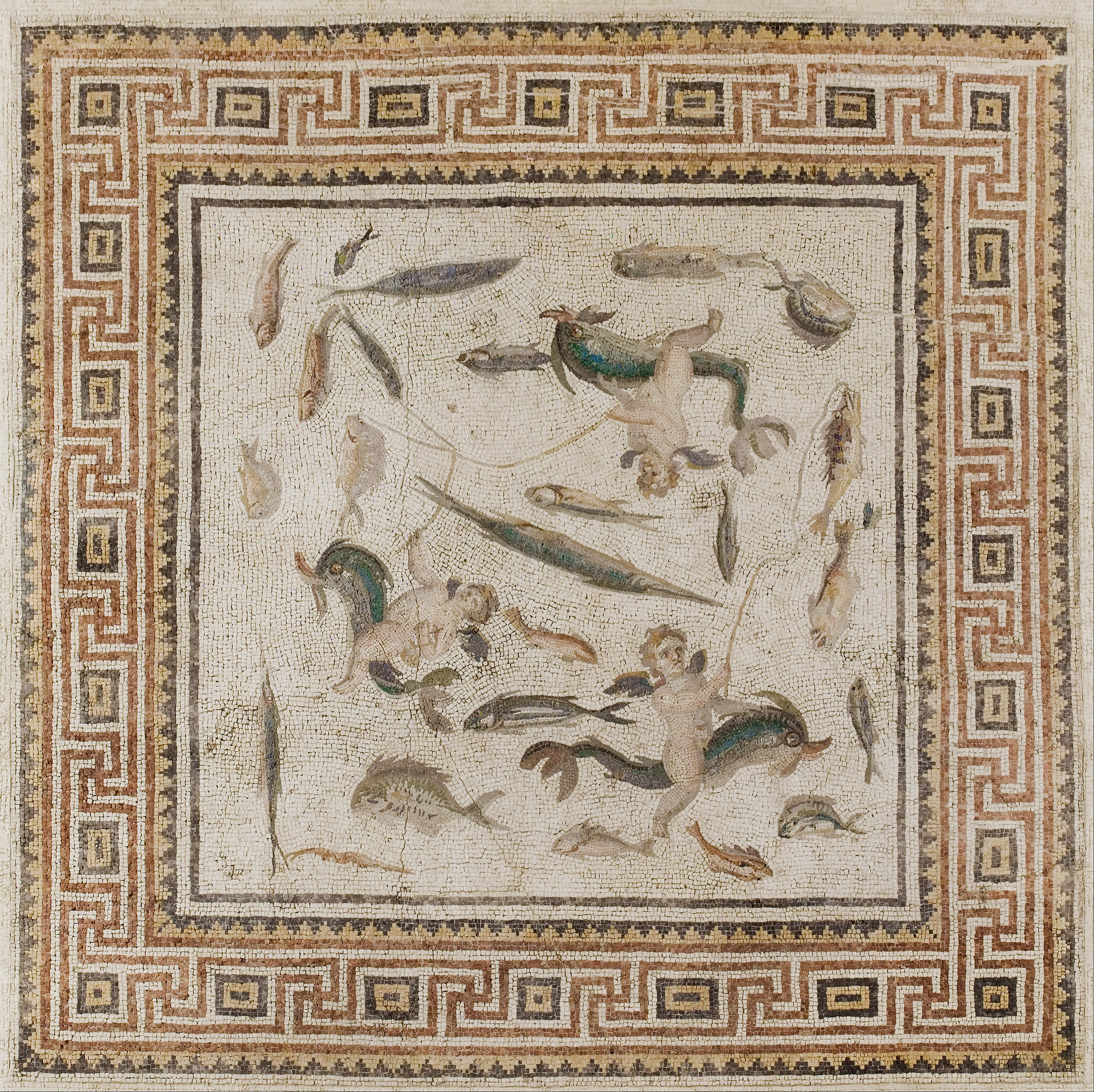
Marine Mosaic, 200–230 CE

== Notable people ==
=== Directors ===
- Charles Greely Loring (1876–1902)

Note: Loring's initial executive title was Curator; his title was changed to Director in 1887.

- Edward Robinson
- Arthur Fairbanks
- George Harold Edgell
- Perry T. Rathbone
- Merrill C. Rueppel
- Jan Fontein
- Alan Shestack (1985–1993)
- Morton Golden (interim; 1993–1994)
- Malcolm Rogers (1994–2015)
- Matthew Teitelbaum (2015–2025)
- Pierre Terjanian (2025-present)

=== Curators ===
- Sylvester Rosa Koehler – first Curator of Prints (1887–1900)
- Ernest Fenollosa – Curator of Oriental Art (1890–1896)
- Benjamin Ives Gilman – Curator (1893–1894?); Librarian (1893–1904); Secretary (1894–1925) Assistant Director (1901–1903); Temporary Director (1907)
- Albert Lythgoe – first Curator of Egyptian Art (1902–1906)
- Okakura Kakuzō – Curator of Oriental Art (1904–1913)
- Fitzroy Carrington – Curator of Prints (1912–1921)
- Ananda Coomaraswamy – Curator of Oriental Art (1917–1933)
- William George Constable – Curator of Paintings (1938–1957)
- Cornelius Clarkson Vermeule III – Curator of Classical Art (1957–1996)
- Jonathan Leo Fairbanks – Curator of American Decorative Arts and Sculpture (1970–1999)
- Theodore Stebbins – Curator of American Paintings (1977–1999)
- Anne Poulet – Curator of Sculpture and Decorative Arts (1979–1999)

== Bulletin ==
A bulletin appeared under various titles from 1903 to 1983:

- 1903–1925: Museum of Fine Arts Bulletin
- 1926–1965: Bulletin of the Museum of Fine Arts
- 1966–1977: Boston Museum Bulletin
- 1978–1980: MFA Bulletin
- 1981–1983: M Bulletin (Museum of Fine Arts, Boston)

== See also ==
- List of most-visited museums in the United States
- The Lonely Palette (art history podcast hosted by MFA lecturer Tamar Avishai)
- Nagoya/Boston Museum of Fine Arts (defunct sister institution in Nagoya, Japan)
- School of the Museum of Fine Arts at Tufts
