= Walter Yarwood =

Canadian abstract painter and sculptor (1917-1996)

- Born: Walter Hawley Yarwood; September 19, 1917; Toronto, Ontario
- Died: December 22, 1996 (aged 79); Hamilton, Ontario
- Education: Western Technical School
- Known for: Painter and Sculptor
- Movement: Painters Eleven
- Spouse: Helen Yarwood

Walter Yarwood (September 19, 1917 – December 22, 1996) was a Canadian abstract painter and a founding member of Painters Eleven. Yarwood became known for his painting beginning in the 1950s. During the 1960s he completed a number of public sculptures in Ontario, Quebec and Manitoba.

== Life and work ==
After completing his studies at Western Technical School, Yarwood worked full-time as a commercial artist while painting on weekends. During these early years, he joined the Ontario Society of Artists and the Canadian Group of Painters. In the late 1940s, he painted landscape, and in the 1950s he evolved to abstract expressionism, often with architectonic shapes or forms reflecting motion rather than the spontaneous splashes of painters such as Alexandra Luke. In 1952, he studied in Mexico and in 1953, joined Painters Eleven, the group with which he showed his abstract paintings until 1960. His work has a rich colour sense and sometimes it is compared by other members of the group such as Tom Hodgson with that of member Oscar Cahén.

By 1960, unhappy with his painting, he had turned to sculpture using found materials, then with metals such as welded steel, bronze, and cast aluminum, allowing him to create surface effects using acid. Between 1963 and 1967 he created numerous public sculptures, now installed in Toronto, Montreal and Winnipeg. An exhibition of his sculptures was shown at Hart House (now the Justina M. Barnicke Gallery, Art Museum, University of Toronto), in 1967.

Around 1970, he began teaching art and design at Humber College in Toronto.

In 1979, he moved to Port Rowan, near Lake Erie and started to paint again in watercolour and oil.

== Public artworks ==
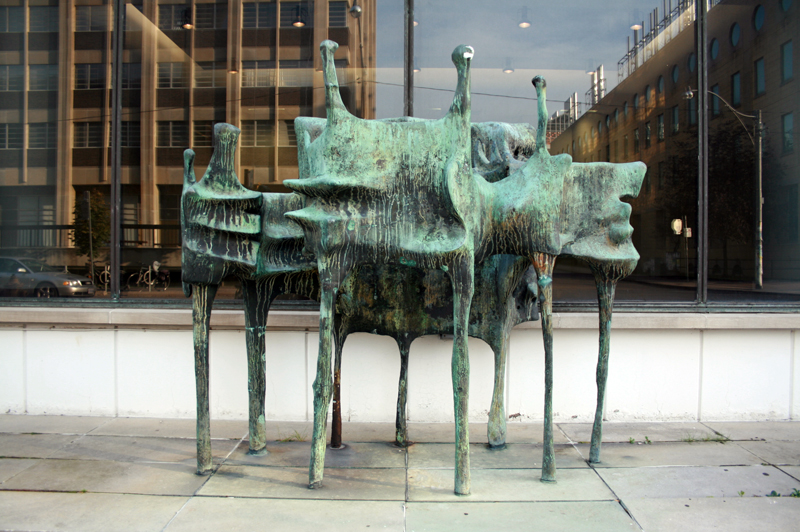
Cedars, bronze sculpture installed at the University of Toronto.

In 1963, Yarwood installed the nine-metre tall piece Totem at the Winnipeg Airport. Yarwood's 1967 work sans qualification, original commissioned by the distiller Seagrams for Expo 67, is installed at Université de Montréal's Place de la Laurentienne.

Five of Yarwood's public sculptures are installed in Toronto. The 1962 bronze sculpture Cedars is installed in front of the University of Toronto's pharmacy building at 19 Russel St. His 1964 work Horizons, also commissioned by the University of Toronto, is on the facade of Sidney Smith Hall. The 1964 work Coca Cola was commissioned by the Coca-Cola company. Originally installed at the company's 46 Overlea boulevard head office, it was moved in 2015 to the company's Brampton bottling plant, in 2021 it was unveiled in its new home in front of the Coco-Cola Coliseum, at Exhibition Place. His 1965 cast aluminum work The Crest is installed on the facade of Founders College at York University, North York. In 1968 he produced Pines, a large bronze work commissioned by the Government of Ontario and installed on the lawn of the Macdonald Block at 77 Wellesley Street West.

== Collections ==
- Art Gallery of Ontario, Toronto
- National Gallery of Canada, Ottawa
- Robert McLaughlin Gallery, Oshawa

== Bibliography ==
- Creative Canada: A Biographical Dictionary of Twentieth-century Creative and Performing Artists (Volume 2). December 15, 1972. ISBN 9781442637849.
- Bradfield, Helen (1970). Art Gallery of Ontario: the canadian collection. Toronto: McGraw-Hill Company. ISBN 0070925046. Archived from the original on 2023-08-02.
- Nasgaard, Roald (2008). Abstract Painting in Canada. Douglas & McIntyre. ISBN 978-1-55365-394-3.
- Nowell, Iris (2011). Painters Eleven:The Wild Ones of Canadian Art. Vancouver: Douglas & McIntyre. ISBN 9781553655909.
- Richards, Larry Wayne (2019). University of Toronto: An Architectural Tour (The Campus Guide) (2nd ed.). Chronicle Books. ISBN 9781616898243.
- Tippett, Maria (2017). "Sculpture in Canada: A History". Douglas & McIntyre. ISBN 9781771620949.
- Warkentin, John (2010). Creating Memory: A Guide to Outdoor Public Sculpture in Toronto. Becker Associates. ISBN 9780919387607.
