= Oscar Cahén =

Canadian painter (1916–1956)

- Born: Oscar Cahén; February 8, 1916; Copenhagen, Denmark.
- Died: 1956; Oakville, Ontario
- Education: Dresden Academy of Fine Arts
- Known for: Painter, illustrator
- Movement: Painters Eleven
- Spouse: Mimi Levinson (m. 1943)
- Parent(s): Fritz Max Cahén & Eugenie Caroline Auguste Stamm

Oscar Cahén (sometimes spelled Oscar Cahen) (February 8, 1916 – November 26, 1956) was a Canadian painter and illustrator. Cahén is best known as a member of Painters Eleven, a group of abstract artists active in Toronto from 1953-1960, and for his fifteen years of work as an illustrator for Canadian magazines.

== Early years ==
Cahén was born in Copenhagen, Denmark. His parents were Eugenie Caroline Auguste Stamm and Fritz Max Cahén, a well known anti-Nazi activist. Cahén was trained in Europe at the Dresden Academy of Fine Arts from March 1932 to August 1933 in the academy studio of Max Frey. In 1938 he taught in Prague at the Rotter-Schule für Werbegrafik before escaping the Nazi occupation by traveling to England in 1939. He worked as an editorial illustrator during the war and began painting, moving to abstract works that were described at the time as expressing modern life. Considered German by the British, he was interned in Britain and sent to Canada in 1940 as an enemy alien with other Europeans of Jewish descent.

His artistic contacts in Canada secured his release in October 1942, and he worked in Montréal at advertising firm Rapid, Grip and Batten before moving to Toronto in late 1944 to become art editor for Magazine Digest. Cahén subsequently worked as a freelance illustrator for magazines such as Maclean's, Chatelaine and New Liberty. As an illustrator, Cahén won five medals and six awards of merit from the Toronto Art Directors Club, 1949–1957.

== Painters Eleven ==
In the late 1940s he met Walter Yarwood, Harold Town and others involved in avant-garde art in Toronto, and Cahén was included in the Abstracts at Home display held in 1953 at the Robert Simpson Company, Toronto. He formed Painters Eleven with ten other abstract painters (most of whom had also been in the Abstracts At Home event) soon after. In Canada's conservative art world their early exhibitions were met with disdain. Nevertheless, Painters Eleven attracted U.S. exposure with a successful exhibition, Twentieth Annual Exhibition of American Abstract Artists with 'Painters Eleven' of Canada in 1956, with the American Abstract Artists at the Riverside Museum in New York, and were praised by the influential critic Clement Greenberg on a visit he paid to the group in Toronto in 1957. In the Canadian press, the group's most ardent supporter was art critic Robert Fulford. Cahén was killed in a car accident in Oakville, Ontario in 1956 and the group formally disbanded in 1960.

== Painting Technique and Colour Sense ==
Cahén had an unusual ability to move from one medium to another and from representational to abstract idioms with equal success. Perhaps his most original contribution was a technique he called “monoetching,” which involved applying a thin layer of wax to an illustration board which he then scratched through with a needle. He would then apply a water-based pigment overtop which would seep through the scratches into the exposed board beneath. However, more than any other of his talents, Cahén is probably best remembered today for his colour sense, as his best known works often combined orange and pink along with reds, blues and greens.

== Awards ==
- 1975 Royal Canadian Academy of Arts Medal.

== Legacy ==
In 2026, the Robert McLaughlin Gallery in Oshawa organized Stories in Ink: Illustrations by Oscar Cahén.
