= Alma Duncan =

Canadian painter, artist, filmmaker

- Born: October 2, 1917; Paris, Ontario, Canada
- Died: December 15, 2004 (aged 86); Ottawa, Ontario, Canada
- Partner: Audrey McLaren
- Awards: BAFTA (British Academy Film Awards) (1954)

Alma Mary Duncan (October 2, 1917 – December 15, 2004) was a Canadian painter, graphic artist, and filmmaker from Paris, Ontario. A prolific artist working in a variety of mediums including charcoal, chalk pastel, ink, watercolour, oil paint, puppetry, and film, Duncan's style evolved drastically over the course of her career to include portraiture, precise representational drawings, machine aesthetic, and abstraction.

== Early life ==
Alma Duncan was born in the southern Ontario town of Paris, but attended high school in Hamilton, Ontario and Montreal, Quebec. Her father, John Duncan, was a textile-firm engineer, exposing Alma to textile factories and influencing her interest in pattern and combinations of realism and abstraction in her later artwork. Though largely self-taught as an artist, she studied with Canadian painter Adam Sherriff Scott as a teenager. Duncan made use of her drawing skills at a commercial art studio from 1936 to 1943, where she drew products for mail-order catalogues, revealing the precision that would show up in other work such as her anatomical drawings at McGill University, where she studied Political Economy.

Duncan continued to take life-drawing and portraiture courses in this early stage of her career with Ernst Neumann at the Roberts-Neumann School of Art, which was located in the same building as the commercial art studio, as well as with Goodridge Roberts at the Art Association of Montreal. During this period, Duncan exhibited her artwork regularly at the spring exhibitions at the Art Association of Montreal. In 1941, Alma joined other prominent Montreal artists on the executive of the Quebec branch of the Federation of Canadian Artists (FCA), and attended their first meeting in Kingston, Ontario at Queen's University with 150 artists, curators, and members of the arts community.

== War work ==
In 1943, the same year she served as treasurer of the Writers', Artists' and Broadcasters' War Council in Montreal, Duncan obtained permission to document the lives of war workers and the members of the Canadian Women's Army Corps with her sketches. Several of these pieces are now held by the Canadian War Museum in its Beaverbrook Collection of War Art. These drawings of machinery sparked Alma's ongoing interest in industrial subject matter, even inspiring her to take leave to draw industrial subjects around Ontario in 1947, while she was working in the animation department at the National Film Board.

== Film work ==
In 1943, the National Film Board of Canada invited Montreal-based Duncan to join its Graphics Division. She worked first with the Information Display department, designing posters, publications, and travelling displays for National Film Board projects. She moved to the NFB's Animation Department when the Graphics Division was disbanded and produced her first film, Folksong Fantasy (shown at the 1951 Edinburgh International Film Festival) while under contract with the NFB as an independent producer. In 1951, Alma Duncan and her longtime partner, photographer Audrey McLaren, formed the film company Dunclaren Productions. Their first film, Kumak the Sleepy Hunter (1953) was a retelling of an Inuit legend using puppets and a stop-motion animation technique. It was nominated for a BAFTA award in 1954 as a documentary film. They produced two other films, Hearts and Soles (1955), which used the same animation techniques as Kumak, and Friendly Interchange (1959), which was made with chalk drawings.

Though the production company never disbanded, it became inactive after 1960. Duncan retired from animated filmmaking in 1960 to allow herself to concentrate on her drawings and paintings, which became increasingly abstract despite taking inspiration from her natural surroundings.

== Mid-career ==
Duncan began experimenting with abstraction in the 1960s, with her Woman Series which deconstructed the female figure through circular forms. Works from this series appeared in the exhibition Canadian Water Colours, Drawings and Prints 1966 at the National Gallery of Canada and then circulated across Canada, as well as appearing in international exhibitions and collections such as the Brooklyn Museum, the Canada Council Art Bank, and Museum London. Her work coincided with and reflects the sexual liberation of second wave feminism, though she did not explicitly identify as a feminist at the time. Duncan's earlier painting Self-Portrait (1943) also embodies a feminist outlook, according to art historian Jaclyn Meloche, as her depiction of herself as a young and confident working artist defied prevailing gender norms. Duncan produced her "dot" series of pen-and-ink drawings of celestial bodies using simple circular forms the same year as her Woman Series. In 1966, amid her exploration of abstraction, Duncan joined the Canadian Society of Graphic Art.

Duncan was particularly fascinated by the works of Painters Eleven as well as the Abstract Expressionists, both influencing her abstract works, seen in her 1967 series of paintings expressing pure colour and form.

== Canada Post ==
In 1970, Canada Post commissioned Alma Duncan to design stamps. She produced the series Maple Leaf in Four Seasons (released in 1971) and the series Floral Aerogrammes (released in 1973). Her "Autumn" stamp from the Maple Leaf in Four Seasons series was selected as the stamp of the month by the Scott Monthly Journal, a periodical from the creators of the Scott catalogue that commented on stamps worldwide.

== Later life ==
From 1960 until her death, most of Alma Duncan's time was devoted to her painting and drawing, much of it done on location near her home outside of Cumberland, Ontario. She and her partner, Audrey McLaren, regularly hosted social gatherings that brought together members of Ottawa's artistic community. Duncan maintained her interests in both industrial subjects (which began during her World War II project and resulted in a traveling retrospective of her industrial and more up-to-date drawings and pastels in 1987, created by the Robert McLaughlin Gallery in Oshawa, Ontario), and the Canadian North (spending two months in 1975 on a sketching trip to Baffin and Ellesmere Islands). Duncan became a board member of ATAI Arctic Creative Development Foundation in 1974, joined the Print and Drawing Council of Canada in 1976, and joined the Canadian Artists' Representation in 1978.

Duncan also taught at various points in her career including teaching the course "Visual Presentation of Ideas" at Laval University and at Macdonald College in Quebec, lectures on "The Art of Animation" at the Advertising Club in Montreal and later to the National Gallery Association, a three-year teaching position in painting and drawing at the Ottawa Municipal Art Centre (now the Ottawa School of Art), painting and drawing courses at the Rockcliffe Public School Art Club, and a lecture on "The Art of Collage" to the National Gallery Association. Among her pupils was the printmaker Betty Davison.

Alma died on December 15, 2004, after living with Alzheimer's disease for nearly ten years.

== Awards ==
- British Academy Film Awards;

== Legacy ==
In 2014, Catherine Sinclair and Jaclyn Meloche curated the exhibition Alma: The Life and Art of Alma Duncan (1917-2004) for the Ottawa Art Gallery and Judith & Alix Norman Art Gallery in Sarnia, Ontario.

The Ottawa Art Gallery has named the Alma Duncan Salon in her honour.
