= Ray Mead =

Canadian painter (1921–1998)

- Born: Raymond John Mead; September 22, 1921; Watford, England
- Died: September 5, 1998 (aged 77); Toronto, Ontario
- Education: Slade School of Art (1937–1939)
- Known for: Painter, art director
- Movement: Painters Eleven
- Spouse(s): Mary Phyllis Lockett and after her death, Carolynn Lund (m. 1987)

Ray Mead (1921–1998) was a Canadian abstract expressionist painter and a member of the artists group known as Painters Eleven. In his work, he often used a high horizon line as a structural element.

== Early life and career ==
Born in Watford, United Kingdom, Mead studied under John Nash and Randolph Schwab at the Slade School of Art in London, graduating in 1939. During World War II, he moved to New York where he trained American pilots in combat flying. Sometime around 1943, he went to New York and first saw American abstraction in the work of Stuart Davis.

In 1946, he moved to Hamilton, Ontario, where he befriended Hortense Gordon, who with him became a member of Painters Eleven. Later, in Toronto, he worked for MacLaren Advertising Co. as art director. In 1958, Mead moved to Montreal to work at the MacLaren's branch there, and became associated, through the dealer of his Montreal gallery, Denyse Delrue, with Quebec abstract artists such as Guido Molinari and Claude Tousignant who also showed their work with her. These artists had an influence on him, as did Robert Motherwell. Due to Delrue and the artists who showed their work with her, Mead became a member of The Non-Figurative Artists' Association of Montreal and exhibited his work in the circulating exhibition sponsored by the National Gallery of Canada, in 1960–1961.

Mead's finely-tuned work has been called "a dry-martini sort of art". William Ronald put it this way, of Mead's work:

"Ray was the most intellectual of the 11 of us".

Mead uses colour adroitly. For him, discovery was central - he tries to put his "accidents" to work.

Having returned to Toronto in 1987, he worked continuously until his death in 1998 in Toronto. A posthumous retrospective of his work was held at the Howard Scott Gallery in New York City in 1998. Ray Mead: A Survey - Five Decades of Work was held in 2014 at Christopher Cutts Gallery in Toronto.

== Selected public collections ==
- Art Gallery of Guelph;
- Art Gallery of Hamilton;
- Art Gallery of Ontario;
- Glenbow Museum;
- Musée d'art contemporain de Montréal;
- National Gallery of Canada;
- Robert McLaughlin Gallery;
- Winnipeg Art Gallery;

== Painters Eleven ==
In 1949, Mead met Hortense Gordon in Hamilton and he was included in the Abstracts at Home exhibition held in 1953 at the Robert Simpson Company, Toronto. He joined Painters Eleven when the group was formed later that year. In Canada's conservative art world their early exhibitions were met with disdain. Nevertheless, Painters Eleven attracted U.S. exposure with a successful exhibition in 1956, Twentieth Annual Exhibition of American Abstract Artists with 'Painters Eleven' of Canada, with the American Abstract Artists at the Riverside Museum in New York City, and were praised by the influential critic Clement Greenberg on a visit he paid to Toronto in 1957. In the Canadian press, the group's most ardent supporter was art critic Robert Fulford. The group formally disbanded in 1960.
