= Albert Franck =

Canadian artist

- Born: Albert Jacques Franck; April 2, 1899; Middelburg, Zeeland, Netherlands
- Died: February 28, 1973 (aged 73); Toronto, Ontario, Canada
- Education: self-trained
- Spouse: Florence Vale

Albert Jacques Franck (2 April 1899 – 28 February 1973) was a Canadian artist. He is known for his realistic paintings of Toronto winter scenes, dilapidated neighbourhoods and back lanes. His detailed paintings provide a historical record of conditions in some of Toronto's once less affluent neighbourhoods. "He was unknowingly the first Toronto house nationalist," said Harold Town.

== Early life ==
Franck was born at Middelburg, the Netherlands. As a young man he was a champion swimmer. He moved to Canada in 1926, making his living as a swimming instructor and by working in factories He later worked in an art gallery and sold picture frames.

== Career ==
Franck opened a studio in his small home on Gerrard Street in Toronto. He began by hanging some of his paintings in a local restaurant, and in this way his work became locally known. In the 1950s he and his wife, artist Florence Vale, developed the studio into a gathering place for the arts community. They hosted and supported the work of many young local artists, particularly those participating in the emerging Toronto abstract art scene, including Joyce Wieland and Kazuo Nakamura. Franck and Vale later moved to a larger home, which also served as their studio and gallery, on Hazelton Street as part of a general migration of the art community to the Yorkville area during the 1960s.

Franck's first exhibition was presented at York University in 1963. In 1973, he held an exhibition at the Art Gallery of Ontario. Franck also participated in a number of group exhibitions.

Franck's paintings are in the collections of the Art Gallery of Ontario, the Museum London, the National Exhibition Centre in St. Catharines, the New Brunswick Museum, and McMaster University Art Gallery.

He was an Associate member of the Royal Canadian Academy (1961-1970), and a member of the Ontario Society of Artists (1958), the Canadian Society of Painters in Water Colour, and the Canadian Society of Graphic Art.

Fellow artist Harold Town, a close friend, wrote two books celebrating Franck's art.

Franck also taught art in a local high school and played the cello. He and his wife sent small pieces of their art as greeting cards to friends and relatives, and some of these have survived.

Franck died in Toronto on February 28, 1973. A street in the St. Lawrence Neighbourhood of Toronto is named for him.
