= Florence Vale =

Canadian artist

- Born: April 18, 1909; Ilford, Essex, England
- Died: July 23, 2003 (aged 94); Toronto, Ontario, Canada
- Spouse: Albert Franck

Florence Vale (April 18, 1909 - July 23, 2003) was a Canadian artist influenced by Surrealism, Cubism, Expressionism, and the works of Paul Klee. "I paint what I dream", wrote Vale.

== Early life and education ==
Vale was born in Ilford, then part of Essex, England. She emigrated to Toronto with her family when she was two years old. A piano-maker and musician, Florence's father taught her to play piano at a young age and entertained the family with toys and puzzles he created. Florence's mother was a music-hall musician. Vale had no formal art training; her formal schooling ended at the age of eleven with grade seven, after which she held a series of jobs in Toronto's garment district. When she was eighteen she met Dutch-born artist Albert Franck, a swimming instructor at the Oakwood pool who was teaching her brothers to dive. They were married two years later and had two children, Trudy (who died as an infant) and Anneke.

== Career ==
Vale was introduced to the world of visual art by her husband, Albert Franck, who painted views of Toronto backyards and houses. In the late 1940s, Vale began to experiment with her husband's paints and brushes. In contrast to Franck's paintings of urban scenes, Vale's subjects were often imaginative and even imaginary. She used ideas from Surrealism to create a private art, one that offered dreams and memories combined with well-observed vision.

Together, Franck and Vale were a part of the Gerrard Street bohemian circle and their Victorian home on Hazelton Avenue in Toronto became a centre for young artists, CBC personalities, writers, musicians, and critics. Vale was thus exposed to a wide variety of artistic inspirations.

After Franck's death in 1973, Vale continued to create oil paintings, collages, and ink drawings, and also included her own poetry in some of her works. Many of her works, most prominently after the death of her husband, were erotic, while still viewed by critics as keeping a whimsical, innocent tone. A series of her drawings was published as The Amorous Unicorn, a book of mostly erotic poetry. Her art appeared in exhibitions in Ontario, Quebec, and New York City, U.S.A. She was represented by the Gadatsy Gallery in Toronto and Julie and Stephen Gadacsy were among her most devoted friends. They helped organize a major retrospective of her work, The Art of Florence Vale curated by Joan Murray at the Art Gallery of Peel in Brampton, Ontario in 2010.

Vale's small 1965 pen and ink drawing Pyramid of Roses was the inspiration for Harold Town's series of Vale Variations as well as Christopher Chapman and Gordon McLennan's short film celebrating both Town's Variations and the original Vale drawing.

Vale died on July 23, 2003, in Toronto, Ontario, Canada. Her fonds is in the Edward P. Taylor Library & Archives, Art Gallery of Ontario.
