= Betty Davison =

Canadian painter and printmaker (1909-2000)

- Born: Gertrude Elizabeth Mary Young; 1909; Ottawa, Ontario
- Died: 2000 (aged 90–91); Ottawa
- Education: Ottawa Municipal Art Centre (1962, 1972-1974)
- Spouses: Richard Lewis (m. 1939) Arthur Davison (m. 1954)

Betty Davison (née Gertrude Elizabeth Mary Young) (1909–2000) was a Canadian painter and printmaker known especially known for her representational cast relief prints.

== Career ==
Davison (1909–2000) was born in Ottawa. She studied life drawing and sculpture at the High School of Commerce with Lionel Fosbery and Ernest Fosbery; with Alma Duncan at the Ottawa Municipal Art Centre (1962); with Duncan de Kergommeaux at Carleton University, Ottawa (1968–1969); and with James Boyd, Hilde Schreier, and Victor Tolgesy at the Ottawa Municipal Art Centre again (1972–1974). She credited Alma Duncan with encouraging her to return to her artistic career.

Her studies in printmaking with Hilde Schreier during the 1970s led Davison to experiment with the creation of cast paper reliefs, and it is in this medium that she found success. Her 1974 print Paper Roses received a $1,000 purchase award from the Ontario Arts Council (1974). Her awards and grants include the Martha Jackson Gallery, New York, purchase award (1977); purchase award, 6th International Miniature Print Competition (1977); Reid Memorial Award, Print, and Drawing Council of Canada (P&DCC), Calgary (1977); the Harold Pitman prize (1978); and a purchase award from the Glenhyrst Art Gallery of Brant in 1983 and others.

She also danced and acted with the Ottawa Little Theatre, through the 1930s and 1940s when she was also frequently photographed by Yousuf Karsh. She held her first solo exhibition in the theatre's foyer in 1945. Her solo and two-artist shows include: Robertson Galleries, Ottawa (1970); Gallery Graphics, Ottawa (2-artist, 1977) and others. Her important group shows include: Graphex 4, Art Gallery of Brantford (1976); 6th Intl. Miniature Print Exhibition, Pratt Graphic Institute, NYC (1977); Graphex 5, Art Gallery of Brantford (1977).

Her work is represented in many public collections, such as the Art Gallery of Ontario; the National Gallery of Canada, and others. She was a member of the Print and Drawing Council of Canada and of Canadian Artists' Representation.

== Personal life ==
Davison married Richard Lewis in 1939; he died three years later and Davison in order to support her family took portrait commissions as well as working as a stenographer at the Department of External Affairs. In 1952, she married the architect Arthur Davison, a fellow actor at the Ottawa Little Theatre.

Davison died in Ottawa.
