= Robert Fulford (journalist) =

Canadian writer (1932–2024)

Robert Fulford OC
- Fulford in 1955
- Born: Robert Marshall Blount Fulford; February 13, 1932; Ottawa, Ontario, Canada
- Died: October 15, 2024 (aged 92); Toronto, Ontario, Canada
- Other name: Marshall Delaney
- Occupations: Journalist, magazine editor, columnist, essayist
- Spouses: Jocelyn Jean Dingman (m. 1956; div. 1970) Geraldine Sherman (m. 1970)
- Children: 4
- Relatives: Stephen Marche (son-in-law), Jeff Rosenthal (son-in-law), Marcus Gee (nephew)

Robert Marshall Blount Fulford OC (February 13, 1932 – October 15, 2024) was a Canadian journalist, magazine editor, essayist, and public intellectual. He lived in Toronto, Ontario.

== Background ==
Fulford was born on February 13, 1932, in Ottawa, Ontario, the third of four children, to Frances (Blount) Fulford and A. E. Fulford, a journalist and editor at Canadian Press, who later covered the Dionne quintuplets and the 1939 royal tour of Canada of King George VI and Queen Elizabeth. He grew up in The Beaches neighbourhood in Toronto and was a childhood friend of Glenn Gould, who was his next door neighbour. In 1952, he and Gould founded New Music Associates, which produced and promoted Gould's first three public performances, including Gould's debut performance of Bach's Goldberg Variations. He attended Malvern Collegiate Institute and struggled academically due to undiagnosed Attention Deficit Disorder.

Fulford met his first wife, writer Jocelyn Jean Dingman Fulford (1930–1976), while they were both working at the Globe and Mail. They married in 1956 and had two children, Margaret and James. Margaret Fulford is the University College Librarian at the University of Toronto and is married to Professor Jeffrey Rosenthal. Fulford and Dingman divorced in 1970.

Fulford's second wife was writer and former CBC Radio producer Geraldine Sherman, whom he met while working on the radio show This Is Robert Fulford on CBC. They were married in 1970 and had two children, Sarah and Rachel. Sarah Fulford became editor-in-chief of Maclean's magazine in February 2022, after serving as editor-in-chief of Toronto Life magazine for 14 years, and is married to writer Stephen Marche. Rachel Fulford is a psychotherapist and former film and television producer who was director of original production at Showcase.

Fulford suffered a stroke in 2008, in his late seventies, but was able to continue his writing career. He retired his column in the National Post in 2019. His last published work was A Life in Paragraphs, a collection of essays published in 2020. He had vascular dementia for five years leading up to his death on October 15, 2024, at the age of 92 at Meighen Manor, a long-term care facility in Toronto where he had lived for three years.

== Career ==
Fulford's media career began at the age of 16, while still in high school, when he worked for Toronto radio station CHUM reporting on high school sports and producing a weekly radio show for teenagers.

Through his father's connections, he began working for the Globe and Mail as a part-time copy boy while in high school. In the summer of 1950, Fulford dropped out of high school to work for the newspaper full-time as a sports reporter, despite the fact that later in his memoir, he wrote that of his disdain for sports and that he "didn't like to watch people play games." His son-in-law, Stephen Marche observed "the one thing that did not interest him in this world was sports – and yet he wrote fluently and enthusiastically." His nephew, Marcus Gee, recalled that Fulford having worked as a sports journalist was "a fact that the family always viewed as hilarious given his complete and utter indifference to sports later on."

Two years later, he became a general assignment reporter at the Globe and Mail.

In 1954, Fulford moved to Maclean-Hunter, a magazine publisher, where he wrote for Canadian Homes and Gardens and Mayfair magazine, for which he was also assistant editor. He also wrote on jazz for the Globe and Mail and as the freelance Toronto correspondent for DownBeat magazine. Moving to The Toronto Star, he became literary editor and a daily arts columnist (1959–1962). From 1963 to 1964 he was a columnist and editor of the Reviews section at Maclean's magazine before returning to the Star (1964–1968). He also served on the editorial board of Canadian Forum. He covered Expo 67 for the newspaper and wrote a book on the world's fair, This Was Expo.

From 1968 until 1987, Fulford was the editor of Saturday Night magazine and also wrote both a general column for the magazine under his own name, and, from 1965 until 1987, film reviews under the pseudonym "Marshall Delaney". Under his stewardship, Saturday Night won five gold medals at the National Magazine Awards. While editor of Saturday Night he also wrote a weekly arts column for the Star (1971–1987). He then wrote weekly columns for the Financial Times of Canada (1988–1992), The Globe and Mail (1992–1999) and the National Post (1999–2019).

Fulford was critical of David Cronenberg's films and the usage of funding from the Canadian Film Development Corporation (now Telefilm Canada) and wrote the article You Ought To Know How Bad This Film Is Because You Paid For It. Michael Spencer, the head of the CFDC, contacted Cronenberg about Fulford and Cronenberg stated that "only 100 people read Saturday Night magazine", but Spencer replied "Yes but it's the wrong hundred people".

On CBC Radio, he hosted two weekly programs, The Arts This Week from 1965 to 1967 and then This Is Robert Fulford from 1967 to 1972, where he met his second wife, who originally produced the program. In 1999, he delivered that year's Massey Lecture, "The Triumph of Narrative: Storytelling in the Age of Mass Culture" in a series of five programs aired on Ideas.

Fulford worked as the co-host with Richard Gwyn of Realities, a long-form interview show on TVOntario (1982–1989) and as a regular panelist on CBC Radio's Morningside (1989–1993).

He contributed longer essays to the Queen's Quarterly from 1991 to 2014, winning a National Magazine Award for his essay "Those Imbecilic, Stultifying Games: Notes on the Age of Sports" in 2006. He was also a frequent contributor to Toronto Life and Canadian Art magazines.

In his 1988 entry for The Canadian Encyclopedia, Douglas Fetherling described Fulford's politics as being on "the more conservative end of the liberal spectrum".

Fulford was also a critic of literature, art and films. He wrote extensively about the Canadian abstract art group Painters Eleven, its members (particularly William Ronald, Tom Hodgson, and Harold Town), and the Saskatchewan abstract artist Mashel Teitelbaum.

=== Honours ===
In 1984, Fulford was invested an Officer of the Order of Canada (OC).

He received the Queen Elizabeth II Golden Jubilee Medal and Queen Elizabeth II Diamond Jubilee Medal in 2002 and 2012, respectively. In his career, Fulford won a total of 17 National Magazine Awards, including 14 Gold and 3 Silver awards as well as the Foundation Award for Outstanding Achievement. Other awards he received include the Diplôme d'honneur from the Canadian Conference of the Arts (1981), the Tom Fairley Award for book editing from the Editors' Association of Canada (1989), and the Quill Award from the Press Club of Windsor (1989). He was inducted to the Canadian News Hall of Fame in 1990, received the Lifetime Achievement Award from the Canadian Journalism Foundation in 1996 and the Kilbourn Award from the Toronto Arts Foundation in 1997.

== Selected bibliography ==
- This Was Expo – 1968
- Remember Expo: A Pictorial Record – 1968
- Crisis at the Victory Burlesk: Culture, Politics and Other Diversions – 1968
- Harold Town Drawings - 1968 (editor)
- Read Canadian: A Book about Canadian Books – 1972 (co-editor with Dave Godfrey and Abraham Rotstein)
- Marshall Delaney at the Movies – 1974
- An Introduction to the Arts in Canada – 1977
- The Fulford File – 1978
- The Beginning of Vision: The Drawings of Lawren S. Harris – 1982 (co-author with Joan Murray)
- Canada: A Celebration – 1983
- Best Seat in the House: Memoirs of a Lucky Man – 1988
- Accidental City: The Transformation of Toronto – 1995
- Toronto Discovered – 1998
- The Triumph of Narrative: Storytelling in the Age of Mass Culture – 1999
- A Life in Paragraphs: Essays – 2020

== See also ==
- List of newspaper columnists

== Works cited ==
- Cronenberg, David (2006). David Cronenberg: Interviews with Serge Grünberg. Plexus Publishing. ISBN 0859653765.
