= Alexandra Luke =

Canadian artist (1901–1967)

- Born: Margaret Alexandra Luke; May 14, 1901; Montreal, Quebec
- Died: June 1, 1967 (aged 66); Oshawa, Ontario
- Education: Banff School of Fine Arts
- Known for: abstract painter, member of Painters Eleven
- Spouse(s): Marcus Everett Smith (m. 1925, d. 1926); Clarence Ewart McLaughlin (m. 1929)

Alexandra Luke (14 May 1901 – 1 June 1967), was a Canadian abstract artist who belonged to the Painters Eleven.

== Early life ==
Luke was born "Margaret Alexandra Luke" in Montreal, Quebec. She was one of a pair of twins, born to parents Jesse Herbert Ritson Luke and Emma Russell Long. Shortly after, the family returned to Oshawa, Ontario where the family had their roots in the community. After finishing high school in 1914, both Margaret and her twin sister Isobel began nurse's training at Columbia Hospital for Women in Washington, D.C.

After her graduation, Luke returned to Oshawa and married Marcus Everett Smith. Their marriage was short lived, as Smith died suddenly four months into their marriage, but Luke gave birth to his son, Richard, in 1926. Soon after, she was courted by Clarence Ewart McLaughlin, son of George W. McLaughlin and grandson of Robert McLaughlin, the founder of the McLaughlin Carriage Company. The couple married in 1928 and had a child, Mary, in 1930.

== Work and Painters Eleven ==
Luke began to create art in her late 20s. Inspired by two local artists, Dorothy Van Luven and Dorothy Henderson, she began to paint and organize arts classes around the city. She helped build the arts community in Oshawa and became a member of several boards and societies, including the Oshawa Women's Lyceum Club, the Oshawa Skating Club and Oshawa Historical Society.

Luke painted landscapes in a large, third floor studio at Greenbriar, their home, and soon discovered abstract art. After visiting modernist exhibitions in Toronto and Ottawa, she was desperate to be seen as more than a hobbyist painter. She sought a portfolio review by Caven Atkins to help her in 1944. Atkins spoke to her bluntly and told her that her Group of Seven-inspired style was not viable. This pushed her to further explore abstraction and receive formal art training at the Banff School of Fine Arts (renamed Banff Centre) in 1945, then at the Hans Hofmann School of Fine Arts (1947–1952). From Hofmann's teachings, she began to understand how to create energy in her paintings with colour, texture and the use of white space as well as formal structure. In Banff she was encouraged by A.Y.Jackson, who opened some doors for her. In turn she helped other artists including William Ronald attend Hofmann's Provincetown summer classes.

She began to exhibit her work in the early 1950s at different venues, including the Canadian Group of Painters and the Picture Loan Society. In 1952, she organized the first Canadian Abstract Exhibition, where she met many of the members that would form the Painters Eleven. With this group, she was inspired to create more paintings, and she was able to showcase her works in a wide range of venues in the United States and Canada. She championed the promotion of Canadian abstract art and had a "strengthening, inspirational" role in the group.

In the Canadian Abstract Exhibition catalogue, she wrote:

"...more beauty and interest is to be found in the negative space created by the object than in the positive...Painting should not stop with the already discovered beauty, but should continue searching."

In 1980, her work Symphony (1957) (Robert McLaughlin Gallery, Oshawa) in the Painters Eleven in Retrospect exhibition was praised as "the surprise of the exhibition", demonstrating many of the virtues of Painters Eleven at their best: "their ambition to make painting more autonomous, like music; their marvellous freedom and fluidity of touch; their modest directness in relation to the subject; their freedom to move anywhere their inspiration took them".

== Inner life ==
Luke's inner life was nourished by her imagination and reading books on art and spiritual, even esoteric, thought. In her early years of painting abstractly, she read about Theosophy, tutored by Hans Hofmann and Jock Macdonald, then in later years, she read and studied books by authors such as P. D. Ouspensky who also interested Macdonald. She wrote her thoughts about Ouspensky.

Around 1958, through Ouspensky she learnt of Gurdjieff and with others, started a Gurdjieff study group in Oshawa. She was interested enough in Gurdjieff to go to the Gurdjieff Foundation and attend meetings in Toronto and New York. Her diverse readings supplied imagery for her body of work.

== Later life ==
Luke continued to paint and support abstract art until her death from ovarian cancer on 1 June 1967. She had created a sizable volume of work and participated in over 80 group exhibitions and solo shows. She had also been made a member of several key Canadian art societies, including the Canadian Group of Painters in 1959 and the Ontario Society of Artists in 1960.

Shortly before her death, Luke and her husband Ewart offered major financial support and works from their own collection toward the creation of a public art gallery for the City of Oshawa, Ontario. This became The Robert McLaughlin Gallery, named after Ewart's grandfather, in 1967.

== Selected exhibitions ==
- 1947: Riverside Museum, New York City;
- 1952: Picture Loan Society, Toronto;
- 1953: Martha Jackson Gallery, New York;
- 1955: Eglinton Gallery, Toronto;
- 1956: Riverside Museum, New York City, Annual Exhibition of American Abstract Artists, with 'Painters Eleven' of Canada;
- 1960: Simpson's Baker Galleries, Toronto;
- 1969: The Robert McLaughlin Gallery, Oshawa;
- 1979: Painters Eleven in Retrospect, The Robert McLaughlin Gallery, Oshawa;
- 1987: The Robert McLaughlin Gallery, Oshawa, Alexandra Luke: Continued Searching, retrospective;
- 2002: The Alexandra Luke Gallery, Bracebridge (retrospective)
- 2023: Alexandra Luke: Push and Pull, The Robert McLaughlin Gallery, Oshawa;

== Selected public collections ==
- National Gallery of Canada, Ottawa;
- The Robert McLaughlin Gallery, Oshawa;
- Museum London, London, Ontario;

== Record sale prices ==
At the Joyner auction, Toronto, Luke's The Cloister (1953), estimate $20,000–$30,000 realised a price of $70,800.
