= Joan Willsher-Martel =

Canadian artist (1925–2017)

- Born: Joan Frances Willsher; May 28, 1925; Victoria, British Columbia
- Died: February 4, 2017 (aged 91); Toronto, Ontario, Canada
- Education: art instruction from her father, Harry F. Willsher, who taught drawing and painting at a private school in Victoria, British Columbia; instruction in painting from William Ronald (1953–1958)
- Spouse: Paul Martel

Joan Willsher-Martel (May 28, 1925 – February 4, 2017) was a painter of abstract and pointillist landscapes, in watercolour, drawings and oils.

== Career ==
Born in Victoria, British Columbia in 1925, Willsher-Martel received her early art instruction from her father, Harry F. Willsher, who taught drawing and painting at a private school in Victoria. In 1942, she saw a painting of trees by Emily Carr, which influenced her choice of subject matter in the 1970s. In 1950, she traveled in Europe for six months, and lived in London, England for a period of time. On returning to Canada in 1951, Willsher settled in Toronto and in 1953 began to study painting with William Ronald which she moved to New York to continue when he moved there (1956–1958).

Her paintings of the 1960s were abstract in composition and had thickly painted, gestural brushwork and vibrant colours, but in the 1970s, her work changed, becoming more tonal, and she created almost abstract landscapes. They drew upon her formative years on the West Coast with a reference to the scenic beauty of British Columbia and its light, space and atmosphere, such as Juan de Fuca (since 1996 a Provincial Park) on the west coast of southern Vancouver Island in her 1974 painting of the same name, a large panoramic diptych in oil on linen. In these works, she used a meticulous, almost pointillist technique calling on Monet, Pointillism and Emily Carr as well as distantly echoing the effect of photomechanical four–colour reproduction. The effect is of forms silhouetted in atmospheric curtains of colour, their presence more spectral than physical. "Cosmic Consciousness" was the title of the article by the curator in her retrospective catalogue in 2000.

In 1960, Willsher participated in a four-person exhibition at the Art Gallery of Toronto, Four Canadians. Her work was included in the important 1976 touring exhibition Changing Visions: The Canadian Landscape, organized by the Edmonton Art Gallery (now Art Gallery of Alberta) and the Art Gallery of Ontario with a catalogue by Karen Wilkin and Roald Nasgaard. In 1978, 1980, 1982, 1984, 1986, and 1988, she had solo exhibitions at Gallery Moos in Toronto, which presented her abstract landscapes in oil, and abstractions in watercolour. In 2000, Gallery Gevik in Toronto organized a retrospective. Her work is in such public collections as the Canada Council Art Bank, Ottawa; the Department of Foreign Affairs and International Trade, Sydney, Nova Scotia; and the University of Toronto.
