= Mashel Teitelbaum =

Canadian artist (1921-1985)

- Born: Mashel Alexander Teitelbaum; 1921; Saskatoon, Saskatchewan
- Died: 1985 (aged 63–64); Toronto, Ontario
- Education: California School of Fine Arts Mills College

Mashel Teitelbaum (1921–1985) (variant name Mashel Alexander Teitelbaum) was a Canadian painter, born in Saskatoon, Saskatchewan in 1921. He was the father of museum director Matthew Teitelbaum.

== Career ==
Teitelbaum studied from 1950 to 1951 at the California School of Fine Arts with Clyfford Still and at Mills College with Max Beckmann. After living in Montreal for a time, Teitelbaum moved to Toronto. In Toronto, worked as a set designer for CBC Television and served as art critic for the Toronto Telegram for over a decade. He then studied art in Europe, and taught at the School of Fine Arts at the University of Manitoba before returning to Toronto, founding the New School of Art at New School, Toronto in 1962.

== Art work ==
At first, Teitelbaum painted his own form of portraits featuring expressionism, then landscapes of various regions in Canada. His style became increasingly abstract throughout his years of painting, going through many changes, among them single Zen-like improvised gestures on unprimed canvas. By 1967, he critiqued modern art, then in 1973, he made paint skin constructions, of acrylic paint peeled away when dry from polyethylene sheets to make collages. He then turned to painting exuberant landscapes.

That he turned from abstraction to representation in some ways resembled that of other artists of his generation such as Duncan de Kergommeaux who also turned away from abstraction to depicy landscape.

== Personal life ==
With his wife Ethel — an administrator and later a government official — Teitelbaum had three children. Teitelbaum was popular in the Toronto art community, and the Teitelbaum household was often visited by artists, politicians, and other Canadian media figures.

In his final years, Teitelbaum repeatedly picketed the Art Gallery of Ontario for its failure to support contemporary Canadian artists. Teitelbaum's only son, Matthew, would become the museum's chief curator in 1993 and director in 1998.

Mashel Teitelbaum was described as a "brilliant but mercurial" artist, afflicted by bipolar disorder by the Toronto Star in 2009.

== Selected exhibitions ==
- 2004: MacLaren Art Centre, Barrie, Ontario: Abstract Innovations: Mashel Teitelbaum
- 1991: Mendel Art Gallery, Saskatoon, From Regionalism to Abstraction: Mashel Teitelbaum and Saskatchewan Art in the 1940s
- 1946: Saskatoon Art Centre, Saskatoon (with William Perehudoff)

== Selected collections ==
- Art Gallery of Ontario, Toronto
- Art Gallery of Peterborough
- Leonard and Bina Ellen Art Gallery, Concordia University, Montreal
- National Gallery of Canada, Ottawa
- MacKenzie Art Gallery, Regina
- Mendel Art Gallery, Saskatoon
- Robert McLaughlin Gallery, Oshawa
- Vancouver Art Gallery.
