= Malcolm Rogers (curator) =

British art historian and museum administrator

- Born: Malcolm A. Rogers; 3 October 1948 (age 77); Scarborough, North Yorkshire, England, United Kingdom
- Education: Magdalen College; Christ Church, University of Oxford

Malcolm Austin Rogers, CBE (born 1948 in Yorkshire) is a British art historian and museum administrator who served as the inaugural Ann and Graham Gund Director of the Museum of Fine Arts, Boston, Massachusetts, from 1994 through 2015, the longest serving director in the institution's 150-year history. In this role, Rogers raised the status of the museum locally, nationally, and internationally, and brought both extensive popularity and occasional controversy to the museum.

During his tenure, Rogers established a legacy of "opening doors" to the Boston community and audiences across the globe. He expanded the museum's encyclopedic collection and scholarship about it, mounted diverse and innovative exhibitions in MFA galleries and abroad, enhanced arts education and community outreach programs, and renovated and expanded the museum's historic building.

== Career ==
A native of Yorkshire, Rogers was educated at Oakham School in Rutland, and Magdalen College and Christ Church, Oxford, earning a B.A. with first class honors and a D.Phil. in English literature. His doctoral thesis was on the travel writings of George Sandys, Treasurer of the Colony of Virginia, credited with being America's first poet.

Prior to his role as Director of the MFA, Rogers worked his way up from Librarian and Archivist to deputy director at the National Portrait Gallery in London. An expert on 16th-, 17th-, and 18th-century portraiture, he has published on painting in England in the 17th century, notably on Anthony van Dyck and William Dobson, as well as on portrait photography, and London and its museums. In 1993 he was passed over for the position of Director of the National Portrait Gallery, and in the following year was appointed the Ann and Graham Gund Director of the Museum of Fine Arts, Boston, where he remained until his retirement in 2015.

In 1995, as a gesture of welcome to the community upon the museum's 125th anniversary, Rogers reopened the Huntington Avenue doors, the original front entrance, closed in 1991 for financial reasons. In the Director's Report that year, Rogers referred to the reopening as "a deeply symbolic gesture, signifying the Museum’s commitment to the educational and social development of the many and varied communities of Boston and beyond," a promise that Rogers manifested throughout the following two decades. Rogers subsequently worked with Mayor Thomas Menino to rename Huntington Avenue the "Avenue of the Arts," further strengthening the MFA's link with the city. In the mid-aughts, Rogers also orchestrated the restoration and reopening of the museum's other historic entrance, the MFA's State Street Corporation Fenway Entrance overlooking the Back Bay Fens, closed for 30 years.

In 1996, Rogers eliminated admission fees for those aged seventeen and younger and extended museum opening hours to seven days and more than 60 hours a week. Rogers also instituted a series of free community days, cultural celebrations, and education programs, which allowed the MFA to welcome more than one million visitors annually. Rogers’ decision to open the museum for longer hours (at the time, the longest of any major museum in the US) and reach out to new audiences in the surrounding community brought him acclaim. His initiatives reflected his philosophy of "opening doors" and making the museum accessible to all, a decision described by Geoff Edgers of The Boston Globe as "a step toward rejuvenating the MFA."

That same year, Rogers established the Director's Working Group on Diversity, comprising community leaders and MFA staff, which led to a range of community festivals and internship programs for teenagers, drawn from nearby schools and reflecting their diversity. In 2002, the museum released its Diversity Action Plan, prepared by Riscoe & Associates of Philadelphia, outlining steps to ensure the MFA is a trusted institution in which all Bostonians are stakeholders, and which truly represented the face of contemporary society.

A desire to also make the museum's collection available to a world-wide audience led in 2000 to the launch of the MFA's online searchable collections database at mfa.org. By Rogers’ departure in 2015, virtually the entire collection of 450,000 objects were available online.

In 1999, Rogers partnered with the Foundation for the Arts, Nagoya to open the Nagoya/Boston Museum of Fine Arts in Nagoya, Japan, marking the first time an American museum had opened a sister institution in Asia, and a significant step in further internationalizing the MFA's reputation. During the 20-year partnership, the N/BMFA presented over 30 exhibitions developed collaboratively by MFA and N/BMFA curators based on the MFA's collection and contributed considerable resources to scholarship and conservation.

Also in 1999, the MFA announced that the London-based, Pritzker Prize-winning architecture firm Foster and Partners had been hired to design a Master Site Plan for the museum that envisioned a transformative renovation and expansion of the building and site. Central to the plan was a new wing for the Art of the Americas collections and an adjacent glass-enclosed courtyard.

Opened in 2010, the wing was a milestone achievement for Rogers, featuring 53 new galleries and housing 5,000 American works of art spanning three millennia—from Ancient Americas, to revolutionary America, to the late 20th century. In addition to the wing and courtyard, the expansion included a new gallery for rotating exhibitions, a visitor center, an auditorium, educational spaces, and conservation labs. Under Rogers' direction, the museum's ‘Building the New MFA’ campaign raised $504 million. In all, the MFA received more than 25,000 contributions for the campaign, including 6,700 from first-time donors. Despite this success, the Museum took on $189 million in debt to fund the building projects, which had been reduced to $140 million by 2015 when Matthew Teitelbaum succeeded Rogers as Director.

In 2011, the museum's I.M. Pei-designed west wing was renovated and reopened as the Linde Family Wing for Contemporary Art, with seven new galleries, educational classrooms, and expanded space for community gatherings. Throughout Rogers’ tenure, he built or renovated 97 of the MFA's 143 galleries, described by art critic Sebastian Smee as having "dedicated great energy to the revamping of the museum’s permanent galleries."

Central to Rogers’ goal of stabilizing the museum's finances over the course of two decades was the endowment of 39 staff positions, including 28 in curatorial, nine in conservation, and two in education, and the museum recorded budget surpluses from 1996 until his retirement.

Throughout his directorship Rogers pursued expansion of the museum's collections, with renewed emphasis on Native American, Pre-Columbian, and African art. He also took the museum in new collecting directions, including Judaica, contemporary craft, fashion arts, jewelry, and visual cultures, as exemplified by the acquisition of the Leonard Lauder postcard collection (numbering 120,000 items). In this period over 65,000 other acquisitions were added. They range from the colossal imperial Roman statue of Juno to classic paintings by Edgar Degas, Gustave Caillebotte, Franz Xaver Winterhalter, and Jean-Honoré Fragonard to major twentieth-century and contemporary pieces by Piet Mondrian, Roy Lichtenstein, David Hockney, Joseph Beuys, Bridget Riley, Robert Mangold, Jim Dine, Takashi Murakami, Kara Walker, Tara Donovan, Kehinde Wiley, Mona Hatoum, and Anish Kapoor.

Collections acquired in this period include Axelrod (African American art), Farago (contemporary craft), Hartman (English silver), Lane (19th- and 20th-century photography), Lehman (West African art from the Kingdom of Benin), Pflueger (German porcelain), Rothschild (European jewelry, art, and decorative arts), Schusterman (Judaica), Sharf (fashion jewelry, design, and Japanese art), Teel (African, Oceanic, Ancient American, and Native American art), and Wornick (contemporary craft). Acquisitions of English and European silver, including many Kunstkammer objects, have made the MFA one of the most significant holders of such artifacts in the Americas.

In Rogers’ time, the museum held more than 375 exhibitions (often accompanied by scholarly catalogues), including Tales from Land of Dragons: 1000 Years of Chinese Paintings (1997), Monet in the 20th Century (1998), An Adventure with Wallace & Gromit (1998), Pharaohs of the Sun: Akhenaten, Nefertiti, Tutankhamen (1999), Rembrandt's Journey: Painter, Draftsman, Etcher (2003), Americans in Paris (2006), Titian, Tintoretto, Veronese: Rivals in Renaissance Venice (2009), Degas and the Nude (2011), and Class Distinctions: Dutch Painting in the Age of Rembrandt and Vermeer (2015). Rogers also broke tradition with exhibitions that redefined "fine art" and appealed to new audiences.

Upon the 2014 announcement of Rogers’ planned retirement, The Globe reported that "the MFA grew considerably during Rogers’ tenure, with the endowment rising from $180 million to $602 million." Having run 20 straight years of balanced operational budgets, he left the museum on firm financial footing with a robust staff to care for the museum's collection and continue his legacy of community enrichment and global engagement.

== Controversies ==
While projecting a conservative be-suited image, Rogers viewed himself as an agent of change. In a 2004 interview, he stated, "I wanted this institution to feel the power and joy of change... And that we had to do it as one museum, that we couldn’t do this as a collection of departments and special interests. We’re all in the same boat." As a result, and working in a reactionary cultural environment, his directorship was not without moments of intense controversy, fanned by media interest.

Some of his exhibitions, mounted with a view to broadening the museum's audience and shedding its elitist image, and which proved very popular with the public, attracted indignation in some areas: notably Herb Ritts: Work (1996), a retrospective of the Hollywood fashion and celebrity photographer, whom Rogers saw as a brilliant image-maker evoking a world without boundaries of class and sexuality; Dangerous Curves: The Art of the Guitar (2000), featuring guitars from the sixteenth century to those of contemporary rock stars; Speed, Style and Beauty: Cars from the Ralph Lauren Collection (2005), showcasing the famous American fashion designer's collection of luxury cars renowned for their remarkable design quality; and Things I Love: The Many Collections of William I. Koch (2005), displaying choice objects from Koch's many collections—from ancient Roman to contemporary American, including the contentious decision to exhibit two America's Cup yachts on the Huntington Avenue lawn.

The Museum's program of national and international loan exhibitions (which had begun long before Rogers’ tenure and which provided valuable income for the museum) was expanded in Rogers’ time. Exhibitions, and sometimes individual masterpieces, traveled to Japan, South Korea, Italy, and Switzerland. It was, however, the Museum's venturing to Las Vegas (at the same time as the Hermitage Museum and the Solomon R. Guggenheim Museum had presences there) that aroused most controversy, and in particular the loan of 21 paintings by Monet to the Bellagio Gallery of Fine Art, reportedly for a fee of $1 million.

In 1999, in the process of creating departments of Art of the Americas and of European Art, which Rogers saw as a necessary unifying of the old divisions between paintings and decorative arts, and in preparation for the creation of the Art of the Americas Wing, the positions of two senior curators, Jonathan Leo Fairbanks (28 years tenure) and Anne Poulet (20 years tenure), were eliminated and the curators awarded Emeritus status. However, this rapidly became a ‘firing’ story in the media, and in academic circles was seen as an attack on tenure. Some MFA supporters were outraged. A number of art historians and staff at other art museums criticized Rogers' management style for featuring centralized decision-making (rather than individual curators retaining control over their fiefdoms) and for allegedly prioritizing financial stability over scholarship. Rogers, however, rejected these charges, saying that he was restructuring the organization, to bring paintings and decorative arts into closer conversation, as exemplified in the galleries of the new wing, and to bring overall directional focus to the MFA and not simply to centralize power.

The distinguished scholar of American art, Theodore Stebbins (22 years tenure), resigned after serving for a short time as the first chair of the new Americas department. He was succeeded by Elliot Bostwick Davis, formerly of the Metropolitan Museum of Art, who embraced the new structure, and undertook the huge Art of the Americas Wing project, and brought it to successful completion.

During Rogers’ tenure, the issues of museum ownership of other nations’ cultural property and of Holocaust restitutions aroused considerable concern. In response, the MFA conducted extensive provenance research on antiquities and European art in its collection, and the museum reached numerous ownership resolutions with Holocaust victims and foreign nations. Despite arguments with Guatemala in the late ’90s, the vast majority of repatriation inquiries resulted in mutually agreed conclusions with estates/heirs and countries, including Italy, Turkey, and Nigeria, as well as the resolution of Holocaust claims whenever justified. A non-combative approach to repatriation conversations with Italy led to a successful cultural partnership between the museum and the country. In 2003, Rogers established the Monica S. Sadler Curator for Provenance, an endowed role focused exclusively on collection-based provenance research, repatriation claims, and the rightful ownership of cultural property. The MFA's Curator of Provenance was the first position of its kind in the U.S.

Rogers was criticized during his tenure at the MFA for his large salary and benefits packages that he received as director. In 2013, it was reported that he received a total compensation of over $900,000 including health and pension benefits and a housing allowance. However, in 2010 Rogers was named a Great Benefactor, recognizing gifts to the museum in excess of $2.5 million—the first MFA Director to earn this distinction.

According to The Art Newspaper, Rogers supplied James Stunt with letters of opinion supporting the authenticity of paintings owned by Stunt, where the authorship of some of the works of art has described by other experts as questionable.

== Retirement ==
Following his retirement from the MFA, Boston, Rogers returned to England and now lives with his partner in Broadway in the Cotswolds in a house that in the 1880s was the center of ‘the Broadway Colony’ of English and American artists and writers, among them John Singer Sargent, Edwin Austin Abbey, Sir Lawrence Alma-Tadema, Edmund Gosse, and Henry James. The house was owned by Francis Davis Millet, a Founder of the School of the Museum of Fine Arts in 1870, who was offered but rejected the directorship of the MFA in 1906. Millet perished on the Titanic in 1912.

Rogers continues to be deeply involved in the not-for-profit world as a volunteer.

== Awards and Recognitions ==
- Freeman of the City of London (1992)
- Commander, Order of the British Empire, United Kingdom (2003)
- Chevalier, Ordre des Arts et des Lettres, France (2007)
- Apollo magazine’s "Personality of the Year" (2009)
- Foundation for Italian Art and Culture's Award in Italian Culture, United States (2010)
- Commendatore al Merito della Repubblica Italiana, Italy (2009)
- Encomienda (Commander) de la Orden de Isabel la Católica, Spain (2010)
- Honorary Doctorates from Emmanuel College and the former Boston Architectural Center

Rogers is a member of the American Academy of Arts and Sciences and of the Society of Antiquaries of London. In 2011–2012, he was Humanitas Visiting professor in Museums, Galleries, and Libraries at Oxford University.

His London apartment was featured in Architectural Digest in January 1995, shortly after his move to Boston. In 2012, New England Home magazine featured Rogers’ house La Bastille in Royalston, Massachusetts, which had been the summer home of Zita, the last empress of Austria and queen of Hungary, after she fled Europe with her children during World War II.

Preceded by Alan Shestack	Ann and Graham Gund Director; Museum of Fine Arts, Boston; 1994–2015	Succeeded by Matthew Teitelbaum
