= Nagoya/Boston Museum of Fine Arts =

Museum in Nagoya, Aichi, Japan

Coordinates: 35.14268°N 136.9°E

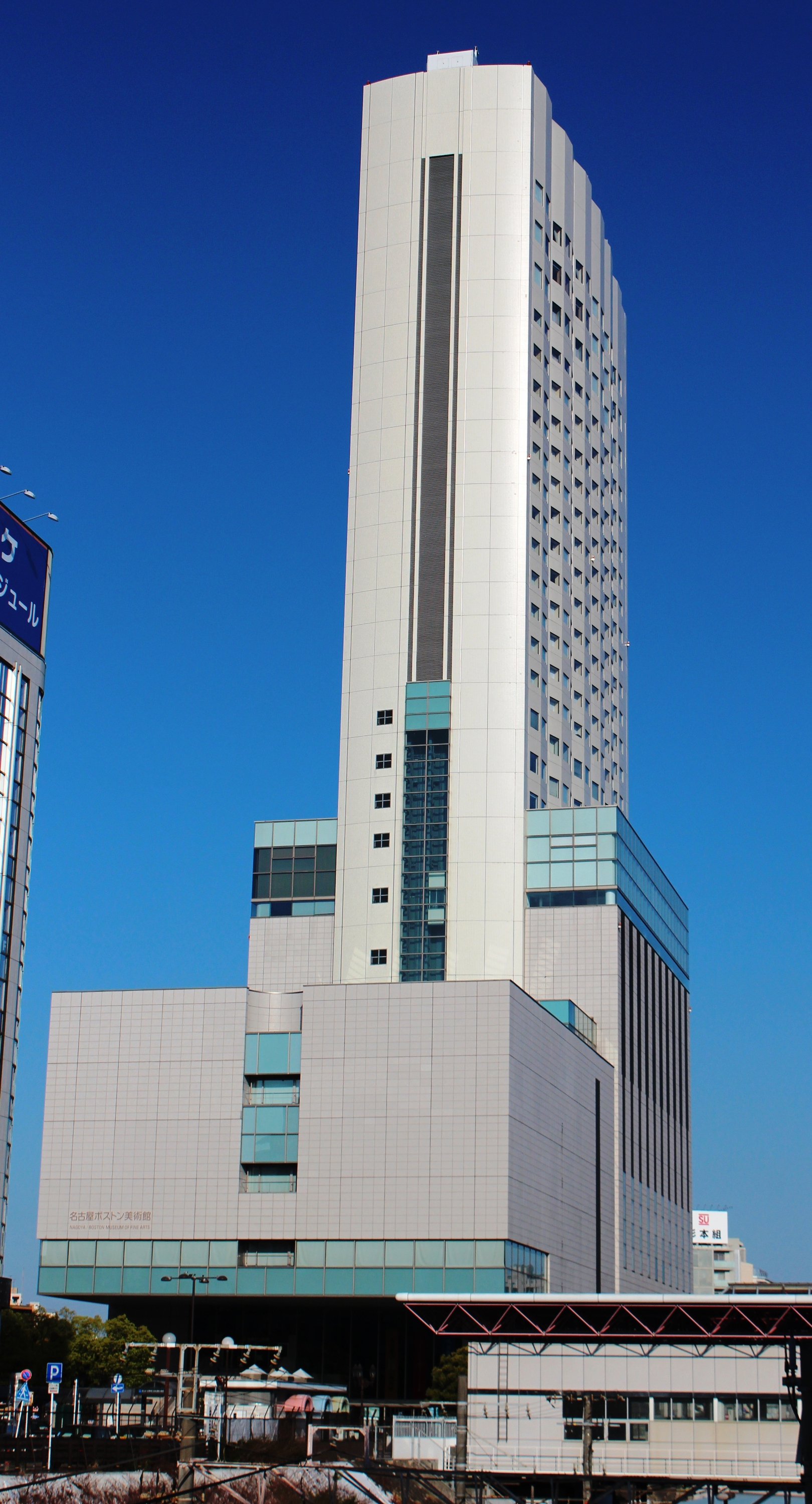
Kanayama South Building where the museum was located

The Nagoya/Boston Museum of Fine Arts (N/BMFA) (名古屋ボストン美術館, Nagoya Bosuton Bijutsukan) was an art museum in Nagoya, Japan, that operated from 1999 to 2018.

== History ==
A sister institution of the Museum of Fine Arts, Boston (the MFA), the Nagoya/Boston Museum of Fine Arts was established in partnership with the Foundation for the Arts, Nagoya (FAN) to bring treasures from the MFA's collection to Japan. There was also an economic impetus for the partnership: the MFA, under intense budget pressure at the time, agreed to send art from its permanent collection in exchange for $50 million to be paid over a 20-year period. Under the agreement, the MFA was to send two five-month loan exhibitions to the Nagoya museum each year; longer-term, five-year exhibits were also planned. Works from the MFA's highly respected Department of Asian Art were to be displayed in a "Japanese corner."

After years of planning, the museum formally opened on April 17, 1999, in a three-level, 4,700 square meter (50,590 square foot) space that was attached to a 31-story hotel adjacent to Nagoya's Kanayama Station. The inaugural show, a survey of Barbizon School, Impressionist and post-Impressionist paintings that included 62 works by such artists as Monet, Gauguin and Van Gogh, was a hit, drawing 9,000 visitors its first weekend and nearly 450,000 over its four-and-a-half-month run. "This is a model for the entire world to look at and admire," MFA director Malcolm Rogers declared at the opening ceremony.

The museum's opening show was followed by similarly crowd-pleasing exhibitions featuring works by Corot, Millet, Renoir, Gauguin and other 19th-century French painters. Many other offerings were considerably less popular, however. A show of American landscape paintings reportedly drew only 10,000 visitors in its first two months. Within four years of its opening, the museum had accumulated a deficit of nearly $35 million.

Rogers and the MFA drew extensive criticism for curatorial choices the Boston museum imposed and for what Sebastian Smee of the Boston Globe called "a missing sense of conviction about its purpose." The Nagoya museum did not have its own curators planning exhibitions for Japanese audiences, the Globe reported; it was reliant on what the MFA chose to send its way. Vishakha Desai, a former MFA curator who subsequently became president of the Asia Society in New York, described the project as "a deal made for money. The idea was, 'You pay the money and you can get what we have.' The strategy was almost — and I hate to use the word — neocolonial."

Although the museum had been planned as a 20-year joint venture with expectations that it would be renewed, low visitor numbers led to its closure in October 2018, several months ahead of its planned initial run. Its final exhibition, "In Pursuit of Happiness: Favorite Works from the Museum of Fine Arts, Boston," was held from July 24 to October 8 of that year.

== See also ==
- Museum of Fine Arts, Boston
