= Kazuo Nakamura =

Canadian artist (1926–2002)

- Born: October 13, 1926; Vancouver, British Columbia
- Died: April 9, 2002 (aged 75); Toronto, Ontario
- Education: Central Technical School
- Known for: painter, sculptor
- Movement: Painters Eleven, abstract expressionism
- Awards: Honorary Fellow, Ontario College of Art & Design; member, Royal Canadian Academy

Kazuo Nakamura RCA was a Japanese-Canadian painter and sculptor (born Vancouver, October 13, 1926; died Toronto, April 9, 2002) and a founding member of the Toronto-based Painters Eleven group in the 1950s. Among the first major Japanese Canadian artists to emerge in the twentieth century, Nakamura created innovative landscape paintings and abstract compositions inspired by nature, mathematics, and science. His painting is orderly and restrained in contrast to other members of Painters Eleven. His idealism about science echoed the beliefs of Lawren Harris and Jock Macdonald.

== Life ==
Kazuo Nakamura was born in Vancouver, British Columbia, as a second-generation Japanese Canadian (nisei). He began his art training in 1940 at the Vancouver Technical Secondary School. Jock Macdonald, who was teaching there, is believed to have taught Nakamura design and also tutored him in drawing and painting. Nakamura was a teenager when he became one of the 22,000 Japanese Canadians interned during World War II. At the Tashme Incarceration Camp, near Hope, British Columbia, Nakamura continued to create artworks, such as the painting Tashme at Dusk, July/August 1944 (1944). Although he was able to paint only at day’s end, art provided an essential escape. Nakamura has said little about his state of mind during the Japanese Internment, though he notably attended a 50th anniversary camp reunion later in life.

Forbidden by the Canadian government from returning home to British Columbia after the war, Nakamura lived in Hamilton, Ontario, briefly before settling in Toronto in August 1947. He studied at Toronto's Central Technical School (1948–51), and was a founding member of Painters Eleven. Although sharing in the other members' use of painterly abstraction, Nakamura's work was distinguished within the group by his use of simpler structures and monochromatic colours. While he is largely known as a member of Painters Eleven, Nakamura achieved tremendous success outside of the group and was internationally recognized by the late 1950s.

== Work ==
Inner Structure, 1956, oil on masonite

Influenced by fellow Painters Eleven member Jock Macdonald's interest in László Moholy-Nagy's reading of science, Nakamura was concerned with science, time and space. Nakamura described himself as seeking a "fundamental universal pattern in all art and nature" reflected in his "inner structure" paintings from the 1950s. In the 1970s and 1980s he increasingly emphasized his grid paintings based on number structures, which came to involve the Fibonacci number system. To Nakamura, these laboriously inscribed works were a quest for some ultimate order in the apparent chaos of the universe. He regarded the Number Structure series as his most important body of work, although his blue/green landscapes, which he began producing in the 1960s, are his most popular and recognizable paintings.

Contemporary scholars have noted the influence of Nakamura's financial reality in his work. Writing in Kazuo Nakamura: Life & Work for the Art Canada Institute, John G. Hatch notes that Nakamura's palette grew increasingly rich and diverse throughout his career, arguing that the relative simplicity of the artist's early style grew out of material burden.

== Commissions ==
His work is part of the permanent collection at Toronto's Lester Pearson International Airport and Ontario Provincial Queen's Park Complex.

== Selected public gallery exhibitions ==
In 1983 and 1984 as part of Ontario Heritage Foundation's Firestone Collection Nakamura's work toured London (UK), Paris and Madrid. In 1991 he exhibited at the New Canadian Embassy in Tokyo and in 1992 at Ader Tajan, Art Contemporain du Canada, Espace Chapon in Paris.

In 2004 he was the subject of the posthumous retrospective Kazuo Nakamura: The Human Measure at the Art Gallery of Ontario in Toronto. In 2023, the AGO organized Kazuo Nakamura (1926-2002): Blue Dimension, an exhibition of 15 paintings from the AGO Collection ranging from the 1950s to 1980s which opened in 2024.

== Honours ==
In 2000 Nakamura was made an honorary fellow at OCAD University He also was made a member of the Royal Canadian Academy of Arts.

== Bibliography ==
- Brandon, Laura (2021). War Art in Canada: A Critical History. Toronto: Art Canada Institute. ISBN 978-1-4871-0271-5.
- Hatch, John G. (2021). Kazuo Nakamura: Life & Work. Toronto: Art Canada Institute. ISBN 978-1-4871-0258-6.
- Hill, Richard William; Mighton, John; Nakamura, Kazuo; Sakamoto, Kerri (2004). Kazuo Nakamura: A Human Measure. Toronto: Art Gallery of Ontario. ISBN 1-894243-42-0.
- Holubizky, Ihor; Nakamura, Kazuo (2001). Kazuo Nakamura: The Method of Nature. Oshawa, Ontario: Robert McLaughlin Gallery. ISBN 0-921500-50-5.
- Nasgaard, Roald (2008). Abstract Painting in Canada. Douglas & McIntyre. pp. 115–118. ISBN 978-1-55365-394-3.
- Nowell, Iris (2011). P11, Painters Eleven: The Wild Ones of Canadian Art. Douglas & McIntyre. ISBN 9781553655909.
