= Hortense Gordon =

Canadian artist

- Born: Hortense Crompton Mattice; 24 November 1886; Hamilton, Ontario, Canada
- Died: November 6, 1961 (aged 74); Hamilton, Ontario, Canada
- Known for: Painter
- Movement: Abstract expressionism, Painters Eleven
- Spouse: John Sloan Gordon

Hortense Gordon RCA (24 November 1886 – 6 November 1961), born Hortense Crompton Mattice, was a Canadian artist who worked abstractly in later life and became a member of Painters Eleven.

== Life and early work ==
Born in Hamilton, Ontario, Gordon was the youngest daughter of Sarah Louise Crompton and James Harvey Mattice. The family lived on Catharine street in central Hamilton and encouraged their children to paint and draw. While still in public school, Gordon attended Saturday morning art classes at the Hamilton Art School and received a scholarship for her efforts.

She spent a large portion of her childhood creating art in the shadow of her elder sister Marion Mattice (1878–1956). Although there was a large age difference between the two, the girls were known to be in fierce competition with each other and would often not get along.

After her father's retirement in 1903, Gordon chose to leave Hamilton to live with relatives on a 200-acre fruit farm near Chatham, Ontario. It was here where she began to study and paint china with her cousins. Realizing this was a marketable skill, she decided to rent a studio to sell her unique china pieces and teach art to locals. She held her first exhibition of china from December 14–16, 1908, at the Hotel Sanita (presently the Chatham Cultural Centre). For a number of years Gordon worked as a teacher at the Hamilton Technical School, and was known to aggressively seek out exhibition opportunities. She was well regarded not only for her china works but also a steadily growing portfolio of Canadian landscape paintings.

In 1916, Hortense's father died in Hamilton. When she returned for the funeral, she was approached by John Gordon, who suggested she consider teaching at the Hamilton Art School. She joined the staff in October 1918 and after being courted by Gordon for a number of years, the two were married on 3 August 1920. The married couple often traveled to Europe in the summers, where Gordon was inspired by the Barbizon School and other European masters. Her landscape works developed an increasingly soft, loose paint handling style and a sense of spontaneity.

== Later life and the Painters Eleven ==
For almost four decades, Gordon painted landscapes and still life almost exclusively. However, after the death of her husband in 1940, Hortense's style changed.

She studied at the Cranbrook Academy of Art between 1941 and 1945 with abstract expressionist Hans Hofmann. Hofmann's influence and friendship pushed her to abandon strict realism and explore non-objective painting. She began to paint cubist–inspired works with jutting angles, linear forms and energetic movement.

This style gained her recognition on a national scale. She was named honorary president of the Contemporary Artists of Hamilton in 1948 and soon after joined the Painters Eleven as their oldest member in 1952. Through this group, she was inspired to create more non–objective art and she was given the opportunity to participate in high–profile exhibitions in New York and Toronto. She was made a member of the Royal Canadian Academy of Arts.

Gordon spent the last decade of her life painting countless works and showcasing her works in diverse galleries across Ontario. She was forced into the hospital with emphysema and a heart condition in 1961, and died on 6 November 1961.

== Select exhibitions ==
- 1928: Norman C. Maynard, Hamilton;
- 1952: Philips Gallery, Detroit;
- 1954: Art Gallery of Windsor, now Art Windsor-Essex);
- 1961: Gallery Moos, Toronto;
- 1993: Thames Art Gallery (retrospective);
- 1994: The Robert McLaughlin Gallery (retrospective), Oshawa;
- 2025: Hortense Gordon: Towards the New, The Robert McLaughlin Gallery, Oshawa

== Selected public collections ==
- National Gallery of Canada, Ottawa
- The Robert McLaughlin Gallery, Oshawa
- Thames Art Gallery, Chatham
- Art Gallery of Hamilton, Hamilton
