= Fritz Max Cahén =

Political activist and journalist

- Born: 8 December 1891; Saarlouis
- Died: 29 August 1966 (aged 74); Bonn
- Occupation: journalist
- Spouse: Eugenie Caroline Auguste Stamm
- Children: Oscar Cahén & Ulrich (possible)
- Parent: Eugen Cahén

Fritz Max Cahén (alias Lynkeus) (8 December 1891 in Saarlouis – 29 August 1966 in Bonn) was active in the Weimar Republic government and later founded the anti-Nazi political alliance Volkssozialistische Bewegung (Cahén later referred to it as, in English, the German Front Against Hitlerism). He worked as a journalist and also authored the books Der Weg nach Versailles (1963) and Men Against Hitler (1939). Cahén, Fritz Max ‘’Der rote ‘’. Sowjetische und westliche Ideologie in der Wirklichkeit. Frankfurt am Main, Athenäum Verlag (1961).

== Life ==
Fritz Max Cahén was born to a Jewish father; his mother was possibly Christian. His father, Eugen Cahén, was a founder of the Saar Produce Exchange, and a member of the Hansabund. Fritz Max Cahén graduated from the College of Metz (Alsace-Lorraine) and Saarbruecken University Marburg/Lahn. He took postgraduate courses at the Sorbonne (Paris) and Haute Ecole des Sciences Politiques et Sociales (Paris). In 1916 he married Eugenie Caroline Auguste Stamm, a Protestant, according to a marriage certificate in possession of the family. Fritz Max Cahén had one son that same year, artist Oscar Cahén. A reference work on Jewish émigrés also refers to a second son, Ulrich, born in 1925; if true, this child was not raised by Fritz Max and Eugenie.

Before the first World War, Cahén moved in German avant-garde art circles, contributing translations of Apollinaire to the Expressionist periodical Der Sturm. As a young critic, he saw a connection between politics and art, suggesting in 1914 that the First World War would be fought over the future of German Expressionism, rather than Belgium's neutrality or the Assassination of Archduke Franz Ferdinand of Austria of June 1914.

As a civil servant in the German Legation in Copenhagen 1916 - 1918, Cahén became "personal advisor" to Count Brockdorff-Rantzau, High Commissioner at the Versailles Peace Conference. Cahén wrote articles for many newspapers and magazines, sometimes under the name Lynkeus, including Die Schaubuehne (Berlin), Deutsche Politik (Berlin), Politiken (Copenhagen), L'Europe Nouvelle (Paris), Die Bruecke (Prague), Berliner Tageblatt, Frankfurter Zeitung, Commentator (USA), Koelnische Zeitung, Skaanska Aftonbladet (Sweden), Deutsche Kunst und Decoration (Darmstadt).

In 1933, Cahén took refuge in Prague, where he co-wrote the script for Kiss in the Snow (directed by Rudolf Katscher), the German-language version of the 1934 film Polibek ve sněhu (directed by Václav Binovec). In Prague Cahén also intensified his political activities, and on 5 February 1936 he founded the Volkssozialistische Bewegung with Hans Jaeger and Arthur Arzt. The British authorities, but not the Americans, suspected Cahén of being a Soviet spy.

In 1937, Cahén traveled to the United States in order to raise awareness of Nazi activities and to write Men Against Hitler, which outlined the resistance activities he had participated in. Cahén asserted that half of German citizens did not actually support the Nazi regime and that their disaffection represented an opportunity to overthrow Hitler. He had the support of Wythe Williams, editor of the Greenwich Times; Williams acted as a literary agent, and translator, and wrote the book's introduction as well. Cahén also joined the New York-based group the German-American Council for the Liberation of Germany From Nazism, later renamed Association of Free Germans.

With the outbreak of the Second World War, Fritz Max Cahén was stuck in the United States and he lived there until 1954, when he returned to Germany and resumed his civil service work and writing. Meanwhile, his wife and son Oscar Cahén had become Canadian citizens; his wife joined him in Germany in the 1950s. Fritz Max Cahén died in Bonn on 29 August 1966.
