= Charles Hepburn Scott =

Scottish-born Canadian artist

Charles Hepburn Scott (29 November 1886 – 1964) was a Scottish-born Canadian artist.

== Early life ==
Scott was born in Loudoun, Ayrshire, to Robert Hepburn and Jean (née Carmichael) Scott.

== Career ==
Scott was a student at Glasgow School of Art from 1903 to 1909, where he studied both drawing and painting while working as a letter artist and art teacher. After graduating from the Glasgow school of art in 1909, he emigrated to Canada in 1912, where he was appointed as Art Supervisor for Calgary Schools. Eventually, Scott settled in Vancouver in 1914, working as Art Supervisor for Vancouver Schools. After the outbreak of World War I, Scott enlisted in the Canadian Force, serving overseas from 1915 to 1918. After the war, he returned to British Columbia where, in 1919, his belief in the importance of a community's cultural consciousness lead him to become a founding member of the British Columbian Arts League. As part of this group, Scott helped to lobby for the establishment of an art school and gallery in Vancouver, neither of which existed in the city prior to that time.

In 1935 the Vancouver School of Decorative and Applied Art (later the Vancouver School of Art and currently the Emily Carr University of Art and Design) opened its doors; Scott served as principal of the school from 1926 until 1952. Scott was instrumental in getting Jock Macdonald and Fred Varley to teach at the school. These notable artists benefited the school and Scott as they could go on sketching trips together. Scott's significant contribution to Vancounver's culture was not limited to the school: in 1931, he joined Henry A. Stone, one of the founders of the as yet unopened Vancouver Art Gallery on a trip which Scott saw as a "dream come true". He was able to help Stone acquire over 110 works of art. This collection was to be basis of the Art Gallery's growing acquisitions. When the gallery opened later that year the public was able to view Stone and Scott's purchases.

While working for the Vancouver School of Decorative and Applied Art, Scott continued to produce his own work. It was during this time that the artist painted Alfresco (1933), Portrait of Melvin, and Morning Tea, each of help to document his family's life in Vancouver. His art also frequently featured the BC landscape, as he found time to paint and sketch outdoors while on Vancouver School of Decorative and Applied Art's regular summer camps.

== Death and legacy ==
Scott died in Vancouver in 1964 at the age of 78. He is listed on The Glasgow School of Art's World War One Roll of Honour. The Vancouver Art Gallery holds many of his notable works, including Alfresco. His portrait, Miss Elizabeth, hangs in the collection of New College, Oxford.
