= Matthew Teitelbaum =

Canadian art historian (born 1956)

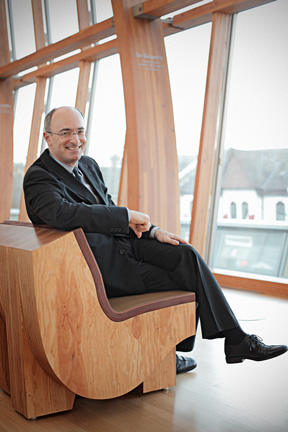
- Teitelbaum in 2011
- Born: Matthew D. Teitelbaum; February 13, 1956 (age 70); Toronto, Ontario, Canada
- Education: Carleton University; Courtauld Institute of Art
- Spouse: Susan M. Cohen
- Children: 2

Matthew D. Teitelbaum CM (born February 13, 1956) is a Canadian art historian and former director of Museum of Fine Arts in Boston, Massachusetts.

== Early life and education ==
Born in Toronto, Ontario, Teitelbaum is the third child and only son of the late painter Mashel Teitelbaum. His mother Ethel was an administrator and later a government official. The household was noisy, busy, and frequented by artists, politicians, writers, and media figures.

Teitelbaum holds a BA in Canadian history from Carleton University and an MPhil in modern European painting and sculpture from the Courtauld Institute of Art.

== Career ==
Teitelbaum has taught and lectured at Harvard University, York University, and the University of Western Ontario.

Teitelbaum first held curatorial positions with the Institute of Contemporary Art, Boston, and the Mendel Art Gallery. He later joined the Art Gallery of Ontario in 1993 as chief curator and was later appointed as the Michael and Sonja Koerner Director and CEO in 1998. As a curator, he has published numerous publications and exhibition catalogues on modern and contemporary Canadian artists as Greg Curnoe, Paterson Ewen, Joe Fafard, Betty Goodwin, Edward Poitras, and Robert Wiens. As the museum's director and CEO, he oversaw the institution’s $306 million expansion and renovation of its Beaux-Arts building by the architect Frank Gehry.

In 2015, the Museum of Fine Arts, Boston announced that Teitelbaum had been chosen to serve as its Ann and Graham Gund Director, replacing Malcolm Rogers, who had served as the museum's director for 21 years. On June 20, 2024, he announced his plans to retire from the Museum of Fine Arts in August of 2025.

== Personal life ==
Teitelbaum is married to Susan M. Cohen, who served as the executive director of the W. Garfield Weston Foundation. They have two sons, Max and Elijah.

== Honors ==
- Honorary Doctor of Law, Queen's University, Kingston, Ontario, Canada (2002)
- Chevalier dans l'Ordre des Arts et des Lettres, France (2006)
- Member of the Order of Canada (2019)

Preceded by Malcolm Rogers	Ann and Graham Gund Director; Museum of Fine Arts, Boston; 2015 – present	Incumbent

Preceded by Maxwell L. Anderson	Michael and Sonja Koerner Director and CEO; Art Gallery of Ontario; 1998 – 2015	Incumbent
