= Max Frey =

German painter

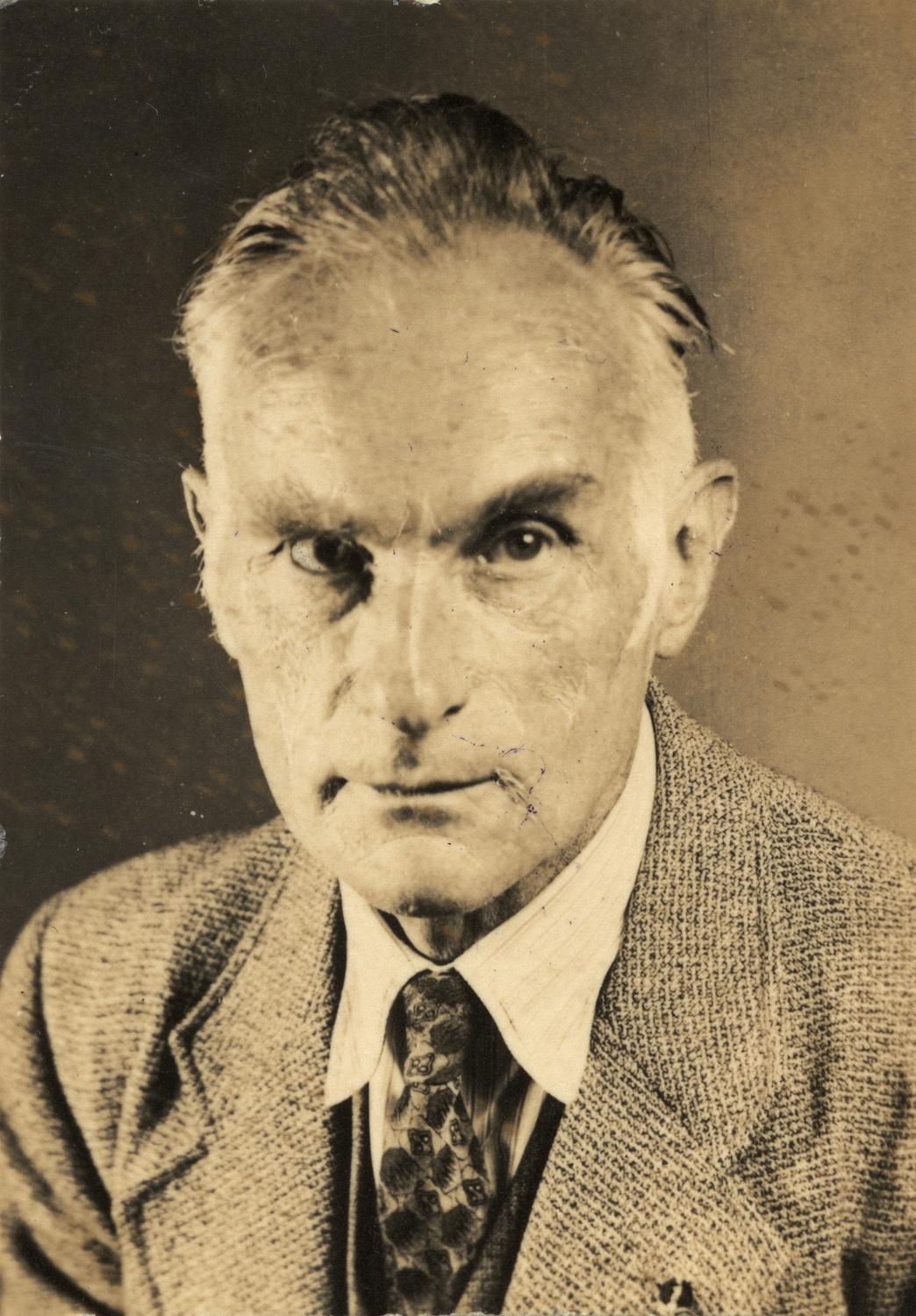
- Pass photograph from 1938
- Born: 16 April 1874; Mühlburg, near Karlsruhe, Baden-Württemberg, Germany
- Died: 11 March 1944 (aged 69); Bad Harzburg, Lower Saxony, Germany
- Occupations: painter Graphic artist

Max Frey (April 16, 1874 – March 11, 1944) was a German painter and graphic artist associated with the Symbolism and New Objectivity movements. Some of his works contained elements of magical realism.

== Life ==
He was born to a family of merchants and began his education at the Arts and Crafts school in Karlsruhe. For a short time, he worked as a theater painter in Berlin then, from 1893–1903 studied at the Academy of Fine Arts in Karlsruhe under Ferdinand Keller, Gustav Schönleber and Leopold von Kalckreuth. While there, he participated in the activities of numerous art associations.

Max Frey moved to Frankfurt in 1904 and married the daughter of a manufacturer. Later, in 1906, they moved to Dresden. In 1907, he became a teacher in graphic design and painting at the Dresden Academy of Fine Arts and taught a newly created class especially for women. Among his students were Margarete Wendt and Margarete Kühn, who went on to create the firm of Wendt & Kühn. He was appointed a Professor in 1910. His other students included Hans Grundig, Willy Wolff and Oscar Cahén.

Max Frey was a member of the Deutscher Künstlerbund and the Dresden Art Cooperative. He also was a founding member of the artists' group Grün-Weiß and the Dresdner Künstlergruppe 1913.

He was called up during the First World War and returned to Dresden after being mustered out of service. He stayed at the Academy until 1934, then retired to Bad Harzburg. Four years later, his marriage ended in divorce. The following year he married a former pupil, Editha von Froebel, who was considerably younger. They had one son. Max Frey died at home on 11 March 1944. He was buried at a cemetery in the Tolkewitz district of Dresden.

== Works ==
=== Graphic works ===
His graphic work was inspired by the Art Nouveau movement.

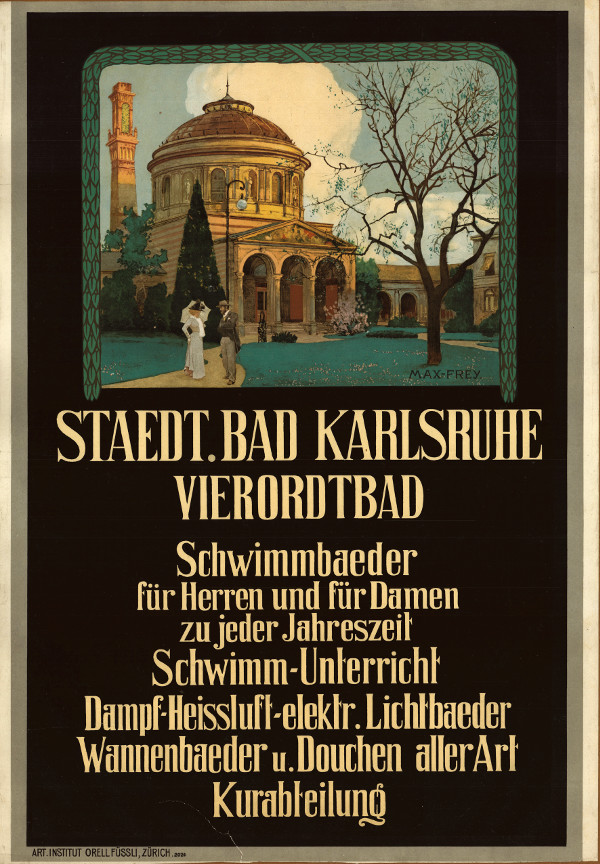
Poster, 1900

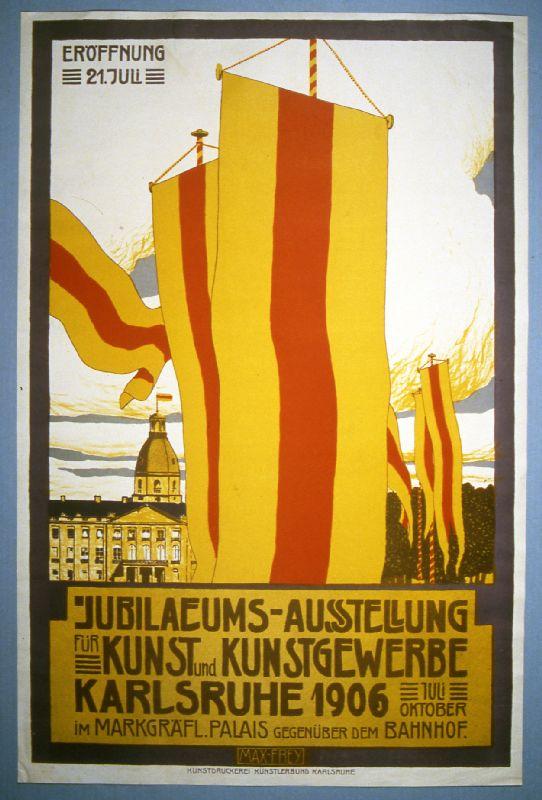
Exhibition poster, 1906

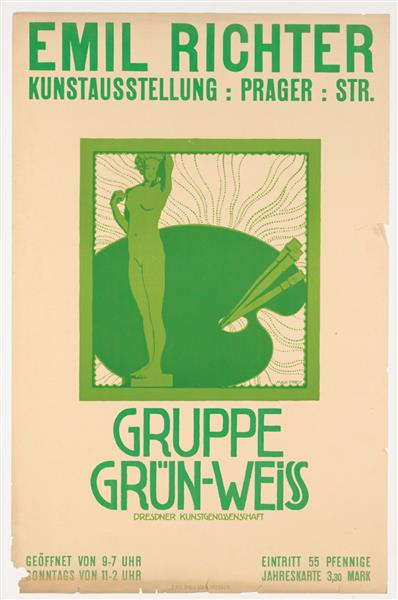
Exhibition poster, 1910

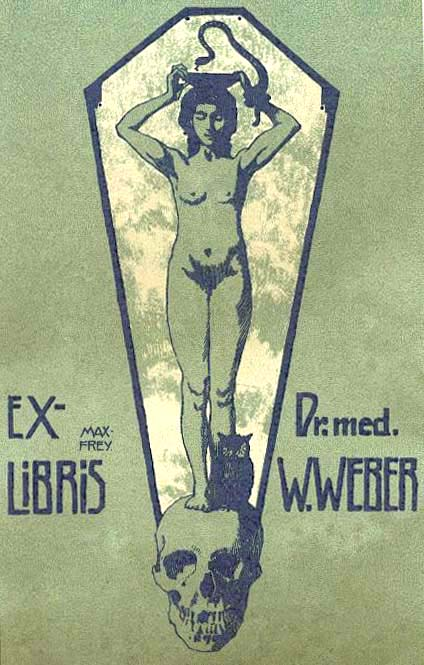
Bookplate, around 1910

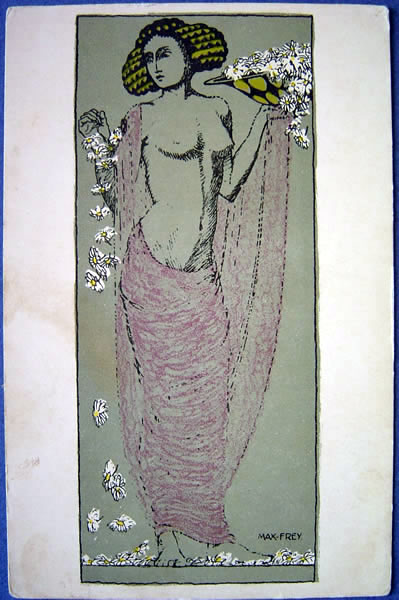
Postcard, 1911

=== Paintings ===
His paintings during the late 1920s and 1930s were influenced by the New Objectivity movement under the style of Magic realism.

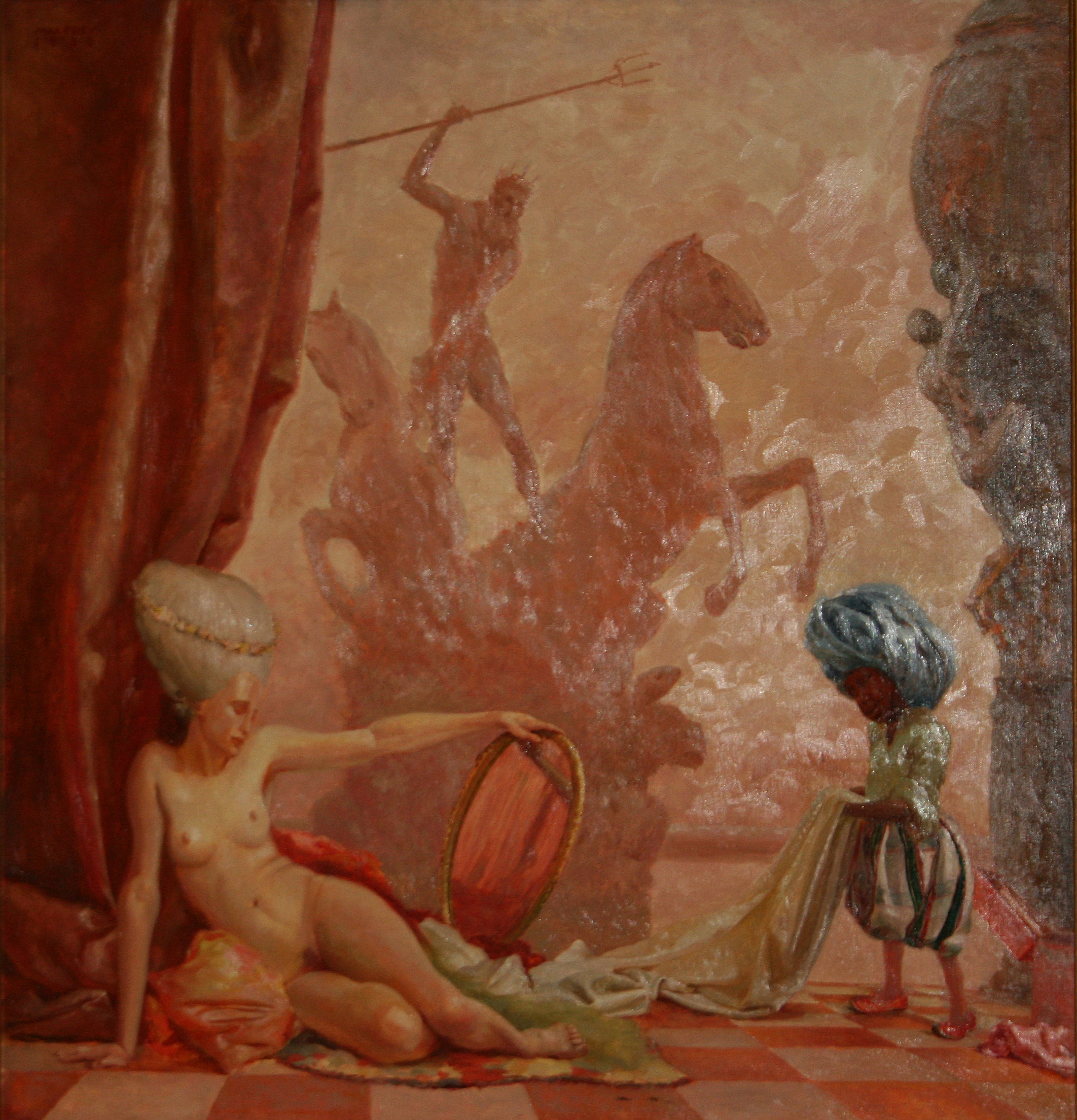
Scene from
Die ägyptische Helena

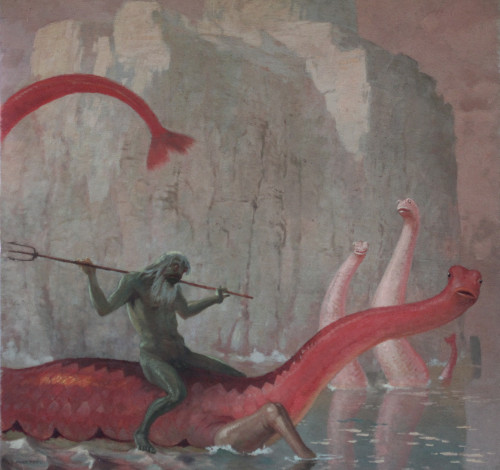
Poseidon

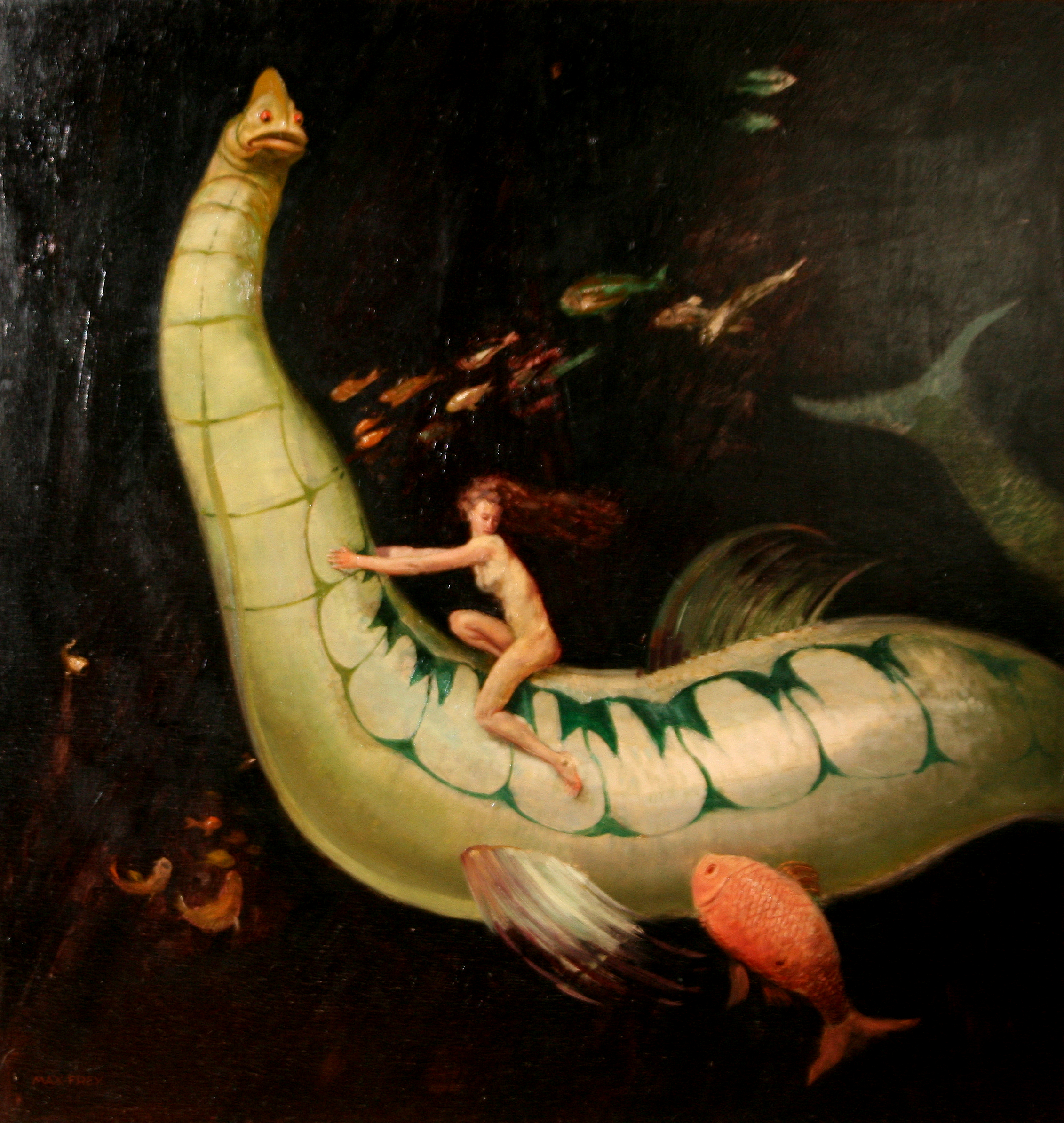
Sea-creature

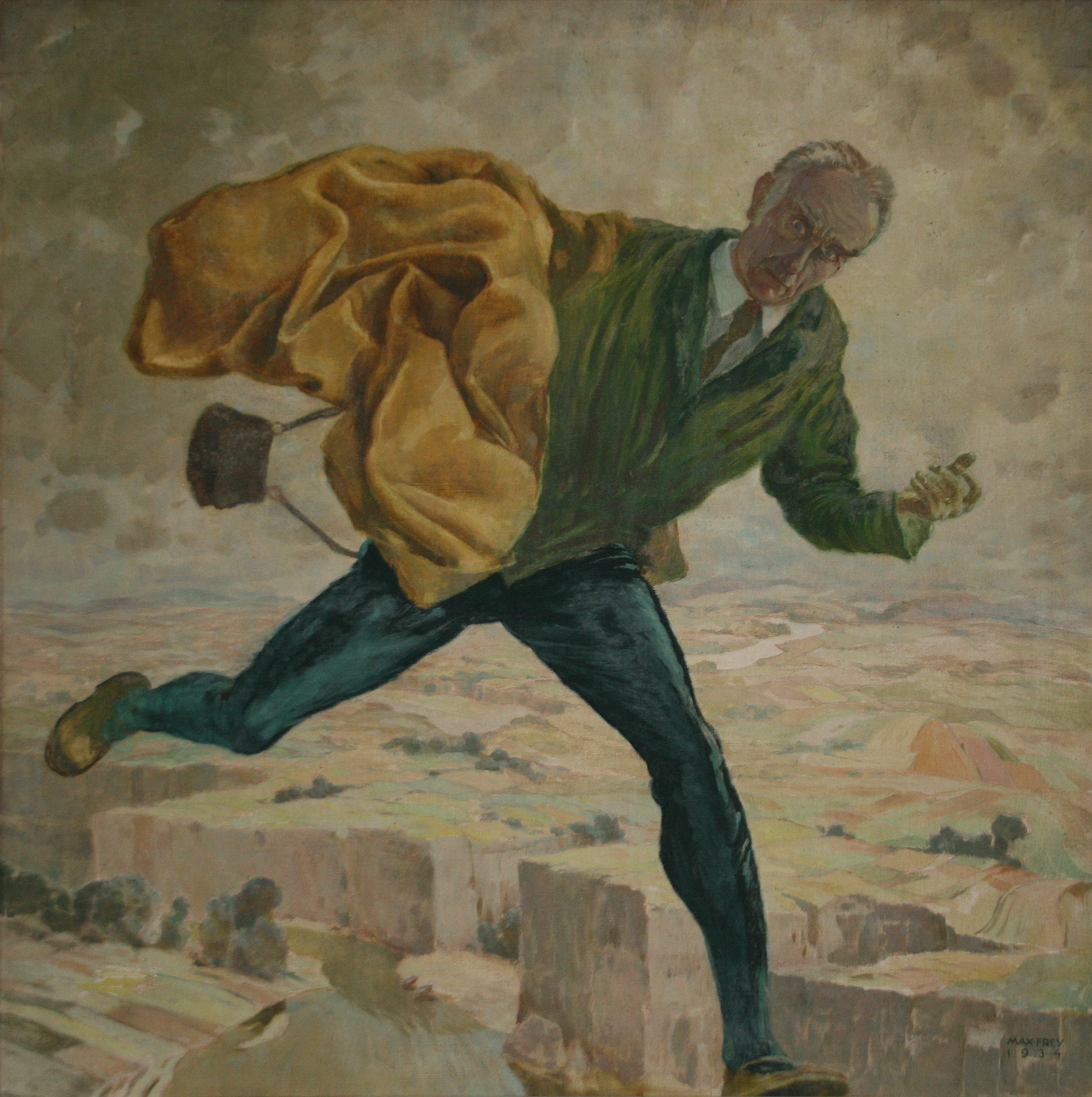
Continue! Upwards!
(Self-portrait)

== See also ==
- List of German painters
