= William Ronald =

Canadian painter

- Born: Willam Ronald Smith; August 13, 1926; Stratford, Ontario, Canada
- Died: February 9, 1998 (aged 71); Barrie, Ontario, Canada
- Known for: Abstract painter
- Movement: Painters Eleven
- Spouse: Helen Higgins

William Ronald Smith RCA (August 13, 1926 – February 9, 1998), known professionally as William Ronald, was a Canadian painter, best known as the founder of the influential Canadian abstract art group Painters Eleven in 1953 and for his abstract expressionist "central image" paintings. He was the older brother of painter John Meredith (1933–2000).

== Career ==
William Ronald was born in Stratford, Ontario, but he and his family moved to Fergus, Ontario where his father worked as a market gardener. When he was in his teens, he and his family moved to Brampton, Ontario. He attended the Ontario College of Art in Toronto, graduating in 1951. He worked as a display designer for the Robert Simpson Co. department store, starting in 1952. At the same time, he had begun to exhibit his abstract work with the Canadian Society of Painters in Water Colour, Ontario Society of Artists, the Canadian Group of Painters, the Royal Canadian Academy, and elsewhere. During these exhibitions he met other abstract artists such as Ray Mead.

At Simpsons in 1953, he persuaded management to pair abstract paintings with furniture displays in store windows (it was called the Abstracts at Home show and used the work of Ronald and his friends). He thereby discovered a way to get the public to accept non-representational art. With artist friends of a like mind, he founded Painters Eleven in 1953, the first abstract painting group in Ontario. Despite the success of the group, Ronald resented the city's general attitude toward its artists and moved to the United States in 1957, becoming an American citizen in 1963. Ronald joined the stable of artists at Manhattan's Kootz Gallery, where he was put on retainer and had seven solo shows. He was accepted by critics, collectors, and artists such as Franz Kline, and enjoyed a multi-year period of success.

Eventually, Ronald returned to Toronto, as a landed immigrant in the country of his birth, partly due to changing trends in the art market and partly because he could not get along with Kootz. In 1969, he painted a mural for the National Arts Centre, Ottawa. He was made a member of the Royal Canadian Academy of Arts in 1975.

Besides painting, he became known as a Canadian Broadcasting Corporation (CBC) journalist, hosting such shows as The Umbrella ending in 1966 and As It Happens (1969–1972), a columnist for the Toronto Telegram, and host of a Citytv variety show. He continued to paint through the 1970s, 1980s and 1990s, moving to Montreal, Quebec, and then to Barrie, Ontario where he maintained a studio. He gained some notoriety for his portrait series of Canadian prime ministers, a pioneering highly abstracted portrayal of heads of government opened by Prime Minister Pierre Trudeau in Toronto in 1984 at the Art Gallery of Ontario. The exhibition toured Canada, despite warnings not to exhibit the less than flattering portrait of then Prime Minister Brian Mulroney. Today, they are part of the permanent collection of the Kitchener-Waterloo Art Gallery in Kitchener, Ontario.

Never a stranger to criticism or polemics, Ronald loved to paint in public, frequently hiring strippers and showgirls to dance around him as he painted. He continued to paint until his death in 1998 and in fact suffered a heart attack while painting Untitled. He died a few days later on February 9, 1998.

== Selected exhibitions ==
- 1957–1960, 1962–1963: Kootz Gallery, New York City
- 1960: Laing Galleries, Toronto
- 1963: Isaacs Gallery, Toronto
- 1963: Princeton University Art Gallery
- 1965: David Mirvish Gallery, Toronto
- 1971: Tom Thomson Memorial Art Gallery, Owen Sound, Ontario
- 1975: Robert McLaughlin Gallery, Oshawa, Ontario
- 1975, 1977–1980: Morris Gallery, Toronto
- 1984: Art Gallery of Ontario, Toronto

== Selected collections ==
- Buffalo AKG Art Museum, Buffalo
- Art Gallery of Ontario, Toronto
- Art Institute of Chicago
- Brooklyn Museum, New York
- Guggenheim Museum, New York (purchased Earth, 1954, in 1958)
- Hirshhorn Museum, Smithsonian Institution, Washington
- Musée national des beaux-arts du Québec, Québec
- Museum of Modern Art, New York
- National Gallery of Canada, Ottawa
- Robert McLaughlin Gallery, Oshawa
- Whitney Museum of Art, New York

== Awards ==
- I.O.D.E. Scholarship, Canada (1951);
- Hallmark Art Award, NYC (1952);
- Canadian Amateur Hockey Assoc. Art Scholarship (1954);
- National Award, Canadian Section, International Guggenheim Awards (1956);
- 2nd Biennial Exhibition of Canadian Painting, National Gallery of Canada, Ott. (1957);
- Canada Council Senior Arts Award (1977)

== Legacy ==
The Estate of William Ronald was offered online in a Cowley Abbott Auction in 2023.
