= Duncan de Kergommeaux =

Canadian artist (1927–2024)

- Born: July 15, 1927; Premier, British Columbia, Canada
- Died: October 24, 2024 (aged 97); Ottawa, Ontario, Canada
- Education: Banff School of Fine Arts and with Jan Zack in Victoria, B.C.; Hans Hofmann Summer School of Fine Arts, Provincetown, Mass. (1955); Instituto Allende (1958)
- Known for: Artist
- Spouse: Mary Anne Carrières (1947–2017)

Duncan de Kergommeaux, RCA (July 15, 1927 – October 24, 2024) was a Canadian painter whose work veered between abstraction and representation. He is known for his grid or geometric paintings, his landscapes and his cow paintings.

== Early life and career ==
De Kergommeaux was born of Breton descent in Premier, British Columbia. In 1951, he attended the Banff School of Fine Arts and afterwards, studied with Jan Zack in Victoria. In 1953, he won the Victoria Times Mural Competition and in 1953, he moved to Ottawa.

In 1955, he studied with Hans Hofmann in his Summer School of Fine Arts in Provincetown, Massachusetts. He taught art classes in Ottawa in 1957 and, having won a Canada Council award, studied at Instituto Allende in Mexico in 1958. Further teaching followed. He taught at Carleton University and St. Patrick's College in Ottawa and then from 1970–1993 taught in the visual arts department at the University of Western Ontario, where he was Chair of the Department from 1981–1984. He received three full-year study leaves to work full-time on his artist practice in Paris and New York.

== Selected exhibitions ==
De Kergommeaux has had more than 50 solo exhibitions and over 100 group exhibitions since 1953. Among his early solo shows were: Art Gallery of Greater Victoria (1965); The Isaacs Gallery, Toronto (1965); Mcintosh Memorial Art Gallery, University of Western Ontario (1966); Confederation Centre Art Gallery, Charlottetown (1966); and the Gallery Denise Delrue, Montreal (1969).

He also exhibited at various Biennials of Canadian Art and at a show in the National Gallery of Canada (1967–1968) in a two-person touring exhibit.

De Kergommeaux had a solo exhibition of cow paintings at the Embassy Cultural House in 1983. Other survey exhibitions include: Duncan de Kergommeaux: An Art of Ordered Sensations curated by Matthew Teitelbaum in 1986 and Process Structure Meaning curated by José L. Bario-Garay in 1995 (both for Museum London); Gridlocked curated by Katie Cholette in 1999, Grid Paintings curated by Robert McKaskell in 2000 and These Are the Marks I Make: Duncan de Kergommeaux at the Ottawa Art Gallery and Museum London in 2010/11.

His estate is represented by Michael Gibson Gallery in London, Ontario.

== Selected public collections ==
His work is in the National Gallery of Canada, Museum London, Mcintosh Gallery, University of Western Ontario; the Art Gallery of Greater Victoria, and the Canada Council Art Bank.

In 1993, a collection of his work was established at Carleton University Art Gallery in Ottawa.

== Personal life and death ==
De Kergommeaux was married to Mary Anne Carrières (1947–2017). He died in Ottawa on October 24, 2024, at the age of 97.
