= Robert Wiens =

Canadian visual artist (born 1953)

Robert Wiens (born 1953 in Leamington, Ontario) is a Canadian visual artist.

== Biography ==
Robert Wiens was born in Leamington, Ontario in 1953, and currently lives in Picton, Ontario. He attended the New School of Art from 1973 to 1974, and had his first solo exhibition at Mercer Union in Toronto in 1980. Wiens' paintings and sculptures have been exhibited internationally. Recent exhibitions include Do Not Destroy: Trees, Art and Jewish Thought at The Contemporary Jewish Museum, San Francisco; Micro/Macro at Gallery Stratford, Stratford, Ontario and Doris McCarthy Gallery, Toronto; and Speak for the Trees, organized by Friesen Gallery in Seattle, Washington and Sun Valley, Idaho. Wiens has completed commissioned sculptures for the Open Corridor Festival in Windsor, Ontario and the Forest Art Project in Haliburton, Ontario. His work is held in public collections, including the National Gallery of Canada, Ottawa; Agnes Etherington Art Centre, Kingston; Four Seasons Hotel, Tokyo; Art Gallery of Ontario, Toronto, and Doris McCarthy Gallery, Toronto.

== Work ==
White Pine (2005) watercolour painting

Wiens' early work consisted of large-scale sculptures and installations, depicting fragments of heroic monuments. He used sculpture and installation to explore social issues and ideas of language and representation. He is perhaps best known for his large-scale watercolour close-ups of pine trees, which he began painting in 1996. The watercolours are detailed portraits of trees, including old-growth pines in Temagami, Ontario, and deciduous trees found in his local area. Wiens photographs the trees and then painstakingly reproduces their texture, colour and scale. The renderings are extremely detailed and dense. Wiens' tree portraits also function as memorials to, or remnants of the destruction of Canadian forests. As John Armstong writes in C Magazine, "Wiens creates, in his pinpoint framing and cool description, a chilly distance between the living trees and what we see in the gallery: he gestures both romance and the deadpan optics of a ledger. Without any didactic tone, these paintings chronicle a simultaneously grim and poetic politic."
