= Painters Eleven =

Canadian abstract artists collective

Painters Eleven (also known as Painters 11) was a group of abstract artists active in Canada between 1953 and 1960. They are associated with the Abstract Expressionist movement.

== History ==
Since the 1920s, artists in English Canada had been heavily influenced by the landscape painting of the Group of Seven, and starting in 1930s, the Canadian Group of Painters. The Canadian public often regarded modernist movements such as Cubism, Surrealism and Abstract Expressionism as bizarre and subversive. The acquisition of modernist paintings, even Impressionist works, by public galleries was invariably a source of controversy.

In Quebec, Paul-Émile Borduas and Jean-Paul Riopelle spearheaded the modernist collective known as Les Automatistes, as early as 1941. However, their artistic influence was not quickly felt in English Canada, or indeed much beyond Montreal.

Painters Eleven was the first abstract painting group in Ontario.

== Formation ==
In 1953, Toronto artists Oscar Cahén, Walter Yarwood, and Harold Town discussed the possibility of mounting a group show of abstract paintings to strengthen public appreciation of the contemporary art. A few weeks later, William Ronald assembled seven abstract painters from Ontario, his acquaintances from previous exhibitions, to participate in a display at Simpson's in Toronto where he worked as a commercial artist, of store windows juxtaposing modern Danish and reproduction French Provincial furniture with abstract and nonobjective painting. The seven artists brought together included Jack Bush, Oscar Cahén, Tom Hodgson, Alexandra Luke, Ray Mead, Kazuo Nakamura, and William Ronald.

The show was titled Abstracts at Home and a photographer named Everett Roseborough took a photograph of the seven to advertise the event that October. During the publicity photo shoot for the exhibition, Cahén proposed the group show idea, and a subsequent meeting at Alexandra Luke's cottage in Oshawa led to the inclusion of four other friends and acquaintances - Hortense Gordon, Jock Macdonald, Harold Town and Walter Yarwood. The number totalled 11.

Town dubbed them Painters Eleven. As he said: 'Let's not go any further - we don't want to be a joke."

== Exhibitions and artwork ==
Painters Eleven held their first exhibition at Roberts Gallery in Toronto in 1954. The exhibition, arranged by Jack Bush, was the first major commercial exhibition of nonobjective art in Toronto.

Unlike the Group of Seven whose members' work evolved along parallel lines, Painters Eleven did not share a common artistic vision as a group apart from a commitment to abstraction. This was reflected in the diversity of the group's members. Decades separated the youngest from the eldest, and before they sold their paintings they made their living as freelance commercial artists or worked in advertising and as art teachers. Two had studied at summer schools conducted by the American abstract expressionist Hans Hofmann and William Ronald "sat in" on his classes, while others were graduates of the Ontario College of Art, and still others were self-taught. Within the group itself, the artistic center of gravity seems to have been Oscar Cahén, a gifted European émigré who became known as an illustrator for a number of national magazines.

Stylistically speaking, Painters Eleven works were characterized by "rich colour and creamy impasto and impulsive spontaneous line" often accompanied by an introspective note. Kazuo Nakamura's abstract works were far more subdued than those of his colleagues, and he also created figurative paintings. Some art historians have speculated that Nakamura's mood in his work could have stemmed from his time in Tashme Incarceration Camp during the Second World War.

In Canada's conservative art world, their first exhibition was met with confusion and disdain, typical of new art movements throughout history. By their third exhibition, in 1957, they had established abstract expressionism in Canada. Painters Eleven attained U.S. exposure with a successful exhibition in 1956 with the American Abstract Artists at the Riverside Museum in New York City, although the group was still denigrated in Toronto. In 1957, they were praised by the influential New York critic Clement Greenberg on a visit he paid to the group in Toronto (Town and Yarwood abstained from meeting him). In the Canadian press, the group's most ardent supporters were art critic Robert Fulford and [art writer] Pearl McCarthy of the Globe and Mail. Eventually, the group's numbers were reduced by death and defection (Cahén was killed in a car accident in 1956, Ronald resigned in 1957 having moved to New York) and the group formally disbanded in 1960.

== Influence ==
Painters Eleven are credited with making English Canada's art-buying public more accustomed to abstract expressionist painting. Their influence on the next generation of Canadian artists was immense, and their art is now a prominent feature in public galleries and corporate and private collections throughout Canada and in many international collections. The largest collection of their works can be found at The Robert McLaughlin Gallery in Oshawa, Ontario. Some of the group's members, notably Jack Bush, William Ronald and Harold Town, went on to greater success in the 1960s and 1970s. Jack Bush was given a major exhibition at the Art Gallery of Ontario in 1976, Harold Town in 1986 and Kazuo Nakamura in 2004 and 2024. Works by the group's members are now fetching higher prices at Canadian fine art auctions. The last surviving member of the group, Tom Hodgson, a former Olympic canoeist and a dedicated abstract expressionist, died in 2006.

== Selected group exhibitions ==
- 1953: Abstracts at Home, Simpson's, Toronto;
- 1954: Roberts Gallery, Toronto;
- 1955: Roberts Gallery, Toronto;
- 1956: Riverside Museum, New York (with the American Abstract Artists);
- 1957: Park Gallery, Toronto;
- 1958: École des Beaux-Arts de Montréal;
- 1959: National Gallery of Canada, touring, 7 venues (Ronald absent);
- 1960: Stable Gallery, Montreal (Cahen and Ronald absent);
- 1971: Robert McLaughlin Gallery, Oshawa, Ont.;
- 1975: Tom Thomson Memorial Art Gallery, Owen Sound, Ont.;
- 1976: Kitchener-Waterloo Art Gallery, Kitchener, Ont.;
- 1978: The Gallery, Stratford, Ont.;
- 1979: Rodman Hall, St. Catharines, Ont.;
- 1979: Painters Eleven in Retrospect. Robert McLaughlin Gallery, Oshawa, Ontario;
- 1984: Cambridge Art Gallery and Library, Cambridge, Ont.;
- 1992: The Crisis of Abstraction in Canada, National Gallery of Canada, Ottawa.;
- 1994 and 1995: Robert McLaughlin Gallery, Oshawa, Ont.;
- 1999: Drabinsky Gallery, Toronto;
- 2003: Thielsen Gallery, London, Ont.;
- 2007: Thielsen Gallery, London, Ont.'
- 2009: (Painters Eleven exhibition with works in animation) Christopher Cutts Gallery, Toronto;
- 2010: Moore Gallery, Toronto, Ont.;
- 2010: Museum London, London, Ont.;

== Works ==
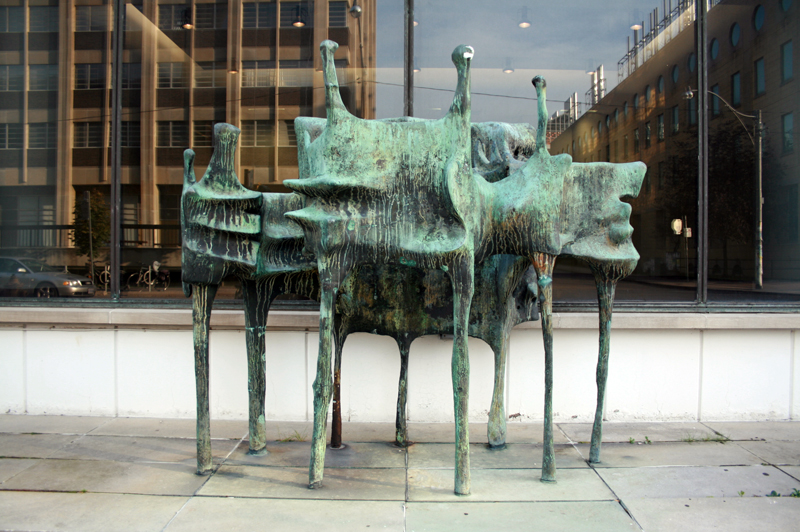
Walter Yarwood's Cedars.

== See also ==
- Canadian Group of Painters
- Eastern Group of Painters
- Group of Seven
- Indian Group of Seven
- Les Automatistes
- List of Canadian Artists
- Regina Five
- The Robert McLaughlin Gallery
