= Jock Macdonald =

Canadian artist (1897–1960)

- Born: James Williamson Galloway Macdonald; 31 May 1897; Thurso, Scotland
- Died: 3 December 1960 (aged 63); Toronto, Ontario
- Education: Edinburgh College of Art
- Known for: painter, educator
- Movement: Painters Eleven
- Spouse: Barbara Niece

James Williamson Galloway Macdonald (31 May 1897 – 3 December 1960), commonly known in his professional life as Jock Macdonald, was a member of Painters Eleven (Painters 11, or P11), whose goal was to promote abstract art in Canada. Macdonald was a trailblazer in Canadian art from the 1930s to 1960. He was the first painter to exhibit abstract art in Vancouver, and throughout his life he championed Canadian avant-garde artists at home and abroad. His career path reflected the times: despite his commitment to his artistic practice, he earned his living as a teacher, becoming a mentor to several generations of artists.

== Early life ==
Macdonald was born in May 1897 in Thurso, Scotland. Before coming to Canada, Macdonald graduated with a Specialists Teacher's Certificate from the Scottish Education Authority and a diploma in design from the Edinburgh College of Art in 1922. His first major employment was as a designer for a Scottish textile company, then he worked for the Lincoln School of Art as Head of Design in 1925.

== Career ==
After being recruited by Charles Hepburn Scott, Macdonald moved to Canada in 1926 to become a professor at the Vancouver School of Decorative and Applied Arts. He became well-known and respected as a teacher at art colleges in Canada at Vancouver, Calgary, and Toronto. Macdonald was initially inspired by the work of the Group of Seven and mentored by F.H. Varley, used bold colour and form to paint the British Columbia landscape but began painting abstracts in 1934. In 1941, he became president of the British Columbia Society of Artists and in that capacity attended the Kingston Conference which developed over time into the Canada Council for the Arts. Macdonald's training as a designer and his interest in children's paintings encouraged his experimentation with abstract art as did his interest in automatic painting. Automatic painting showed him an unexpected way to express all of the feelings which vanished if the approach was objective. He said:

"I felt that the curve of a wave, the breaker on the beach and the foam on the sand wasn`t all of the sea. The sea has solidity and transparency, cruelty and tenderness, joy and terror, cunning and friendship, all included in visual observation."

In the mid-1940s, Macdonald taught at the Banff School of Fine Arts. There, in 1946, he met Calgary artist Marion Nicoll, who was hired to teach the summer program, and exerted a profound influence on her work by introducing her to automatic drawing and watercolour.

In the summers of 1948 and 1949, Macdonald studied with Hans Hofmann in Provincetown, Massachusetts. In 1954, he worked and studied in Scotland, London and France. He settled in Nice where he showed his watercolours to Jean Dubuffet who advised him to "speak in oil as you do in watercolour". His breakthrough came when Harold Town introduced him to a new paint material, Lucite 44. The new freedom he found using this medium mixed with oil transformed his work. Through his paintings, encouraged by Clement Greenberg, he sought to convey abstract matters such as space and time. One writer speaks of their whisper of mysterious space and other-worldly concerns. Macdonald said:

"Artists must discover idioms which interptret man`s new concepts about nature, especially about the interrelationship of all things, the energies of motion, new spatial concepts."

Macdonald was an influential professor at several art colleges in Canada and helped spur the modern art movement in the country. He was made an associate member of the Royal Canadian Academy of Arts. He was a member of Painters Eleven as well as a charter member of the Canadian Group of Painters, a life member of the British Columbia Society of Artists, President of the Canadian Society of Painters in Water Colour in 1952, and an executive member of the Ontario Society of Artists that year. He had an important retrospective at the Art Gallery of Ontario, the first offered a living artist who was not a member of the Group of Seven.

Jock Macdonald died of a heart attack in Toronto in December 1960.

== Record sale prices ==
At the Cowley Abbott Auction, Important Canadian Art (Sale 2), December 1, 2022, lot 110, Drying Herring Roe (1938), oil on canvas, 28.25 x 32 ins (71.8 x 81.3 cms ), Auction Estimate: $50,000.00 - $70,000.00, realized a price of $408,000.00.

== Bibliography ==
- Zemans, Joyce. Jock Macdonald: Life & Work. Toronto: Art Canada Institute, 2016. ISBN 978-1-4871-0108-4
- Jacques, Michelle; Jansma, Linda; Thom, Ian M. (2014). Jock Macdonald: Evolving Form. Victoria, Oshawa and Vancouver: Black Dog Publishing Limited. ISBN 9781908966810.
- Thom, Ian M. (2014). "Jock Macdonald: A Biographical Sketch". Jock Macdonald: Evolving Form. Victoria, Oshawa and Vancouver: Black Dog Publishing Limited. pp. 9–13. ISBN 9781908966810.
- Nowell, Iris (2011). P11, Painters Eleven: The Wild Ones of Canadian Art. Douglas & McIntyre. ISBN 9781553655909.
