= Tom Hodgson =

Canadian sprint canoer & painter (1924–2006)

Thomas Hodgson
- Born: Thomas Sherlock Hodgson; June 5, 1924; Toronto, Ontario
- Died: February 27, 2006 (aged 81); Peterborough, Ontario
- Education: Central Technical School (1939–1943); Ontario College of Art (1945–1946)
- Known for: Painter
- Movement: Painters Eleven
- Spouse(s): Wilma Stein (m. 1947–1968) Catherine Good (m. 1978)
- Military career
- Allegiance: Canada
- Branch: Royal Canadian Air Force
- Service years: 1943-45
- Conflicts: World War II

Thomas Hodgson RCA (June 5, 1924 – February 27, 2006) was a Canadian sprint canoer who gained his first Canadian title in 1941 and competed in the 1950s, and also one of the acclaimed Canadian artists known as Painters Eleven. Competing in two Summer Olympics, he earned his best finish of eighth in the C-2 1000 m event at Helsinki in 1952.

== Career ==
Hodgson grew up on Toronto's Centre Island and started painting as a child. He attended Central Technical High School in Toronto, then in 1943 began to serve in the Royal Canadian Air Force during World War II. Discharged in 1945, he attended the Ontario College of Art.

Hodgson began working in advertising from 1948 to 1967 but at the same time, experimented as an artist, making watercolours and joining art societies such as the Ontario Society of Artists, the Royal Canadian Academy of Arts, the Canadian Group of Painters and the Canadian Society of Painters in Water Colour. By the early 1950s, he was experimenting with abstraction, and was invited to join Painters Eleven.

From 1968 to 1973, he taught at the Ontario College of Art. Afterwards, he taught at Art Space in Toronto.

A native of Toronto, he died in Peterborough of Alzheimer's disease on February 27, 2006.

== Work ==
His work is characterized by a large format, in bold colours and strokes of paint. One critic calls him the consummate gestural painter of the Eleven, gutsy and aggressive but finally, lyrical. He thought of abstraction as abstracting a feeling or memory of something rather than a record of nature.
