= Harold Town =

Canadian painter

- Born: Harold Barling Town; June 13, 1924; Toronto, Ontario
- Died: December 27, 1990 (aged 66); Peterborough, Ontario
- Education: Western Technical School, Ontario College of Art
- Known for: Painter, printmaker, illustrator
- Movement: Painters Eleven
- Spouse: Trudie Carol Tredwell (sep. 1989)
- Partner: Lynne St. David (1989-1990)

Harold Barling Town, OC D.Litt (June 13, 1924 – December 27, 1990) was a Canadian artist who worked in many different media and modes, but is best known for his abstract paintings.

He was a member of Painters Eleven, an abstract group of artists in Toronto (1954-1960). Town coined the name of the group, which was based simply on the number of artists that were present at the first meeting.

He also worked as an illustrator, a profession he credited with imparting a sense of discipline that would last throughout his entire artistic career. His early illustrative appeared in magazines such as Maclean's and Mayfair.

== Life and work ==
Harold Town was trained at Western Technical-Commercial School and the Ontario College of Art, both in Toronto. The Royal Ontario Museum gave him what he called a global horizon which influenced his commercial and abstract art. His early work also reflected his interest in Pablo Picasso and Willem de Kooning.

Gerta Moray in Harold Town: Life & Work described his collages as similar to his paintings, because in them he juxtaposed textures and fragments to startle the viewer.

Town's work moved from a dark expressionist style to abstraction in vivid colours, exploring a range of styles and media, using artistic traditions from other cultures to reflect his own experience.

In the 1960s, Town developed colourful monotype prints which he called Single Autographic Prints, a phrase he never explained. These won him awards in Ljubljana, Yugoslavia and Santiago, Chile, and the prints were acquired by the Museum of Modern Art in New York. Alfred Barr, then director of Museum of Modern Art, called Town one of the world's greatest printmakers. Roald Nasgaard describes these prints as being of great finesse and subtlety.

== Honours ==
In 1956 and 1964, Town and others represented Canada at the Venice Biennale. He also exhibited at the São Paulo Art Biennial in 1957 (receiving the Arno Award) and 1961. He became an associate member of the Royal Canadian Academy of Arts in 1958. York University granted him an honorary doctorate in 1966. He was made an Officer of the Order of Canada in 1968.

Town had retrospective exhibitions at the Art Gallery of Windsor in 1975 and the Art Gallery of Ontario in 1986.

In 1994, Town's home in Peterborough, Ontario was donated to Otonabee Conservation by Town's estate and the land was named Harold Town Conservation Area in his honour.

== Painters Eleven ==
In the late 1940s, Town joined Painters Eleven, but their early exhibitions were met with disdain. The Riverside Museum in New York hosted the Twentieth Annual Exhibition of American Abstract Artists with 'Painters Eleven' of Canada in 1956. A year later, American art critic Clement Greenberg paid a visit to Toronto, although Town would not see him. In the Canadian press, the group's most ardent supporters were Robert Fulford and Pearl McCarthy, art critic of the Globe and Mail.

== Record sale prices ==
In Cowley Abbott's Live Auction of Important Canadian & International Art, Nov. 27, 2024, Lot ##83 Variation on a Variation (1957), oil and lucite on board, 48.25 x 45 in ( 122.6 x 114.3 cm ), Auction Estimate: $18,000.00 - $22,000.00 realized a price of $66,000.00.
