= Robert McLaughlin Gallery =

The Robert McLaughlin Gallery
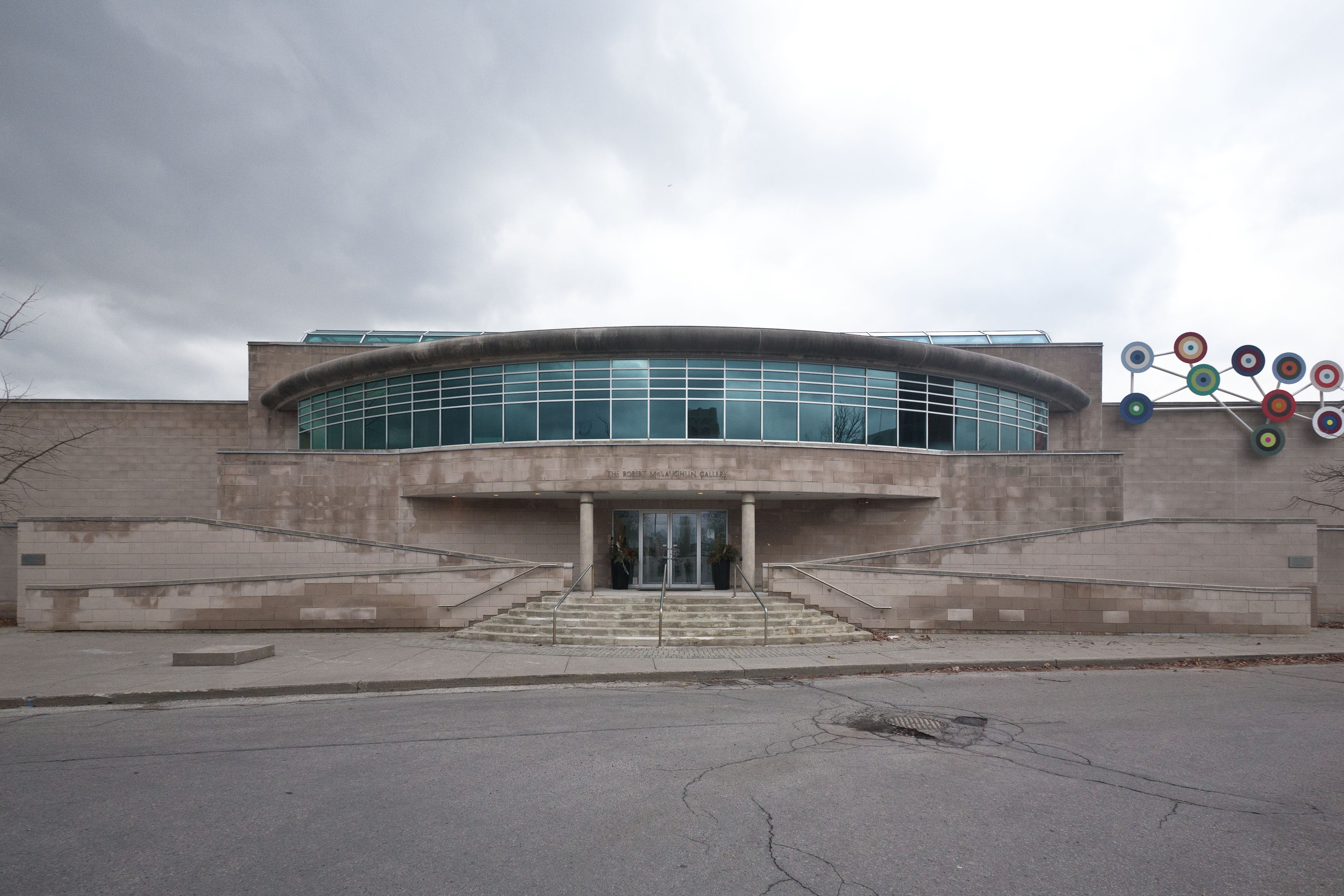

- Location in Southern Ontario
- Established: 1967
- Location: Oshawa, Ontario, Canada
- Coordinates: 43°53′43″N 78°51′56″W
- Type: Art museum
- CEO: Lauren Gould
- Parking: on site; free after 6 PM
- Website: www.rmg.on.ca

The Robert McLaughlin Gallery is a public art gallery in Oshawa, Ontario, Canada. It is the largest public art gallery in the Regional Municipality of Durham, of which Oshawa is a part. The gallery houses a significant collection of Canadian contemporary and modern artwork. Housed in a building designed by noted Canadian architect Arthur Erickson, the collection focuses on works by Painters Eleven, who were founded in the Oshawa studio of Painters Eleven member Alexandra Luke.

== History ==
Oshawa designer William Caldwell organized a group of artists to establish a commercial gallery space on Simcoe Street North, in Oshawa. Shortly thereafter, Ewart McLaughlin and his wife (known as Alexandra Luke, a member of Painters Eleven) offered financial support and a significant collection of works to help create the foundation of a public gallery for the city. The gallery was incorporated with the name of Ewart's grandfather, Robert McLaughlin, founder of the McLaughlin Carriage Company.

== Collection ==
The Robert McLaughlin Gallery's Permanent Collection numbers over 4,500 works. Dedicated to the collection, preservation, and exhibition of the best in Canada's art heritage, the gallery possesses an extensive selection of Canadian paintings, sculptures, and prints. The gallery also holds significant archives related to Painters Eleven, alongside the largest collection of works by Painters Eleven in Canada.

The gallery's dedication to abstract art can be connected to Alexandra Luke of Oshawa, Ontario, an artist who had studied with Hans Hofmann in Provincetown, Mass. Luke was an exponent of abstract art, and she organized a show of all abstract Canadian art in Ontario through the South Ontario Art Gallery Circuit. This exhibition opened in Oshawa at Adelaide House in October 1952. The collection had the distinction of being the first Canadian exhibition of abstract painting to be assembled in Canada on a national scale and devoted exclusively to this art form.
