= Paul Hutner =

Canadian painter (born 1948)

- Born: February 29, 1948; Toronto, Ontario
- Education: New School of Art, Toronto
- Known for: abstract painter
- Spouse: Martha Black (art historian) (d. 2024)

Paul Hutner (born February 29, 1948) is a Canadian abstract painter known for his use of a wide range of inspirational subjects in creating his expressive and large paintings.

== Biography ==
Paul Hutner was born in Toronto and from 1967 to 1969 attended Toronto's New School of Art, with teachers Gordon Rayner, Dennis Burton, Robert Markle and Ken Lywood. He began exhibiting his work in Toronto in 1969. At first, he was a conceptual and installation artist. He became a painter from observing exhibitions of American art at the David Mirvish Gallery where he worked for a short time as an assistant. In 1971, he exhibited his work at the Isaacs Gallery in Toronto. After that, his work was carried by the Dunkleman Gallery and Sable-Castelli Gallery in Toronto. In 1976, he was chosen to paint a mural for the Kirkland Lake Post Office.

Hutner is considered by art historians such as Roald Nasgaard to be a member of what has been described as the third generation of artists born in the 1940s who were inspired in their painting style by abstraction in New York, which meant, for Hutner, Cy Twombly and Jasper Johns.

Hutner moved to Victoria, B.C. with his wife Martha Black in 1990. Since then, his work, while still abstract, is more grounded in realism using a broader range of inspirational sources, now not only words but things such as "numbers, maps, images of popular culture, masks, landscapes, buildings, pottery, garden walls", which he composes into expressive dynamic wholes. In 2012, Winchester Modern Gallery in Victoria, BC exhibited a show of his work. Tragically, a month after the exhibition, Hutner's and Black's Saanich home was seriously damaged by fire.

In 2017, he had an exhibition at Polychome Fine Art in Victoria BC. In 2026, the Winnipeg Art Gallery organized the exhibition Chromatic Structures which included work by Hutner and Robert Sakowski to explore hard-edge and post-painterly abstraction in Canada from the 1970s to the late 1980s.

Hutner's Toronto documentation is preserved in his Artist's file in the E.P. Taylor Research Library and Archives, Art Gallery of Ontario (AGO) alongside his inclusion in programs such as the AGO's "Artists with their Work".

== Selected public collections ==
- National Gallery of Canada;
- Winnipeg Art Gallery;
