= Alex Cameron (artist) =

Canadian abstract landscape painter

- Born: May 6, 1947; Toronto
- Died: June 17, 2025 (aged 78)
- Education: New School of Art, Toronto with Gordon Rayner, Graham Coughtry, and Dennis Burton in 1967; studio assistant to Jack Bush (1972–1976)
- Spouse: Lorna Hawrysh

Alex Cameron (May 06, 1947 – June 17, 2025) was a painter living and working in Toronto, Ontario. He was a member of what has been described as the third generation of artists inspired in their painting style by Jack Bush. During the first part of his career, Cameron fashioned elegantly drawn shapes into abstractions; in the latter part of his career, influenced by Tom Thomson and the Group of Seven, he was inspired by landscape in his semi-abstract or totally abstract work.

== Biography ==
Cameron was born in Toronto but raised in the scenic Georgian Bay area of Perry Sound, ON. His mother was a painter and his uncle was a designer in New York City. While visiting his uncle in New York City, Cameron was introduced to American abstract expressionist painting. Cameron studied at the New School of Art with Graham Coughtry, Gordon Rayner, Dennis Burton and Robert Markle. While in school, Cameron focused on formal planning and carefully drawn sketches before applying paint to a canvas. In his early career, Cameron worked as a studio assistant to Jack Bush from 1972 to 1976. Bush is said to have influenced Cameron's "lyrical semi-abstract painting style", as well as his thick impasto application of paint. Through Bush, Cameron met and maintained an ongoing, close relationship with the art critic Clement Greenberg.

Inspired by artists such as Frank Stella, Bush, Painters Eleven and the Group of Seven, Cameron's paintings primarily featured brightly colored, abstractions, which can be seen in his later work as landscapes. According to Cameron, he began his career as an artist in 1969. The artist's early works in the 1970s were "flat, unmodulated fields of color transversed by sketchy cartoon-like drawing", sometimes influenced by working for over a decade as a mechanic for champion Formula 1 and 2 motorcycle racer, Miles Baldwin. In the early 1980s Cameron's style developed into the "long horizontal and vertical lines of color punctuated by curves, squiggles and free hand geometry" that can be seen in his later landscapes. "The suggestion of trees or horizon is often roughly preserved but the real business of the paintings is the rhythm of line, mass, depth and color".

What separates Cameron from other abstract artists is his concern with "creating the illusion of depth and dimension on a two-dimensional surface". He achieves this by creating a composition composed of a foreground, middle distance and distance. The distance usually contains a sunlit cloud-filled sky, the middle distance shows the watery surface of lakes or streams with a mountainous shore beyond. The foreground typically displays rocks, earth and vegetation.

Speaking of his own compositions, Alex Cameron described his skies as "colour fields", explaining that he "has a sky just so [he] can stick stuff in it". In his later work, Cameron spent his time painting going back and forth between landscapes and abstracts. This explains why abstract elements can often be found in the artist's landscapes.

With increased impasto, Cameron painted by "squeezing paint out of tubes in finger-width squiggles, dashes and dots". The artist churned out, on average, one painting a week, but was able to create pieces from start to finish very quickly. He was known to finish a 6 x 6 ft. work in one day. All of Cameron's titles were invented after the work was completed.

His process was a combination of painting en plein air and using his mind's eye to create his brightly coloured landscapes. Cameron traveled to the remote areas of the Northwest Territories, the Yukon, British Columbia, Algonquin Provincial Park and Nepal and India, often accompanied by David Bolduc. If Cameron was able, he would paint on the spot, or make tiny watercolour sketches to later work up in his Toronto studio. Alternatively, he held onto the images from his travels in his mind and transferred them to canvas, choosing the colours to portray the scenes in a different light. Cameron never painted from photographs, as he said they "give you too much information".

Cameron had over 40 solo exhibitions since his first show at A Space Gallery in Toronto in 1971. His work is in the permanent collections of the Art Gallery of Ontario, the Robert McLaughlin Gallery, Oshawa, and the Office of the Prime Minister of Canada, as well as numerous corporate and private collections. The 1970s were a momentous time in Alex Cameron's career. Cameron met Queen Elizabeth II of the United Kingdom during the 25th Jubilee celebrations and one of his paintings was presented to the Queen as a gift.

Alex Cameron's work is represented by Bau-Xi Gallery in Toronto and Vancouver, as well as Han Modern and Contemporary in Montreal.

Cameron had a stroke in 2012 which made his right arm useless, but continued to paint with one hand. In 2025, after another happy morning painting in his Toronto studio, Alex was badly injured when he tripped and fell at a nearby intersection. Rushed to hospital, he received excellent care but the large painting he was working on that morning, Big Dipper, will never be finished. He died on June 17, 2025 near his studio in Toronto.

Cameron had a street named after him in Sarnia, Ontario ("Alex Cameron Court").

== Selected solo exhibitions ==
Alex Cameron's first public show was at A Space in 1971.

- 1971 – A Space, Toronto, ON;
- 1980 – The Energy of Line and Colour, Art Gallery of Ontario, Toronto, ON;
- 1985 – Robert McLaughlin Gallery, Oshawa, ON;

Numerous shows followed at private art galleries such as Bau-Xi Gallery, Toronto and Vancouver.

== Selected public collections ==
- Art Gallery of Ontario, Toronto (Wheels for Johnny Staccato (1976);
- The Queen Elizabeth II's Silver Jubilee Art Collection;
- Beaverbrook Art Gallery, Fredericton;
- Judith and Norman Alix Gallery, Sarnia (3 works);
- Kitchener-Wayerloo Art Gallery;
- Office of the Prime Minister of Canada, Ottawa (3 works);
- The Robert McLaughlin Gallery, Oshawa (6 works);
- Tom Thomson Gallery, Owen Sound;
- University of Lethbridge Art Gallery (13 works);

Cameron's work is also in a large number of corporate collections.
