= Ann Clarke (artist) =

Canadian artist (born 1944)

- Born: Ann Frances Clarke; 27 August 1944 (age 81); Norwich, Norfolk, England
- Education: Slade School of Fine Art, University College, London University, (1962–1966)
- Awards: Canada Council grants (Senior in 1999); Ontario Arts Council grants; Government of Alberta Major Cultural Award (1974)
- Elected: member in 2008, Royal Canadian Academy
- Website: www.annclarke.ca

Ann Clarke RCA (born 1944) is a Canadian artist, who creates vibrant gestural abstract paintings and drawings which reveal her formal interests as well as a fascination with twenty-first century technologies. She is also an educator.

== Career ==
Clarke was born in Norwich, England and trained at the Slade School of Fine Art, University College, London University (1962–1966). In 1966, she won the Slade Painting Prize. She emigrated to Canada in 1968, settling in Edmonton, Alberta, then the centre of formalist abstraction in western Canada. As Ann Clarke Darrah (1968-1979), she became a prominent member of the art scene in Western Canada, soaking up the light and landscape like a sponge, as she said. In 1973, a workshop by Michael Steiner at the Edmonton Art Gallery confirmed her in her decision to be a painter and colourist. In New York in 1973, she visited the studio of Larry Poons and found it helpful in getting her more in touch with her materials. She was soon recognized as a key member of the group that had formed in Edmonton. In 1984, she moved from Alberta to Toronto and in 1991, settled in Tamworth, near Kingston. She moved in 1992 to Thunder Bay, Ontario but in 2013, returned to the Kingston area, to Newburgh, Ontario, where she and her son Ben Darrah have opened an art centre.

For Ann Clarke, art is a by-product of her journey through life and comes from the recesses of the subconscious. In 1967, she began making families of shapes and marks, things having relationships in her abstract work. On a trip to England in 1971, she was influenced by the large canvases of Mark Rothko, but the New York School of abstraction in general has been her heritage. Clarke’s paintings have fluctuated between the completely abstract and the more representational, but in her work since 1997, she is more interested in formal elements, especially composition and expressive colour. The key for her practice was a meeting with Clement Greenberg at a talk organized at the Edmonton Art Gallery in 1973; she would continue to maintain contact with him until 1987. He became a mentor who influenced her thought. Jack Bush too had an influence on her. She met him in 1977 during which the two artists discovered they had similar working methods. Both found their inspiration in the colour, shape or texture of things in nature. Besides that, Bush encouraged her to "go with her feelings". She felt "that he was like a master, handing on the baton". Since then, her work has gone through many permutations, but it always has maintained its abstract nature. She has had thirty solo exhibitions in Canada and has participated in more than ninety group shows. Her work is represented today by the Hatch Gallery in Bloomfield, Ontario. In 2004, Ann Clarke wrote, simply:

My work is painting.

== Selected solo exhibitions ==
- Ann Clarke Darrah. Edmonton Art Gallery, 1973
- Southern Alberta Art Gallery, Lethbridge (1979)
- Imagine: Ann Clarke, MacKenzie Art Gallery, Regina (1981)
- Ann Clarke, Agnes Etherington Art Centre, Kingston (1988)
- St. Lawrence College Art Gallery, Kingston (1990)
- Moving Beyond Structure, Thunder Bay Art Gallery, (2000), 30-year survey exhibition
- Ann Clarke: Paths of Desire, Prairie Art Gallery, Grande Prairie (2004)
- Ann Clarke: A Life in Motion, Agnes Etherington Art Centre, Kingston (2023)

== Selected group exhibitions ==
- Five Young Artists, Institute of Contemporary Arts, London, England (1966)
- The Slade, 1871–1971, Slade Centenary Exhibition, Royal Academy of Arts, London, England (1971)
- Changes, 11 Artists Working in the Prairies, MacKenzie Art Gallery, Regina (1975)
- Certain Traditions: Recent British and Canadian Art, British Council (toured England) (1978)
- Seven Prairie Painters, Art Gallery of Ontario, Toronto (1979)
- Twelve Canadian Artists, Robert McLaughlin Gallery, Oshawa (1980)
- Heritage of Jack Bush: A Tribute, Robert McLaughlin Gallery, Oshawa (1981)
- Kingston Women Artists Exhibition, Kingston (1990)
- Summer Survey, Thunder Bay Art Gallery (1993)
- Seeing through Modernism: Edmonton 1970–1985, Art Gallery of Alberta (2008)
- Toronto 70's Seen with Daniel Solomon, Paul Sloggett and Douglas Bentham, Hatch Gallery, Bloomfield, Ontario (2019)
- Hear Us Roar, 13th Street Gallery, St. Catharines (2021)
- Canada X 10 Revisited, Hatch Gallery, with Solomon and Bentham (2021)
- Unity Road Four, Kingston School of Art Window Gallery (2022)

== Collections ==
Her work is in public and private collections in Canada, Britain, the U.S.A. and Australia in the Queensland Art Gallery, Brisbane

== Memberships ==
Clarke was a founding member of CARFAC in Edmonton. In 2001, she was invited to participate in a Triangle Artists Workshop at OCAD. In 2008, Clarke was elected to membership of the Royal Canadian Academy of Art.

== Teaching ==
Clarke taught at the Banff Centre (1973, 1976, 1979), Nova Scotia College of Art and Design (1975–1976), the University of Alberta (1971–1980) and Red Deer College (1979–1980), Red Deer, Alberta. Later, she taught at Queen's University and St. Lawrence College in Kingston. In 1992, she received a full-time appointment in the Department of Visual Arts at Lakehead University in Thunder Bay. In her almost 20 years at Thunder Bay, she became a full professor and also served as Department chair before her retirement in 2009 as Professor Emerita.
