= David Mirvish Gallery =

- Established: September 1963
- Dissolved: 1978
- Location: 596 Markham Street, Toronto, Ontario
- Coordinates: 43.6640°N 79.4122°W
- Type: contemporary art gallery
- Owner: David Mirvish

David Mirvish Gallery was a contemporary, commercial art gallery run by David Mirvish, within the Markham Street art community in Mirvish Village in Toronto. It opened in 1963 and closed in 1978. Artists at the gallery were best known for Color Field and Post-painterly Abstraction works. Mirvish assembled the Mirvish Collection, consisting of mostly contemporary artwork including artists he represented, lending it out to museums around the United States and Europe after the gallery's closure. In 2012, Mirvish announced plans to open a gallery to display these works, at planned condominium project Mirvish+Gehry Toronto.

== History ==
=== Creation of Mirvish Village ===
David Mirvish's father, Ed Mirvish, was proprietor of Honest Ed's, a landmark discount retailer established in Toronto in 1948. In 1952, he purchased a house on Markham Street to expand backwards, using original tactics to thwart the area's residential zoning. In 1959, the ward's alderman was displeased by traffic jams near the store, and persuaded City Council to adopt a 1960 report urging the store to build a parking lot. The neighbourhood, which had originally supported the construction of a parking lot, now opposed rezoning to allow it under a new alderman. Mirvish could put a lot behind the Victorian houses, but could not tear them down.

Around the same time, David's mother Anne Mirvish spent five months studying sculpture at The New School in Greenwich Village, a result of the urging of artist Paul Burlin. As a youth, she painted and took art lessons, and her family were active in their appreciation of music. Upon marriage to Ed, those interests were largely displaced to help with the business. While Anne was away in New York City, David, who had just graduated from high school, told his father that he wanted to run an art gallery. Since Anne had wanted David to attend university, a decision was postponed until her return; after overcoming some initial shock, she endorsed his plan. Anne Mirvish intended to get a studio in the Gerrard Street Village, an artist's neighbourhood. Just then, the community was displaced for a new parking lot for the Toronto General Hospital.

Given the variety of factors, the Mirvishes began to convert the area into art galleries and studios. Among those who leased space was prominent art dealer Jack Pollock. During the renovations of the houses, long-time Mirvish associate Yale Simpson suggested owning both sides of the street would look better; Ed bought the remaining twelve houses, bringing the total to 23. Studios and galleries were joined by shops and restaurants. While the City had issues with its zoning for many years, the area was eventually named an official tourist attraction by the City, and designated Mirvish Village.

=== Operation ===
Frankly, I thought I could get paid for sitting in the back room and just reading. This sounded like a good profession. But, in fact, you don't get much time to read in the art world, except maybe art history. It turned out to be awfully exciting. By choice, I tended to show the same people year after year and didn't try to represent everything that was going on in the art world. I felt that most of the interesting painters were working in an abstract manner and this was the most difficult way to make a successful paintings at that time. So I concentrated on them ... I had the gallery in my younger, battling days, which were my more assertive, argumentative days. In the theatre, I'm in my more mellow, middle-aged period, where I'm involved with something that puts me in touch with many more people and where the scale is vastly different.

— David Mirvish, The Toronto Star, 15 May 1993, reflecting on the occasion of the opening of Princess of Wales Theatre, Toronto.

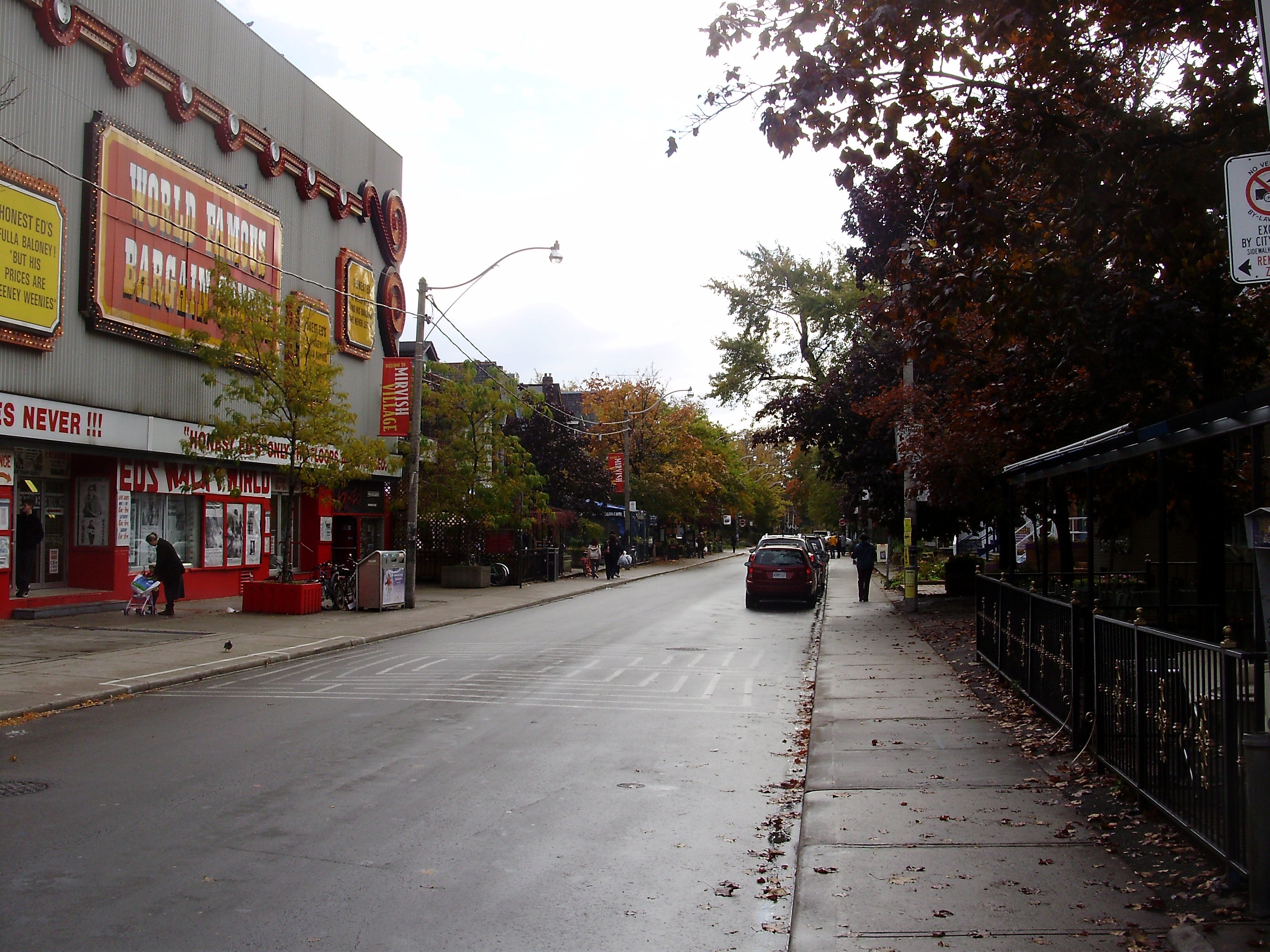
Mirvish Village, bordering on Honest Ed's, 2008.

David opened his gallery in one of the renovated houses in September 1963; his was one of the first businesses to open in the new Markham Street community. He was joined by other privately owned facilities, including Gallery Samou and Pollock Gallery. The Globe referred to the neighbourhood as "the Markham Street art community", but after the older Mirvish purchased the other side of the street, the area became known as Mirvish Village. Eventually, the neighbourhood would include boutiques, bookstores and restaurants.

Also in September 1963, Ed Mirvish opened the newly renovated Royal Alexandra Theatre, on King Street.

The first mention of the gallery in The Globe and Mail was a reference to a solo exhibition of works by Armand Flint. From the beginning, Alkis Klonaridis was director of the gallery. The gallery was under renovation from September to October 1964. As of reopening, the artists represented were Greg Curnoe, Helen Frankenthaler, Roy Kiyooka, Kenneth Lochhead, Douglas Morton, Kenneth Noland, Jules Olitski, Charles Robb, William Ronald, and Anton Van Dalen. Sheila Gladstone, wife of sculptor Gerald Gladstone, presented her first fashion collection at the gallery in November 1964.

Gallery operator Jane Corkin apprenticed under Mirvish. She purchased six $3000 photographs for the gallery at one point, feeling that they were "the most beautiful things I had ever seen." Corkin feared David Mirvish's reaction, given the fact there was no precedent for that price at the time, but he accepted Jane's reasoning. Toronto Life magazine noted that an André Kertész photograph in the set was "recently" sold for $300,000. Corkin established her own gallery in 1978, establishing herself as one of Canada's dealers in contemporary and historic photography. Abstract artist Daniel Solomon worked full-time as an attendant; he would eventually be represented by Mirvish and later Klonaridis.

Waddington Gallery in Yorkville opened in the late 1970s, taking over representation of Kenneth Noland and the estate of Jack Bush, the latter one of the most desired Canadian names in the United States' art market.

The styles of art that interested Mirvish were no longer popular by the late 1970s; The Globe and Mail noted dealers were forced to maintain price levels despite a smaller base of prospective collectors. Realizing that to maintain a business, he would have to change with the times, and that the artists he represented had established careers, he decided to let "others willing to take on the role of championing artists" do so, shuttering his gallery. Painter Tony Sherman was added to the gallery roster a week before the closure was announced. At this time, Mirvish became involved in his father's theatre management business, Mirvish Productions.

The Fine Arts department at York University took over the gallery's building for four months, beginning in December 1978, as part of their outreach program. The project was underwritten by both David and Ed Mirvish. Later articles still called the York facility "Mirvish Gallery", despite the different focus, noting it was part of York University Fine Arts Markham (YUFAM).

Klonaridis decided to create a new gallery at an "unfashionable address" in Toronto's "downtown warehouse area", centered on core Canadian artists at Mirvish and some New York artists. David Bolduc, Paul Fournier, Erik Gamble, K. M. Graham, Robert Murray, Tony Sherman, Paul Sloggett, and Daniel Solomon all followed Klonaridis. Klonaridis Gallery opened at University Avenue and Front Street, closing in 1992 due to illness.

==== Artists displayed ====
The following artists had work on display at the gallery:

- Milton Avery
- Walter Darby Bannard
- Jack Bush
- Anthony Caro
- Lynne Connell
- Greg Curnoe
- Claude Girard
- Helen Frankenthaler
- Robert Fulford
- André Kertész
- Roy Kiyooka
- Stanley Hirshenson
- Les Levine
- Hans Hofmann
- Kenneth Lochhead
- Robert Mallary
- Douglas Morton
- Robert Motherwell
- Bob Murray
- Kenneth Noland
- Jules Olitski
- George Ortman
- Larry Poons
- Charles Robb
- Daniel Solomon
- Ray Spiers
- Milly Ristvedt

David Mirvish Gallery on occasion showed works from public collections, including "Sculpture in Steel", organized by the Edmonton Art Gallery.

== Mirvish Collection ==
David Mirvish personally collected a great deal of contemporary abstract art. After his art dealership closed, selections from his collection were displayed at the same Markham Street structure. As of 1993, the collection was variably described as either closed to the public or viewable on appointment. Anne Mirvish had another building in Mirvish Village to store her sculptures.

Artists collected include Jack Bush, Anthony Caro, Helen Frankenthaler, Morris Louis, Robert Motherwell, Kenneth Noland, Jules Olitski, Larry Poons, David Smith, and Frank Stella. Mirvish has donated works to the National Gallery of Canada, serving on their board from 1993 to 1997. as well as loaning works to public collections. The Fort Worth Art Museum presented "Grand compositions: selections from the collection of David Mirvish" in 1985.

=== Mirvish+Gehry Toronto, with gallery ===
In 2012, Mirvish announced a new condominium project designed by Frank Gehry, an acclaimed Canadian-born architect, dubbed Mirvish+Gehry Toronto. The project would necessitate the demolition of designated heritage properties at 274, 276, 284, and 322 King Street West, including the Princess of Wales Theatre. Located far south of Mirvish Village, the area was largely revitalized thanks to Ed Mirvish's investment in the Royal Alexandria and Poor Alex Theatres, and restaurant and shops leased or owned in the surrounding area. The Princess of Wales itself was the first privately funded and owned theatre in Canada to be built since 1907. The new complex would include facilities and a gallery for OCAD University, as well as a 60,000 square foot free gallery for Mirvish and his wife Audrey's collection. The project has yet to be approved by the City. Unlike previous privately founded Toronto museums (Bata Shoe Museum, Gardiner Museum), the gallery project is largely dependent on the sale of 2700 condominiums.

The project has received mixed reaction. While suggesting the development should be elsewhere, the founder of Doors Open Toronto noted to Spacing that Mirvish was the first honorary chair of the event, and the family company was noted for its preservation of heritage structures.

=== Planned sale of Mirvish Village ===
In 2013, David Mirvish announced that the family was selling not only Honest Ed's, but the entire 1.8-hectare parcel of land the family owned, including Mirvish Village. Unconfirmed reports suggested a $100 million asking price, but no sale had been made, and no demolition would happen within a three-year period. Indeed, at the time, there was a one-year freeze on retail development on Bathurst. At the time of the announcement, there were nearly 70 businesses. Some business owners started a petition to get the area named a Heritage Conservation District.
