= Anita Aarons =

Australian artist (1912–2000)

- Born: 6 November 1912; Sydney, Australia
- Died: 3 January 2000 (aged 87); Brisbane, Australia
- Education: Sydney National Art School
- Occupations: Artist and designer

Anita Aarons (6 November 1912 – 3 January 2000) was an Australian-Canadian artist, designer, administrator and educator.

== Life ==
Born in Sydney, Aarons studied at the East Sydney Technical College and the National Art School in Sydney before moving to New York City in 1964 as an observer and artist in the print studio of Columbia University. She exhibited work in venues in the United States, Canada, and Australia. She taught sculpture and crafts in a number of institutions, and designed stained glass windows, furniture, and jewelry, in addition to working as a sculptor. Collections which include examples of her work include the Charlottetown National Craft Collection and the National Collection of the Canadian Craftsmen Guild in Toronto.

On 25 June 1951, Aarons was invited to attend a meeting of the City of Sydney's Health and Recreations Committee to discuss her submission to erect a piece of sculpture in the children's playground of Phillip Park. The Council approved the submission on 2 October 1951. The sculpture was removed on 2 April 1952.

In 1965 she became a critic for the Royal Architectural Institute of Canada's Journal RAIC, writing a column titled "Allied Arts" about the role of craft in architecture.

From 1976 until she resigned in 1984, she was both a founder and director of the Harborfront Art Gallery, Toronto. In 1983, she was awarded the Diplome d'Honneur from the Canadian Conference of the Arts.

Aarons returned to Australia at the end of her life and settled in Brisbane, where she died on 3 January 2000.

== Legacy ==
The Art Gallery of Ontario's Special Collections holds a small collection of sixteen audio recordings of Anita Aarons interviewing figures of Canadian art or world figures active in the 1970s and 1980s. These include Ron Bloore, Graham Coughtry, Dorothy Cameron, Guido Molinari, Yves Gaucher, Ted Bieler, Gordon Rayner, and Jack Pollock.

Aarons also has work, "Year of the Moon," that is also held by the Art Gallery of NSW.
