= David Bolduc =

Canadian abstract painter (1945-2010)

- Born: February 10, 1945; Toronto, Ontario, Canada
- Died: April 8, 2010 (aged 65); Brockville, Ontario, Canada
- Education: Artists Workshop, Toronto; Ontario College of Art, Toronto (1962–63); School of Art and Design at the Montreal Museum of Fine Arts with Arthur Lismer and Jean Goguen (1964–65)
- Spouse(s): Candace Coates; Blaise DeLong
- Awards: Canada Council grant (1968)

David Bolduc (1945–2010) was an abstract artist who used colour and central imagery in his paintings, inspired by artists such as Jack Bush. Critics suggest that he and artists such as Daniel Solomon formed a bridge between the second and third generations of Toronto modernists or even form part of the third generation of Toronto abstract painters which includes artists such as Alex Cameron and Paul Sloggett.

== Early life ==
The son of Eugenie and Bernard Bolduc, he attended the Ontario College of Art, Toronto (1962–1963) and the School of Art and Design at the Montreal Museum of Fine Arts, studying with Arthur Lismer and Jean Goguen (1964–1965). While in Montreal, he was given a solo exhibition at the city's Elysee Theatre and included in a group showing at Galerie Soixante. To earn money, Bolduc worked part time in a plastics factory. In 1966, he returned to Toronto and worked in the Royal Ontario Museum's conservation department, his only full-time job except for painting.

In 1970, Bolduc attended a major retrospective exhibition of Henri Matisse in Paris. It had 208 paintings, 28 sculptures, 13 gouaches and the monumental designs for the stained‐glass windows for the chapel of Vence as well as a ceramic wall executed after Matisse's specifications. Matisse provided a model for what Bolduc wanted, Bolduc said, "To be complex within what would seem to be a simple structure".

== Career ==
In 1967, his work featured groupings of shaped canvases with contoured surfaces carrying simple geometric colour designs. He subsequently abandoned colour to work with minimal constructions of stretched white vinyl and then with simple structures made of rope, wood, and mirrors.

By the mid-1970s, Bolduc had developed his personal territory, central imagery abstracts. Bolduc's signature as a painter was a main motif articulated in impasto colour drawn directly from the tube on top of a stained background. Bolduc once said that for him the

"vertical member – a figure, a tree, a stamen, a column, a mast, a pylon, a stele, a stack of colours, a line of organizational force, an armature upon which the rest of the painting was wound – began as the hands of a watch, both of them pointing straight upward to midnight".

He also compared it with grass, although by that he meant grass as it is found in a Persian miniature or in a Matisse cutout.

These canvases incorporated a bold central image which, at times, was repeated across the canvas. The main motif, described by Bolduc as a carrier for colour, was rendered in bright colours and set upon a textured backdrop. Bolduc remarked on his use of colour:

"I'm interested in taking a nothing colour and giving it some bite to make it warmer. I'm not trying to be innovative. I'm not trying to make an object you haven't seen before. Colour is all that I am working with".

Bolduc drew inspiration for his painting from different exotic locales and travelled often to attain it, such as his 1968 trip across Europe to Turkey, overland to Nepal, returning home via Uzbekistan and Moscow. He went to India (at least 15 times), Turkey, Mexico, North Africa, China, the Himalayas, Sri Lanka, Costa Rica, Paris, Spain, Portugal. For several years in the 1990s, Bolduc lived and worked in Paris and Morocco. In Canada, Bolduc and his friend Alex Cameron made regular trips to the Rockies and Newfoundland.

Bolduc was a lifelong student of modern poetry, and he provided illustrations for numerous volumes of poetry, often for his friend Michael Ondaatje as well as for Roy Kiyooka, Wayne Clifford, Victor Coleman, and David Rosenberg. Bolduc was also a regular contributor of illustrations for the biannual literary magazine Brick, edited by Michael Ondaatje and Bolduc's wife, the writer Linda Spalding. He also was an educator working at New School, Toronto, Ontario (1976–1977); York University (1971–1975); Ontario College of Art, Painting, Sculpture Department (1972–1975, 1980); Concordia University, Montreal, Quebec, Visiting Associate Professor (1986); also at other universities in Canada.

His death followed a diagnosis of brain cancer in September 2009.

== Selected exhibitions ==
Bolduc showed his work in Toronto at the commercial gallery of Carmen Lamanna from 1967 until 1975. When Bolduc decided to leave the dealer, Lamanna decided to keep most of Bolduc's unsold paintings. Naturally, Bolduc asked for them back. Lamanna refused. Bolduc hired a lawyer to sue for the return of his work, but there are different accounts about whether the suit succeeded.

Shows of the mid-1970s which drew together significant groupings of Toronto's abstract painters featured Bolduc, along with other painters such as Daniel Solomon. The most important international exhibition in which Bolduc's work was featured occurred in 1977. It was called 14 Canadians: a Critic's Choice, and the exhibition was held at the Hirshhorn Museum in Washington, DC, curated by Andrew Hudson. For the exhibitors, it was of primary importance.

In 1976, Bolduc exhibited at the David Mirvish Gallery and, when it closed in 1977, with Alkis Klonaridis, who opened his own gallery after working for Mirvish. Later, Bolduc was affiliated for 27 years with Calgary's Paul Kuhn Gallery.

A memorial show in May 2010 was held at Christopher Cutts Gallery in Toronto. Between 1968 and 2008, there was only one year – 1994 – in which new work was not featured in a solo or group exhibit.

== Selected public collections ==
Bolduc's paintings can be found in major collections across Canada, including the National Gallery of Canada, the Art Gallery of Ontario, the Art Gallery of Alberta, as well as the Mirvish Collection.

== Bibliography ==
- Nasgaard, Roald (2008). Abstract Painting in Canada. Douglas & McIntyre. p. 249. ISBN 9781553653943.
