= Paul Sloggett =

Canadian abstract painter (born 1950)

- Born: Paul Gerald Sloggett; August 7, 1950 (age 76); Campbellford, Ontario, Canada
- Education: Ontario College of Art (1969–73) with Dennis Burton, Head of the Painting department in his second year; AOCA (Associate of the Ontario College of Art)
- Spouse: Cairrine Ellen Sloggett (b. 1951) (married 1973)
- Awards: awarded an OCAD Teaching Assistantship Scholarship to work under the direction of Royden Rabinowitch, chair of Experimental Art (1974); Canada Council grants; Ontario Arts Council grants
- Elected: member in 2001, Royal Canadian Academy of Arts

Paul Sloggett RCA (born August 7, 1950) is a Canadian abstract painter known for his use of geometric shapes and patterns in creating paintings and for his many teaching and administrative appointments at OCAD University, Toronto, where he served as a full professor since 2001 and as Assistant Dean of the Faculty of Art. He now teaches at Seneca Polytechnic.

== Biography ==
Sloggett was born in Campbellford, Ontario and grew up in Oshawa, where he attended McLaughlin Collegiate in 1969–1970. He was directed into his career by his art teacher at McLaughlin, Murray Hofstetter. His early work was influenced by shows at the Robert McLaughlin Gallery in Oshawa and specifically by one work by Richard Diebenkorn shown by the gallery. In 1987, the gallery curated the travelling exhibition, Paul Sloggett: Twelve Years. Sloggett still has a connection to Oshawa. In 2016, he was invited to exhibit New Paintings in 2016 in the University of Ontario Institute of Technology's Regent Theatre in Oshawa at the reception for a screening of the video Water Colour. He lives and has his studio in nearby Newcastle, Ontario.

Sloggett is a member of what has been described as the third generation of artist (along with artists such as Paul Hutner) inspired in their painting style by Painters Eleven in Ontario as well as painters in New York which meant, for Sloggett, Frank Stella and Kenneth Noland. He was a second-year student at the Ontario College of Art (OCAD) when Dennis Burton became head of the painting and drawing department in 1970. Burton hired for the department painters such as Graham Coughtry and Gordon Rayner that were Sloggett's teachers. Sloggett also knew and admired Jack Bush. From the time he graduated, his art work has followed a consistent course: works which emphasized the picture-as-object with strongly asserted geometric shapes combined with spatial illusions in works on canvas, in collage on paper or in prints. He sometimes has been called a Neo-Constructivist, but a painterly one.

Sloggett's art was recognized for its innovations while still a student at the Ontario College of Art. Upon graduation, he was awarded an OCAD Teaching Assistantship Scholarship to work under the direction of Royden Rabinowitch, chair of Experimental Art (1974). His work on the painting scene was quickly noted as remarkable, even "astounding" for its paint quality by Art International magazine. Geometric structure is his method towards making work. "I always felt as if I was building paintings as opposed to painting pictures”, he has said. The Art Gallery of Ontario included his work in Four Canadian painters, (1976) and it was featured again in 1977 in 14 Canadians: a Critic's Choice, an exhibition held at the Hirshhorn Museum in Washington, DC, curated by Andrew Hudson. In 1980, Sloggett changed the shape of his canvases to reflect his ongoing interest in sculptural qualities in his work. The faceted nature of the works which followed came from looking at diagrams of basic rock, mineral and crystal structures.

Sloggett showed with David Mirvish Gallery (closed in 1977), then with Klonarides Inc., and then with Moore Gallery in Toronto. The Art Gallery of Peterborough held a show of his more recent work in 2000. From 2017 on, he showed with Hatch Gallery, Bloomfield, Prince Edward County. In 2020, he showed his work with that of Daniel Solomon at the 13th Street Gallery (now Mann Gallery), St. Catharines. Besides numerous solo exhibitions, he has participated in group exhibitions, and created site-specific installations in New York City (1986) and in Salt Lake City, Utah (1988). In 2019, he gave a lecture at OCAD University, Paul Sloggett: A Life in Art, a survey of the artist's experiences as a member of the Toronto arts community and his life as a professor at OCAD University. Slogett is represented by the Hatch Gallery, Bloomfield, Ontario.

== Public collections ==
- Art Gallery of Alberta, Edmonton, Alberta
- Art Gallery of Hamilton, Ontario
- Art Gallery of Ontario, Toronto
- Art Gallery of Peterborough, Ontario
- Beaverbrook Art Gallery, Fredericton, New Brunswick
- Canada Council Art Bank, Ottawa
- Concordia Art Gallery, Montreal
- Museum London, Ontario
- Robert McLaughlin Gallery, Oshawa, Ontario
