= Sloggett =

Sloggett is a surname. Notable people with the surname include:

- Arthur Sloggett (1857–1929), British doctor and army officer
- Nellie Sloggett (1851–1923), author and folklorist
- Paul Sloggett (born 1950), Canadian abstract artist
