= Daniel Solomon =

Canadian abstract painter and sculptor (born 1945)

- Born: Daniel Lee Solomon; July 13, 1945 (age 81); Topeka, Kansas, USA
- Education: courses in drawing, painting and sculpture while studying for Bsc, University of Oregon, School of Architecture (1963-1967), Eugene, Oregon, mentored by Morris Yarowsky
- Spouse(s): Martha Ladly (born 1955), married 2012
- Awards: Canada Council grants (1970, 1972, 1980, 1995)

Daniel Solomon (born 1945) is an abstract painter who uses intense, vibrant colour in his work, combined with complex, pictorial space, inspired by artists such as Jack Bush and is a painter and professor in Drawing and Painting at OCAD University.

Critics such as Roald Nasgaard suggest that Solomon and David Bolduc formed a bridge between the second and third generations of Toronto modernists or even form part of the third generation of Toronto abstract painters which includes artists such as Alex Cameron and Paul Sloggett.

== Biography ==
Solomon was born in Topeka, Kansas but grew up in Salem, Oregon, through high school. In 1963, he went to the University of Oregon to study architecture and, as part of that program, took drawing, painting and sculpture. In 1967, he emigrated to Canada, to Toronto, where, in 1970, he began teaching at the Ontario College of Art. Paul Sloggett was a student in the first class that he taught.

Solomon found his signature style in 1970 when he learned to trust the movement of his own body to create the visual handwriting in his paintings. He varied his work of the early 1970s to create paintings that are pattern pictures, pared-down canvases, or paintings that use over-scaled brushstrokes that float across the canvas, a motif he continues to favour.

== Selected exhibitions ==
By the mid-1970s, Solomon was featured, usually along with David Bolduc, in the shows which drew together significant groupings of Toronto's abstract painters, such as Canada x Ten (1974) (Art Gallery of Alberta) curated by Karen Wilkin; and David Mirvish Gallery: a Selection of Paintings in Toronto (1976) which featured Jack Bush, along with Solomon and Bolduc.

The most important international exhibition in which Solomon's work was featured occurred in 1977. It was called 14 Canadians: a Critic`s Choice, and the exhibition was held at the Hirshhorn Museum in Washington, DC, curated by Andrew Hudson. For the artists who participated at least, it was of primary importance.

Since then, Solomon has shown his work in numerous galleries, both in solo and group exhibitions, in Canada and internationally. In Toronto, he exhibited with David Mirvish Gallery (closed in 1977), then with Klonarides Inc., and then with Moore Gallery. In Montreal, he exhibited with Elca London Gallery. From 2020 on, he has shown new work with Paul Sloggett at The 13th Street Gallery (now Mann Gallery) in St. Catharines, Ontario as well as Hatch Gallery.

== Selected public collections ==
Solomons's paintings and sculptures can be found in major public collections across Canada, including the Art Gallery of Ontario, Toronto, the Agnes Etherington Art Centre, Kingston, and the Robert McLaughlin Gallery, Oshawa.

== Commissions ==
Solomon has had commissions, notably an outdoor painted mural on the Flatiron Building, Toronto (1971) and an outdoor painted metal sculpture, Martha's Vineyard, installed at the 13th Street Winery, Ste. Catharines, Ontario (2013). He has also created designs for dance and theatre sets for the duMaurier Theatre in Toronto (1992, 1998), among others.
