= Martha Black (art historian) =

Canadian art historian (1945–2024)

- Born: 18 July 1945; New Westminster, British Columbia, Canada
- Died: 7 January 2024 (aged 78); Victoria, British Columbia, Canada
- Education: MA (York University); PhD (University of Victoria)
- Spouse: Paul Hutner

Martha Black (18 July 1945 – 7 January 2024) was a Canadian art historian who specialized in Northwest Coast art and issues in museum management and repatriation. Black authored a number of articles and a book on Heiltsuk and Nuu-chah-nulth art, and issues related to repatriation outside of the treaty process. She was the curator of the Indigenous Collection at the Royal British Columbia Museum.

== Biography ==
Black was born in New Westminster, BC. She was for 20 years Curator and Associate Director of The Isaacs Gallery Ltd. in Toronto, specializing in contemporary Canadian art, where her interest in and knowledge of First Nations Art was begun. She received her MA in interdisciplinary studies from York University in Toronto, Ontario.

In 1990, she moved with her husband, Paul Hutner, to Victoria, British Columbia and then completed a PhD in art history at the University of Victoria in British Columbia. Both degrees were focused on Heiltsuk art and museum collections. Black worked with the Heiltsuk community, both in her research and in the collaborative museum exhibit Kaxlaya Gvilas at the Royal Ontario Museum. As she wrote:

"The Royal Ontario Museum holds a major but little-known collection of Northwest coast native art and artifacts acquired by the Reverend Dr. Richard Whitfield Large at Bella Bella, British Columbia between 1899 and 1906. Although the R. W. Large Collection is one of the most important Heiltsuk collections in existence because of its unique documentation, there had never been a comprehensive study of it".

Black undertook a study of the collection in her 1997 book Bella Bella: A Season of Heiltsuk Art and worked with the Heiltsuk to produce an art exhibit based on the collection with a number of contemporary pieces. She described the collection gathered in Bella Bella by the Missionary doctor R. W. Large. The collection, unusual for its associated information allowed Black to provide biological information about five named Heiltsuk artists.

The exhibit Kaxlaya Gvi'ilas was a partnership between the Heiltsuk, the Museum of Anthropology at the University of British Columbia, the Royal Ontario Museum, and Black. A collaborative exhibit, it contained a combination of historical works from the Royal Ontario Museum's R.W. Large Collection and contemporary artwork from the Heiltsuk village of Waglisla (Bella Bella). The exhibit traveled after its initial showing in the Royal Ontario Museum to Vancouver (MOA 2002), to Montreal at the McCord Museum, followed then to Owen Sound, Ontario.

Black curated a number of exhibitions at the Royal British Columbia Museum, including Nłuut’iksa Łagigyedm Ts’msyeen: Treasures of the Tsimshian from the Dundas Collection (2007), Huupukwanum · Tupaat: Out of the Mist, Treasures of the Nuu-chah-nulth Chiefs (1999), Nisga’a: People of the Nass River (2001) and Argillite: A Haida Art (2001), and was co-curator of the Royal Ontario Museum's travelling exhibition, Kaxlaya Gvilas: "the ones who uphold the laws of our ancestors" (2000).

Black died from cancer in Victoria, British Columbia, on 7 January 2024, at the age of 78.

== See also ==
- Heiltsuk
- Northwest Coast art
- Royal Ontario Museum

== Works ==
- Black, Martha. Bella Bella: A Season of Heiltsuk Art. Royal Ontario Museum. 1997. ISBN 1-55054-556-6
- Black, Martha. Out of the Mist: Treasures of the Nuu-chah-nuulth Chiefs. 1999. ISBN 978-0-7718-9547-0
