= Pflug =

Pflug (eng. Plough) is a German-language surname. Notable people with the surname include:

- Christiane Pflug (1936–1972), German-born Canadian painter
- Eva Pflug (1929–2008), German actress
- Jo Ann Pflug (born 1940), American actress
- Johann Baptist Pflug (1785–1866), German painter
- Julius von Pflug (1499–1564), German Catholic bishop
- Monika Pflug (born 1954), German speed skater
