= Gar Smith =

Canadian artist

Gar Smith (born 1946) is a Canadian artist. His work is in the collections of National Gallery of Canada, the Art Gallery of Guelph, and the Canada Council Art Bank, among other collections.

== Early life and career ==
Gar Smith was born in 1946 in Toronto, Ontario, and attended the University of Toronto's School of Architecture from 1965 to 1968. His first solo exhibition, Notes on Light, 1969–70, was held at the Isaacs Gallery in 1970. The exhibition consisted of 1200 projected photographs of sunrises and sunsets taken in 30 equidistant locations across Canada. It was later exhibited at the National Gallery of Canada. Smith continued to exhibit regularly at the Isaacs Gallery throughout the 1970s and 80s, and had over nine solo exhibitions in the space between 1970 and 1985. His work has also been shown at the Paris Biennale, the Art Gallery of Ontario, the Cité internationale des arts, the Vancouver Art Gallery, and the Winnipeg Art Gallery, among others. In 1989, his work was featured on the cover of Canadian Art magazine. He had been represented by the Isaacs Gallery in Toronto.

== Work ==
Smith worked in a range of mediums including sculpture, film, and photography. He produced a large body of "camera-less photo works" throughout the 1970s and early 1980s, including mural-sized photograms, works made by exposing photosensitive paper to laser light and the light of television screens, and works made by painting photographic fixes and developers directly onto photosensitive paper.

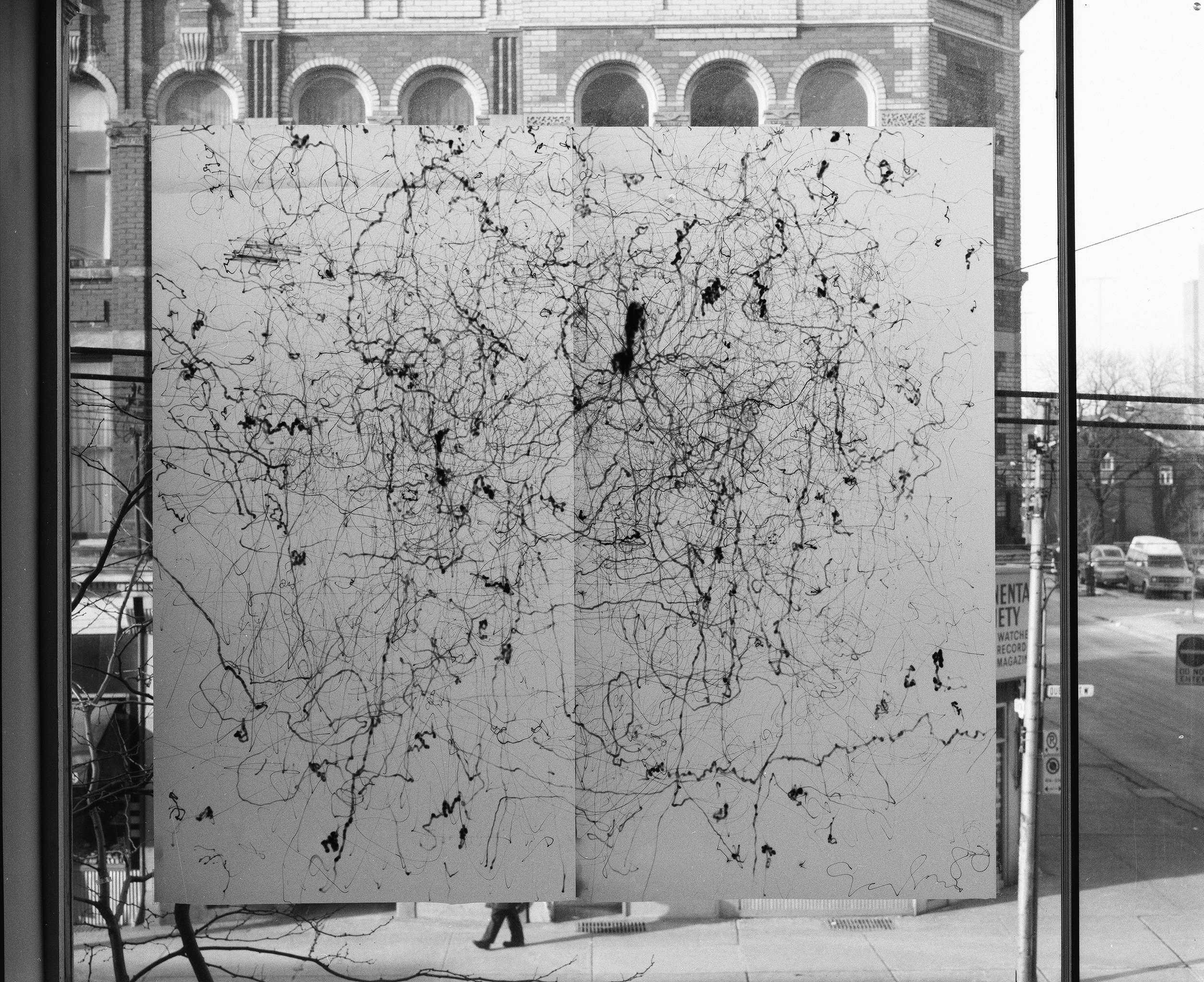
Photodrawing made with laser light on photopaper from Gar Smith: Photosynthesis: Photodrawings exhibition, YYZ, 1979.

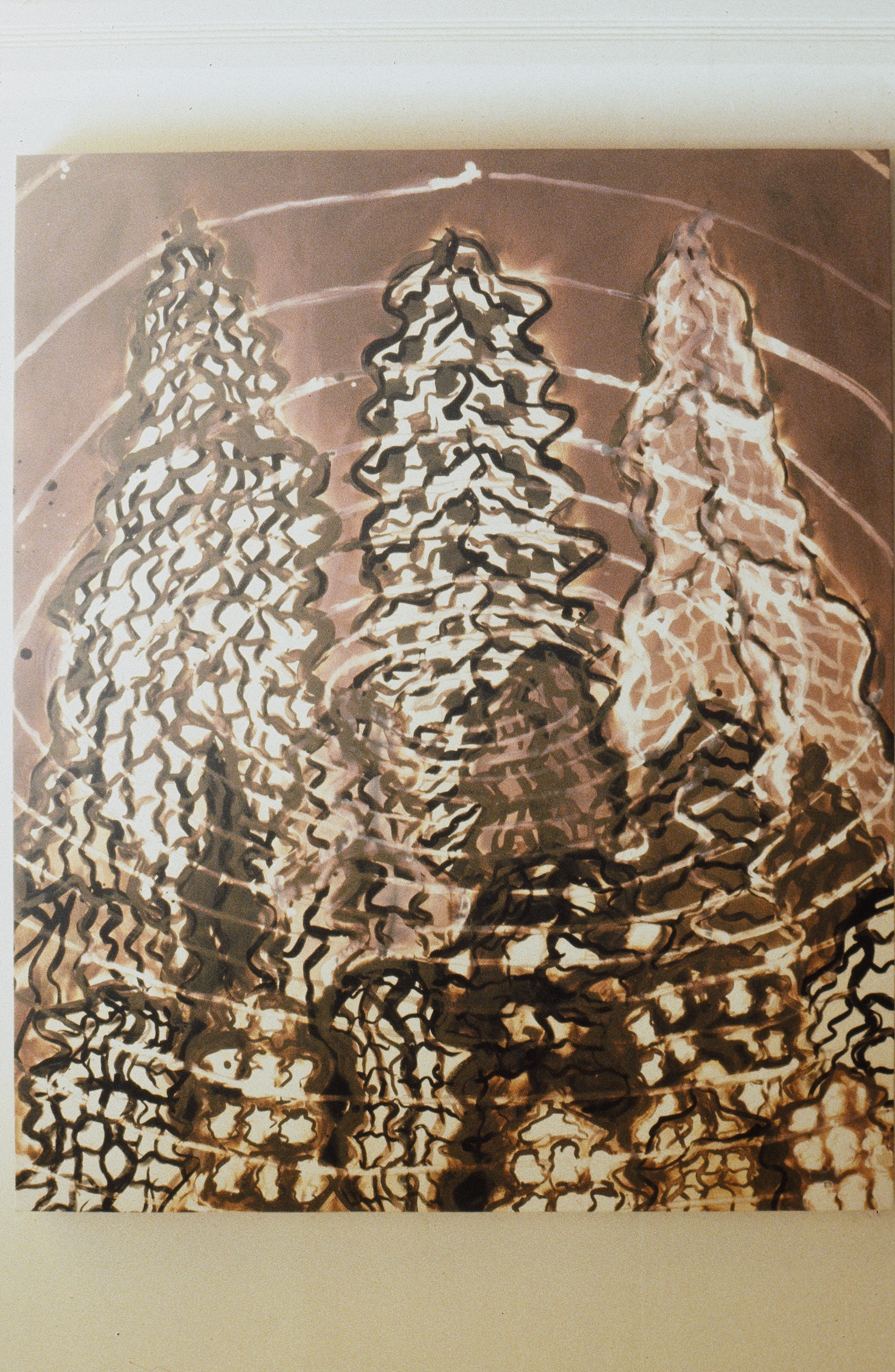
Work by Gar Smith from 1983 Urban Nature Series. Photochemicals on B&W photopaper.

Bells were also a recurring motif in Smith's work. In his 1975 sculptural installation The Food of Love, he created a series of bells made of cast-brass Duralex dishes. In his 1985 installation I Give Bliss, I Give Warning, he created a series of cast-bronze bells in a variety of architectural shapes including a cathedral spire, a grain elevator, a smokestack, a skyscaper, a lighthouse, a missile shell, and a plinth.

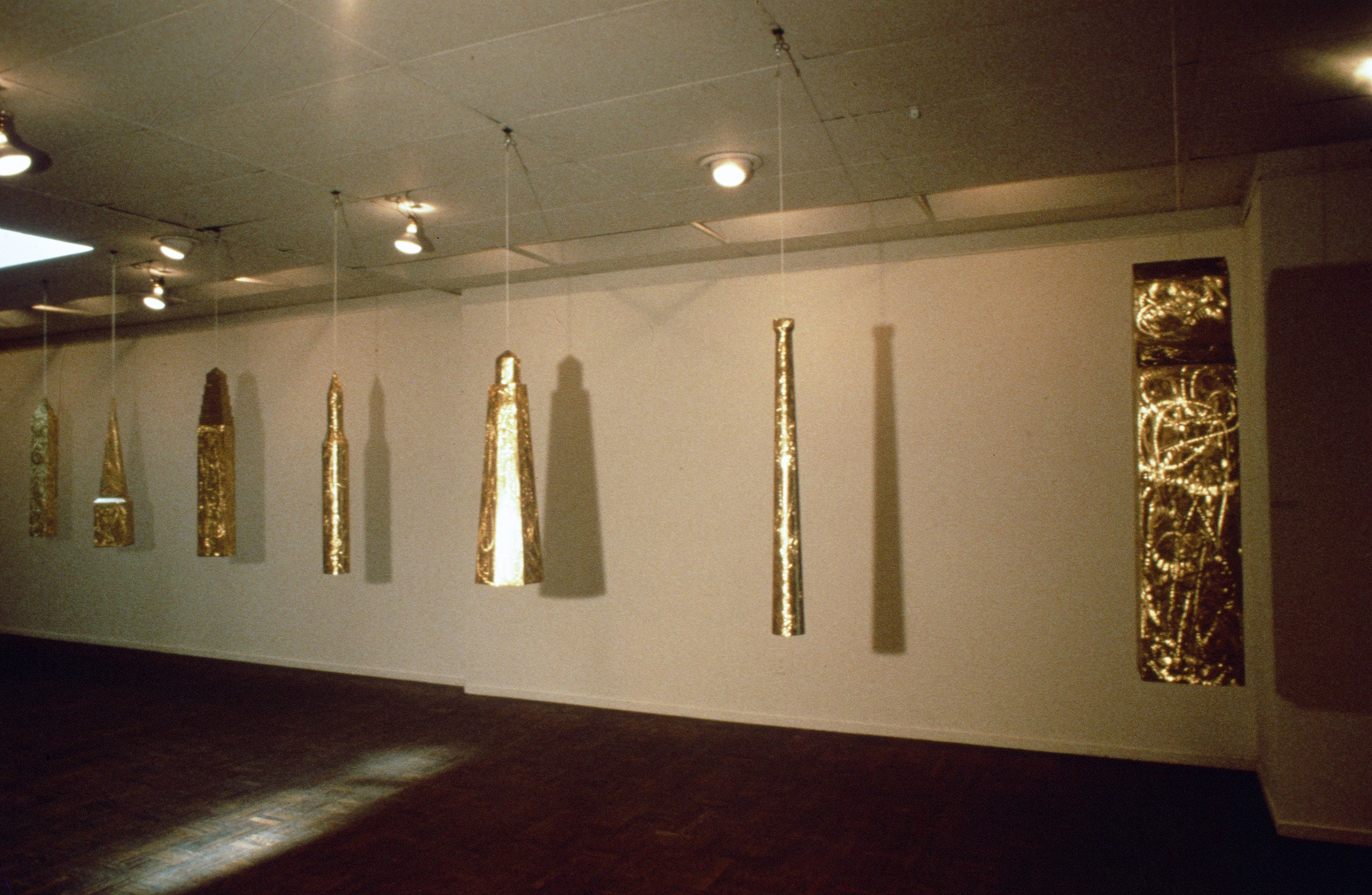
Installation view from Gar Smith exhibition I Give Bliss, I Give Warning held at the Isaacs Gallery, 1983.

== Sculpture commission for the Canadian embassy in Tokyo ==
Smith also designed two sculptures for the Canadian embassy in Tokyo designed by Moriyama & Teshima architects. Titled Arc and Bow, they consisted of two large metal arcs embossed with the textures of rock and tree bark, respectively.

== Collections ==
Smith's work is held in the permanent collections of the Oakland Museum of California, the Winnipeg Art Gallery, and the Art Gallery of Guelph.
