= Graham Coughtry =

Canadian abstract painter (1931–1999)

- Born: John Graham Coughtry; June 8, 1931; Saint-Lambert, Quebec
- Died: January 13, 1999 (aged 67); Toronto, Ontario, Canada
- Education: Ontario College of Art, Toronto (1949–1953)
- Spouse: Larisa Pavlychenko (married 1960)
- Awards: Canada Council Junior and Senior Fellowships (1959–1965)

Graham Coughtry (June 6, 1931 – January 13, 1999), was a Canadian modernist figurative painter.

== Biography ==
Coughtry was born in Saint-Lambert, Quebec, on June 8, 1931. He learned to paint at the Montreal Museum of Fine Arts School, then attended the Ontario College of Art, graduating in 1953 with a travelling scholarship. Abroad, he travelled to Ibiza, an island which is part of the Balearic group, which would in time become his home. In Toronto again, he worked with Graphics Associates as a film graphic designer for television and later with the television department of the Canadian Broadcasting Company until 1959.

In 1955, he had his first exhibition with Michael Snow at Toronto's Hart House, University of Toronto (now the Justina Barnicke Gallery). Figure on a Bed, a thickly painted study of an interior space, influenced by his favourite artist, the French Post-Impressionist Pierre Bonnard, was bought by the Art Gallery of Ontario. His first one-man show with the Isaacs Gallery was in 1956 and he continued to show with the Isaacs thereafter. For that reason, he has been called one of the Isaacs Group of artists which includes Michael Snow, Joyce Wieland, Gordon Rayner and John Meredith, among others. He also was a founding member of the Artists' Jazz Band, along with Nobuo Kubota, Robert Markle, Dennis Burton and Richard Gorman, formed in 1962.

His national reputation was made with semi-abstract paintings that showed one or two figures floating in space, but, as he said, colour came first, along with heavy impasto. In some of the canvases the figure might be hardly perceptible. In the years which followed, he continued to create this crucial subject of art for himself while exploring different media.

In 1960, with Edmund Alleyn, Jean Paul Lemieux, Frances Loring, and Albert Dumouchel, he represented Canada at the Venice Biennale. In 1962, he painted a major mural at the Toronto Pearson International Airport. He was elected to the Canadian Group of Painters and Canadian Society of Graphic Art.

Coughtry died on January 13, 1999, in Toronto, at the age of 67.

== Selected public collections ==
- Art Gallery of Ontario, Toronto
- The Canada Council Art Bank Collection
- Detroit Institute of Arts
- MacKenzie Art Gallery, Regina
- Montreal Museum of Fine Arts
- Museum of Modern Art, New York
- National Gallery of Canada, Ottawa
- The Robert McLaughlin Gallery, Oshawa
- Vancouver Art Gallery

== Awards ==
- 1975 Victor Martyn Lynch-Staunton Award
