= Marguerite Andersen =

German-born Canadian writer (1924–2022)

Marguerite Andersen CM
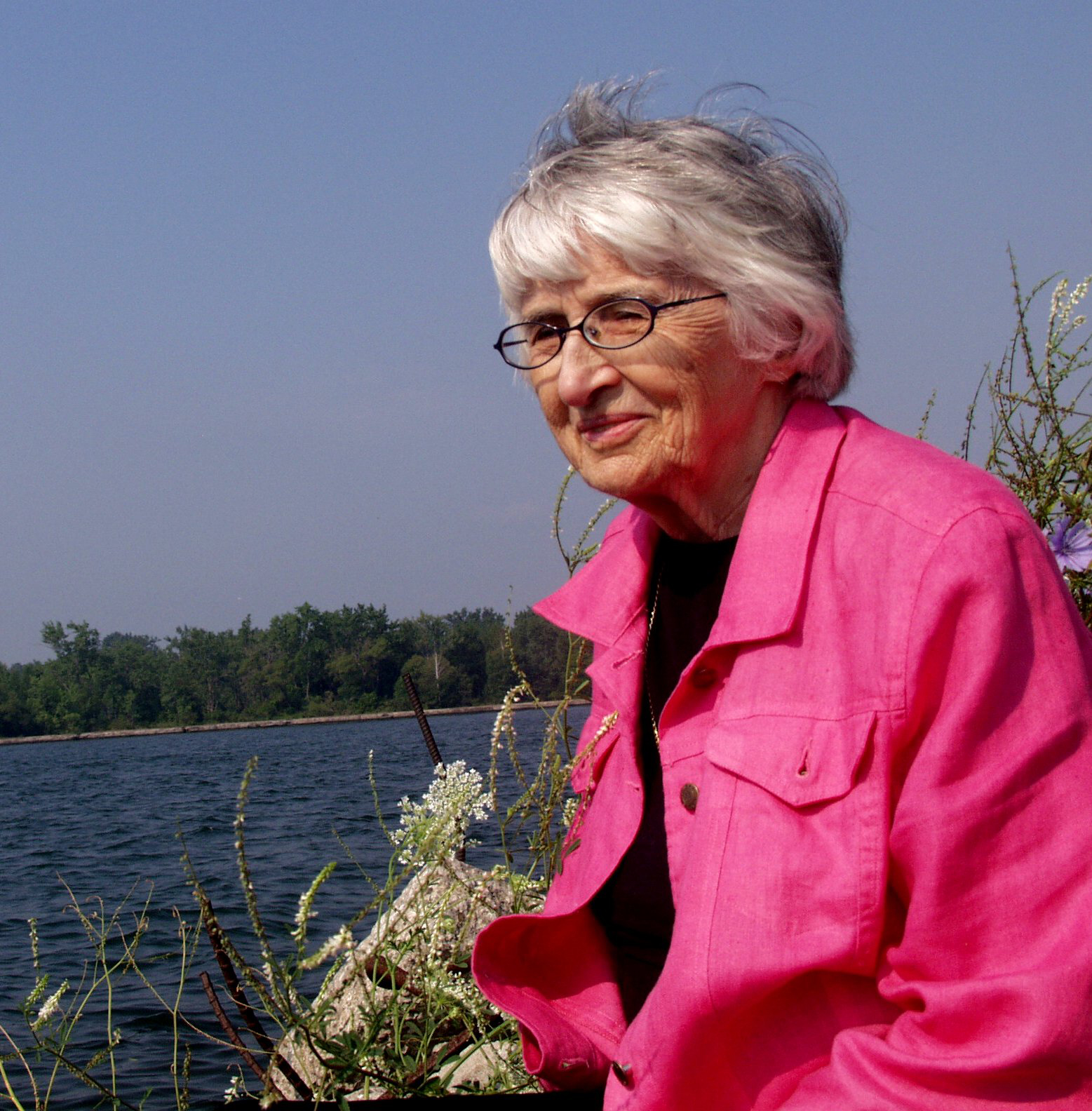
- Marguerite Andersen in 2006
- Born: October 15, 1924; Germany
- Died: October 1, 2022 (aged 97)
- Education: Université de Montréal (PhD)
- Occupations: Novelist; poet; professor
- Writing career
- Notable works: Le figuier sur le toit; La mauvaise mère

Marguerite Andersen CM (October 15, 1924 – October 1, 2022) was a German-born Canadian francophone writer and educator writer, who was based in Toronto, Ontario, where she was a teacher at the Toronto Linden School.

== Life and career ==
Andersen was born in Germany and received the Staatsexamen at the Free University of Berlin and studied at France's Sorbonne. She came to Canada in 1958 after living in various countries such as England, Ethiopia, Tunisia and the United States. Her Ph.D. in French Studies is from the Université de Montréal.

Andersen also taught at Concordia University, Mount St. Vincent University and the University of Guelph.

In 1996, Andersen produced a play at Factory Theatre in Toronto called Stations in a Painter's Life about German-born Canadian artist Christiane Pflug, based on the life of the artist until her suicide in 1972.

From 1998, she was editor for the quarterly French literary journal Virages ISSN 1203-8792.

Andersen won the 2009 French-language Trillium Award, category "Prix de poésie Trillium" for her book Le figuier sur le toit and 2014 in the category "Prix du livre d'enfant Trillium" for La mauvaise mère.

In December 2016, Andersen was named a Member of the Order of Canada.

Andersen died on October 1, 2022, at the age of 97.

== Selected works ==
- 1965: Paul Claudel et l'Allemagne (Presses de l'Université d'Ottawa)
- 1972: Mother was not a person (Content Publishing/Blank Rose Books)
- 1975: Paroles Rebelles ISBN 2-89091-112-8 (reissued 1992; with Christine Klein-Lataud; Éditions du Remue-ménage)
- 1982: De mémoire de femme ISBN 2-89026-313-4 (Quinze)
- 1984: L'Autrement pareille ISBN 0-920814-63-8 (Prise de Parole)
- 1991: Courts Métrages et Instantanés ISBN 2-89423-007-9 (Prise de Parole)
- 1992: L'Homme-papier ISBN 2-89091-117-9 (Editions du Remue-ménage)
- 1993: La chambre noire du bonheur ISBN 2-89045-990-X (Hurtubuise HMH)
- 1994: Conversations dans l'Interzone ISBN 2-89423-051-6 (Prise de Parole)
- 1995: La Soupe ISBN 2-89423-062-1, ISBN 2-89031-229-1 (won 1996 Grand Prix du Salon du livre de Toronto; Triptyque)
- 1997: La Bicyclette ISBN 2-89423-086-9, ISBN 2-921706-63-6 (Centre FORA)
- 1998: Le Crus de l'Esplanade ISBN 2-89423-093-1 (Prise de Parole)
- 2000: Bleu sur Blanc ISBN 2-89423-118-0 (Prise de Parole)
- 2003: Dreaming our Space ISBN 1-55071-152-0 (Guernica)
- 2004: Parallèles ISBN 2-89423-168-7 (Prise de Parole)
- 2006: Doucement le bonheur (Gently happiness) ISBN 978-2-89423-206-4 (Prise de Parole); about the events surrounding the 1929-30 trials of MP Louis-Mathias Auger for rape, and a fictionalized account of the protagonists later lives
- 2009: Le figuier sur le toit ISBN 9782923274492 (Les Éditions l'Interligne)
- 2011: La vie devant elles ISBN 978-2-89423-277-4 (Prise de Parole)
- 2013: La mauvaise mère ISBN 9782894239063 (Prise de Parole)

== Theatre ==
- 1996: Christiane : Stations in a Painter's Life*, Festival The Gathering, Factory Theatre, Toronto, 1996.
- 1996–97: La Fête, Prix O'Neill-Karsh, mises en lecture Théâtre La Catapulte, Ottawa, 1997 et Théâtre du Nouvel-Ontario, Sudbury, 1996.

== See also ==
- Canadian literature
- Canadian poetry
- List of Canadian poets
- List of Canadian writers
