= Christiane Pflug =

German-born Canadian painter and draughtswoman

- Born: Sybille Christiane Schütt; 20 June 1936; Berlin, Germany
- Died: 4 April 1972 (aged 35); Toronto, Ontario, Canada
- Known for: Painting, Drawing
- Style: Magic Realism
- Spouse: Michael Pflug (m. 1956)

Christiane Pflug (June 20, 1936 – April 4, 1972) was a German-born Canadian painter and draughtswoman. In her career, she painted landscapes, interiors and still lifes, as well as the occasional portrait.

== Biography ==
Born in Berlin in 1936, Pflug was the daughter of Regine Schütt, a Berlin fashion designer who was involved with anti-Nazi groups around Werner Dissel and Harro Schulze-Boysen in the early 1930s. Born out of wedlock and distanced from her father's family, Christiane was a shy and introverted child. When war broke out, Pflug lived with various family members and friends outside of Berlin to avoid the bombings. From 1941–1949, she lived with Frau Petzold, an authoritarian and very religious foster mother; during this time Pflug escaped into her own world of books, paper, and crayons. In 1949, Pflug was reunited with her mother who was then living in Frankfurt. Here, Pflug regularly visited the Städel Museum and made ink drawings of the views from her apartment window, beginning a life-long interest in framed landscapes. Pflug relocated to Paris in 1953 to study fashion design. While in Paris, she met her future husband, Michael Pflug, who influenced and encouraged her career as an artist. Christiane and Michael married in 1956 and soon after had two daughters, Esther and Ursula. The Pflugs moved to Tunis, Tunisia, for a brief period while Michael completed a medical internship. Pflug continued painting landscapes and still lifes in Tunis, in their house and in her studio.

In September 1958, Pflug and her daughters moved to Munich, Germany, and then in February 1959 they settled in Toronto, Ontario, Canada, joining Pflug's mother who was already living there. Michael joined them in 1960 and began his medical practice in Toronto. It was in Toronto that Christiane Pflug painted her most recognizable "series, including; city landscapes from her window, a series of interiors with dolls, and larger portraits of her daughter and her art dealer, Avrom Isaacs of Isaacs Gallery".

With little formal training behind her, Pflug continued to paint her everyday environs in a style that has been labelled magic realist.

Kitchen Door with Ursula (1966) is a prime example of her later style. Here, the viewer looks through the open kitchen door of Pflug's apartment onto an urban winter scene, but the glass panes of the door "reflect" the same scene in the summer, with greenery and a child seated on the balcony. The view is defined by many horizontals and verticals, creating a containment that is common in her paintings, which often feature windows and birdcages. She also painted many urban landscapes. Pflug said of her art, "I would like to reach a certain clarity which does not exist in life. But nature is complicated and changes all the time. One can only reach a small segment, and it takes such a long time."

=== Death ===
On April 4, 1972, Pflug committed suicide by taking an overdose of Seconal on the beach of Hanlan's Point on Toronto Island, which was one of her favourite outdoor painting places. A play based on her life—Christiane: Stations in a Painter's Life by Francophone writer Marguerite Andersen was produced in 1996 by the Factory Theatre Cafe in Toronto.

== Work and art ==
During her short lifetime Pflug established a successful career in Canada. She held a teaching position at the Ontario Art College (now OCAD) in Toronto, as one of four women to teach there during the 1960s as well as considerable attention from galleries, collectors and critics with a retrospective at the Winnipeg Art Gallery (1966), Justina M. Barnicke Gallery (Hart House) (1969) and the Alix Art Gallery, Sarnia (1971). Today her paintings are in the collections in National Gallery of Canada and the Art Gallery of Ontario. Pflug was praised for her rendering of Magic Realism in an article published by the Toronto Star (11 June 1969) that remarked, "[t]ime is... distorted in her paintings. They're worked on six hours a day for about nine months, and so seasons change—but the artist simply incorporates this change into her paintings. The foliage will be blooming and dying in different parts of the same painting; or the view outside will be winter, while the reflection on the glass door will be summer".

Pflug's life and career have resulted in the creation of several biographies, including Ann Davis's Somewhere Waiting: The life and Art of Christiane Pflug (1990) and Christine Conley's Daughter in Exile: The Painting Space of Christiane Pflug (1998). Her work was included in The Artist Herself: Self-Portraits by Canadian Historical Artists, an exhibition co-curated by Alicia Boutilier and Tobi Bruce, who also co-edited the catalogue.
