= Richard Gorman =

Canadian painter (1935–2010)

- Born: Richard Borthwick Gorman; December 20, 1935; Ottawa, Ontario, Canada
- Died: August 6, 2010 (aged 74); Ottawa, Ontario, Canada
- Education: Ontario College of Art, studied with Jock Macdonald (1954–1958)
- Known for: painter, sculptor, printmaker, filmmaker, also teacher at University of Ottawa (1972–1989), and Ottawa School of Art (1971–1989)
- Partner: Lynne Inez Carter
- Awards: Canada Council Grants
- Elected: Member in 1976, Royal Canadian Academy of Arts

Richard Borthwick Gorman RCA (December 20, 1935 – August 6, 2010) was a Canadian painter and printmaker. He was known for his magnetic prints which he created using ink covered ball-bearings manipulated with a magnet held behind the drawing board and for his large abstract paintings in which he broadly handled paint. In the 1960s, he also made aluminum sculptures and experimented with film.

== Biography ==
Gorman was born and grew up in Ottawa, a city where the National Gallery of Canada with its offering of Canadian art, particularly Tom Thomson, is an inescapable presence. Gorman's first art classes were at the gallery.

Gorman was recognized early as a painter of promise. Having moved to Toronto to attend the Ontario College of Art and Design, Gorman was written about by Jock Macdonald, his teacher, who said that he had the greatest promise among all the young artists he knew. As a member of the Isaacs Group of artists from 1959 on, composed of artists who showed their work at the Isaacs Gallery, he was a maverick whose main interest seems to have been a search for spiritual meaning. Although achieving major success as a painter, he became an early Isaacs drop-out. In 1964, he travelled to Ibiza, an island which is part of the Balearic group in Spain. In 1966, he left for London, England, only returning to Toronto in 1971.

At first, his abstraction only evoked landscape references, internalized, then he turned to painting nature full scale, especially the foliage and sky around Limerick Lake area near Bancroft, where his brother John had a cabin. He said that for him, the best thing about the city was the ruggedness of the nearby landscape.

A retrospective exhibition of Jock Macdonald in 1981 sent him again to study nature. In 1983, his memories of the work of Tom Thomson came together in a three-part Homage to Tom Thomson. He invented an alter-ego for himself: a painter named Jack Pine, who used to travel the northern rivers in a canoe painted all over in a yellow-and-black checkerboard pattern modeled on Canadian road sign painting. From 1984 to 1985, he created a 30-foot mural for Ottawa's Provincial Court House, titled Before the Law. Gorman said it was an image of nature near Ottawa before the explorers came. In 1986, a second 30-foot mural was commissioned for the Department of External Affairs at the Canadian embassy in Bridgetown, Barbados.

Gorman painted in watercolour as well as oil during these years, as well as making several thousand drawings of the figure because he considered figure drawing basic to his practice. In 1989, he returned to Toronto, opened a studio, and returned, mostly, to abstraction. In 1990, the Lake Galleries in Toronto in combination with the Robert McLaughlin Gallery in Oshawa held a retrospective titled Gorman Variations: Selected Paintings by Richard Gorman, 1960-90 of 30 years of his work. In 1998, Christopher Cutts Gallery in Toronto held his The Orpheus Series in which Gorman used an image of a single tree he found congenial. This time it appeared as a loosely painted central icon in a dazzlingly lavish display of colour.

From 1971 and 1972 to 1989, Gorman taught part-time at the Ottawa School of Art and University of Ottawa. He was elected a member of the Royal Canadian Academy in 1976.

== Selected public collections ==
- Agnes Etherington Art Centre, Kingston
- Art Gallery of Ontario, Toronto
- National Gallery of Canada, Ottawa
- The Robert McLaughlin Gallery, Oshawa
- Victoria and Albert Museum, London, England
- Shanghai Art Museum, China
