= Dorothy Cameron Bloore =

Canadian art dealer and artist (1924-2000)

- Born: Dorothy Cameron; 1924; Toronto, Ontario
- Died: January 2000 (aged 75–76); Toronto, Ontario, Canada
- Education: B.A., University of Toronto, Institute of Contemporary Art, Boston, under auspices of Harvard University
- Known for: art dealer, consultant, installation artist
- Spouse(s): Ron Bloore, married early 1970s

Dorothy Cameron Bloore (1924–2000) was a Canadian art dealer, and installation artist in Toronto, Ontario. Her work is in the Art Gallery of Hamilton, Ontario.

== Biography ==
Dorothy Cameron received her B.A. at the University of Toronto and studied afterwards at the Institute of Contemporary Art in Boson (under the auspices of Harvard University). She initially worked at assisting institutions such as the Bishop Strachan School and the Volunteer Committee of the Art Gallery of Ontario in Toronto. She became a panelist on the CTV version of To Tell the Truth.

She began her career as an art dealer and consultant in 1957 as an apprentice at the Gallery of Contemporary Art in Toronto and as the assistant director at the Jordan Gallery in 1958. In 1959, she opened the Here and Now Gallery showcasing contemporary Canadian work and in 1962, moved to a new and better location on Yonge street in Toronto as the Dorothy Cameron Gallery Ltd.

"She had flair, elegance, sophistication, and a passion for art".

In 1963, she decided to concentrate on sculpture in her gallery and, in 1964, organized Canadian Sculpture Today, a forward-looking show with a catalogue. Sculptors in the exhibition included, among others, Sorel Etrog, Anne Kahane, Robert Murray, Françoise Sullivan, Harold Town, and Walter Yarwood. In 1965, she organized a group show which included fibre sculptor Charlotte Lindgren.

In 1965, she was charged and convicted of exhibiting seven obscene drawings after a 1965 show on the theme of physical love, Eros '65 (she was the first art dealer to be so charged in Canada). Five of the banned works were by Robert Markle. The other two were by New Brunswick's Fred Ross and David Lawrence Chapman. The seven works were seized by the morality police as a result of a single complaint.

One of these pieces, Lovers I by Markle allegedly depicted lesbian activity, resulting in celebrity status for Markle due to media attention. Cameron appealed her conviction on charges of exposing "obscene pictures to public view" all the way to the Supreme Court of Canada, but lost and closed her gallery. Robert Fulford called her trial for obscenity "a comedy of mutual incomprehension."

After she closed the gallery in 1965, she acted as a consultant on sculpture shows such as Sculpture '67 in Toronto for which she selected the work of 54 sculptors, most of them modernist, such as Robert Murray. She also wrote for articles for Artscanada and Toronto Life.

In 1978, at the age of 55, after losing sight in her right eye, she began to make art propelled by the encouragement of Jungian analyst Fraser Boa. Her work had an affinity with Edward Kienholz and with Robert Rauschenberg's early combines. She had three solo shows and her work was shown in several group exhibitions. The Robert McLaughlin Gallery organized Dorothy Cameron: Private Eye, Selected Works 1979-1991.

As Joan Murray, the curator of the show wrote, these large idiosyncratic constructions in clay, papier-mâché and other materials (Cameron called them "assemblages") are an object lesson for artists who seek to pursue the theme of identity through the context of their work. These works are Cameron's own unusual "flamboyant" mixture, a combination of reflection and expression. They speak about different stages of life, and different ways of facing reality in an elaborate self-portrait. A Canadian Art Magazine editor posited that the show was "studded throughout with raw truths, told directly and with verve".

== Personal life ==
In the early 1970s, she married Ron Bloore. Dorothy Cameron Bloore died of pneumonia in Toronto, in January 2000.

== Bibliography ==
- Tippett, Maria (2017). "Sculpture in Canada". Douglas & McIntyre.
- Murray, Joan (2010). The Art of Florence Vale, 1909-2003. Brampton, Ont: Art Gallery of Peel. OCLC 663714305.
- Murray, Joan (1993). Dorothy Cameron: Private Eye. Oshawa: Robert McLaughlin Gallery.
- Jeremy Brown and Tom Hedley, “The Incredible Trial of Dorothy Cameron,” Toronto Telegram, Volume XXXIV:1, 27 Nov. 1965
