= Dennis Burton (artist) =

Canadian modernist painter

- Born: Dennis Eugene Norman Burton; December 6, 1933; Lethbridge, Alberta
- Died: July 8, 2013 (aged 79); Vancouver, British Columbia, Canada
- Education: Ontario College of Art, Toronto (1952– 1956) with Jock Macdonald; University of Southern California, Los Angeles, with Rico Lebrun, 1955; Skowhegan School of Painting and Sculpture, Maine, 1959 with Ben Shahn
- Known for: painter, sculptor, muralist, and educator
- Spouse(s): Heather White, Diane Pugen
- Partner: Sue Conner (since 1989)

Dennis Burton (December 6, 1933 – July 8, 2013) was a Canadian modernist painter.

== Biography ==
Burton was born and grew up in Lethbridge, Alberta, but won a scholarship to Pickering College in Newmarket, afterwards attending the Ontario College of Art (OCAD), studying with Jock Macdonald and Fred Hagan (1952-1956). He had further training at the University of Southern California, Los Angeles, with Rico Lebrun, 1955 and Skowhegan School of Painting and Sculpture, Maine, 1959 with Ben Shahn. Burton later worked as a graphic designer for the Canadian Broadcasting Company until 1960 when he began painting full-time.

An exhibition in 1955 of Painters Eleven at Toronto's Hart House (today the Justina M. Barnicke Gallery, Art Museum at the University of Toronto) which he visited with his friend, artist Gordon Rayner, turned him towards abstraction. But it was their subsequent visit to the Albright Knox Museum in Buffalo NY (now called the Buffalo AKG Art Museum), where they first saw the American abstractionists: Willem de Kooning, Franz Kline, Clyfford Still and others, that really turned them around, and on returning to Toronto both Burton and Rayner painted their first abstract paintings. Under the influence of the neo-Dada movement current in Toronto in the late 1950s and first half of the 1960s, Burton began to create sculpture using scrap metal and found materials welded together.

He showed his work with Toronto's Isaacs Gallery (1961, 1962, 1965). For this reason, he has been called part of the Isaacs Group of artists, which include, among others, Michael Snow, Joyce Wieland, John Meredith and Graham Coughtry.

Burton had a number of public commissions, among them a mural for the Edmonton Airport in 1963. He is best known for the Garterbeltmania works of females in their underwear which he showed with the Robert McLaughlin Gallery in Oshawa in his retrospective in 1977. With artists such as Joyce Wieland, he explored the erotic theme in Canadian art. These works made politician John Diefenbaker denounce Dennis Burton in the House of Commons, coining the term "garter belt-maniac". But both before and after these works, he created large abstractions that might involve using different creative strategies involving language, colour and form.

Besides painting, Burton was an educator. He was the co-founder of Toronto`s New School of Art (1965) and Director (1971–1977). He was chairman of painting department at OCAD (1970) and taught at the Banff School of Fine Arts (1974), University of Lethbridge (1976, 1989); and was co-founder of ART`S SAKE, Toronto (1977); and taught at Emily Carr University, Vancouver (1980–1991). His papers are in the Dennis Burton fonds, Edward P. Taylor Library & Archives, Art Gallery of Ontario, Toronto, CA ON00012 SC100.

On July 8, 2013, Dennis Burton died at age 79.

== Selected public collections ==
- Art Gallery of Ontario, Toronto
- The Canada Council Art Bank Collection
- The Hirshhorn Museum, Washington
- Glenbow Museum, Calgary
- Los Angeles County Museum
- Metropolitan Museum, New York
- Montreal Museum of Fine Arts
- National Gallery of Canada, Ottawa
- Robert McLaughlin Gallery, Oshawa
- Smithsonian Institution, Washington
- Southern Alberta Art Gallery, Lethbridge
- Vancouver Art Gallery
- Walker Art Center, Minneapolis
