= Gordon Rayner =

Canadian abstract painter (1935-2010)

- Born: June 14, 1935; Toronto, Ontario, Canada
- Died: September 26, 2010 (aged 75); Toronto, Ontario, Canada
- Education: self-taught
- Known for: painter, sculptor, film-maker, print-maker, also teacher at Toronto's New School of Art (1965)
- Spouse: Kate Regan
- Awards: Canada Council Grants and Senior Fellowships (1961-1973); Toronto Outdoor Competition (1960), First prize for prints, 12th Winnipeg show (1970)

Gordon Rayner (June 14, 1935 – September 26, 2010) was a Canadian abstract expressionist painter. His way of creating art was idiosyncratic and characterized by constant innovation and often by transformation of his medium. Later, he integrated realism into his practice.

== Biography ==
As a young person, Gordon Rayner learned to paint from his father, a commercial artist and weekend painter, and from his father's close friend, Jack Bush. He spent 17 years working in commercial art, starting with Bush's commercial art firm, Wookey, Bush and Winter. An exhibition of Painters Eleven in 1955, and especially the work of William Ronald, which he visited with his friend, artist Dennis Burton, at Toronto's Hart House Gallery (today the Justina M. Barnicke Gallery, Art Museum at the University of Toronto) turned him towards abstraction as did visits to the Albright Knox Art Gallery in Buffalo (now called the Buffalo AKG Art Museum), to see artists such as Willem de Kooning.

Under the influence of the neo-Dada movement current in Toronto in the late 1950s and first half of the 1960s, Rayner began to combine found materials with his paintings.

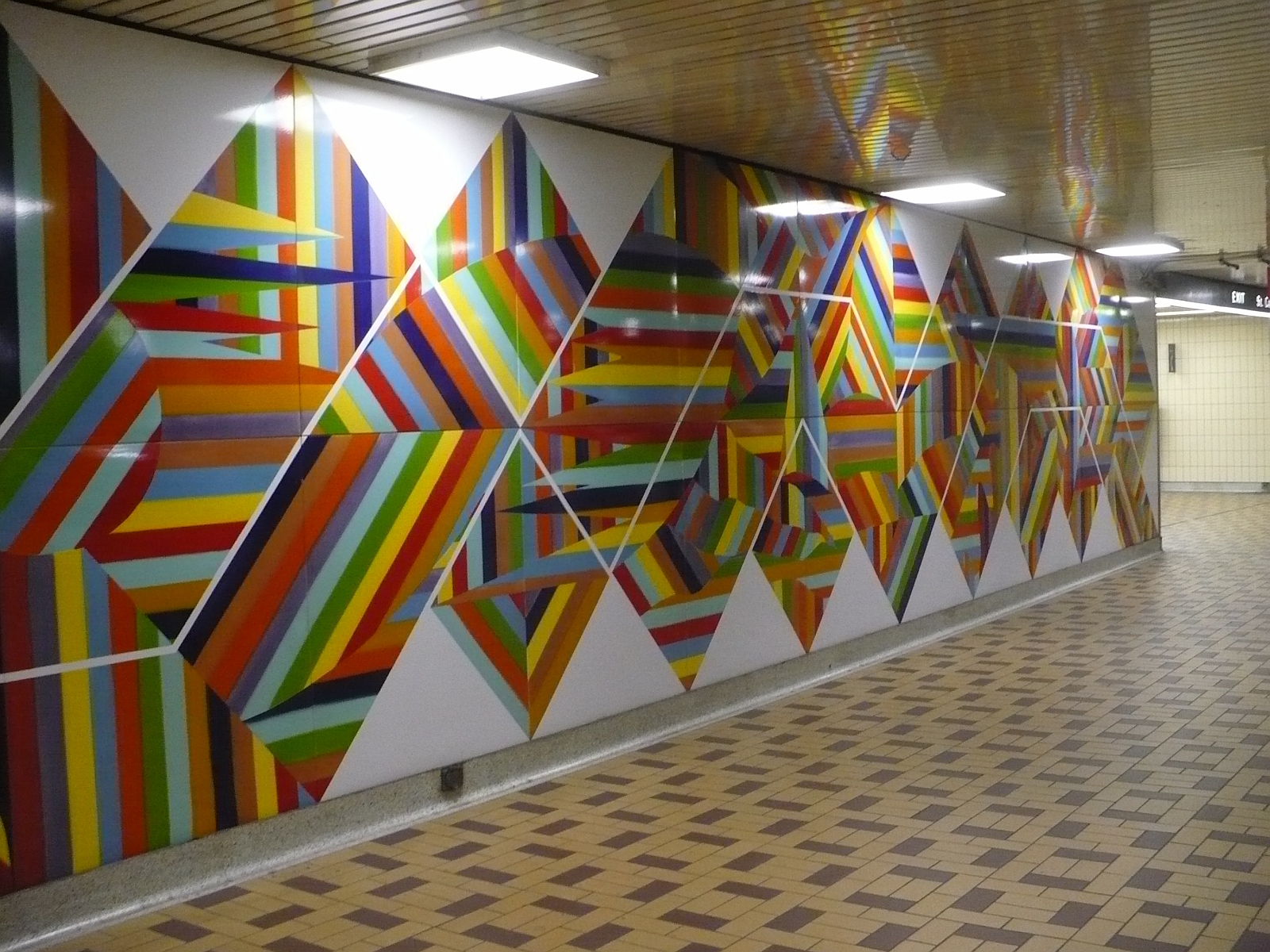
Tempo, a mural by Rayner at Toronto's St. Clair West station

In 1966, he began a new period in his work centred around images of Magnetawan, an area 200 miles north of Toronto, north of the Muskoka District. It provided him with a favourite painting place in which he could experiment with materials and technique while demonstrating how to refer to nature without copying it in his work. To express his feelings, he used oblique references, a thick and expressionist technique, and sometimes found objects. These paintings were intuitive reinterpretations of landscapes dramatically conceived.

Rayner showed his work with Toronto's Isaacs Gallery. For this reason, he has been called part of the Isaacs Group of artists, which include, among others, Michael Snow, Joyce Wieland, John Meredith and Graham Coughtry.

In the 1980s, his work shifted direction to a new interest in the figure. He began to reinvent this crucial subject of art for himself using dimensions of the inner, more spiritual self and obliquely explored realism in the context of the body, painting himself in inventive scenes. Some of these paintings are called the Oaxaca Suite, since Rayner lived in Oaxaca in southern Mexico in 1993 and 1994.

On September 26, 2010, Gordon Rayner died suddenly at home in Toronto.

== Collections ==
- Agnes Etherington Art Centre, Kingston
- Art Gallery of Ontario, Toronto
- Art Gallery of Windsor
- Art Institute of Chicago
- The Canada Council Art Bank Collection
- The Hirshhorn Museum, Washington
- MacKenzie Art Gallery, Regina
- Montreal Museum of Fine Arts
- Museum of Modern Art, New York
- National Gallery of Canada, Ottawa
- Philadelphia Museum of Art
- The Robert McLaughlin Gallery, Oshawa
- Vancouver Art Gallery

== Commissions ==
Rayner had numerous public commissions, among them mural Tempo (porcelain enamel on steel) for the Toronto Transit Commission, Spadina Subway line, St. Clair Station (1977).
