= John Meredith (artist) =

Canadian abstract painter (1933-2000)

- Born: John Meredith Smith; July 24, 1933; Fergus, Ontario
- Died: May 9, 2000 (aged 66); Toronto, Ontario, Canada
- Education: Ontario College of Art, Toronto (1950-1953)
- Known for: Painter
- Spouse(s): Ursula Keeler (married 1968, after divorce and remarriage, Ursula Pecinska), (second wife, Kiyoko Meredith)

John Meredith Smith RCA (July 24, 1933 – May 9, 2000), known professionally as John Meredith, was a Canadian abstract expressionist painter. His trademark as a painter was rich, exciting colour which he combined with loosely figurative images of vertical stripes and forms or idiosyncratic calligraphy. He often used a small coloured ink drawing divided into squares as a template from which to develop his large canvases. In 1966, he began using details from still-wet drawings he had smudged – a way of working he regarded as his invention.

== Biography ==
Meredith was born in Fergus, Ontario, but while still a young child, his family moved to Brampton, Ontario. Like his older brother (artist William Ronald), he attended the Ontario College of Art (1950–1953), studying with Jock Macdonald, and became interested in abstract art. After he graduated, he worked for the local newspaper, (the Brampton Conservator), as a cartoonist. In 1958, while still making his home in Brampton, he held the first solo show of his work at Toronto's Gallery of Contemporary Art. His work at this time includes sombre canvases of the late 1950s and 1960 with dark colours, sometimes interspersed with red and purple, as well as loosely figurative images of vertical stripes and forms.

Meredith held his second solo show in 1961 at Toronto's Isaacs Gallery. The exhibition was favorably reviewed in the Toronto Star and he joined the Isaacs Gallery in 1962. In 1963, he moved to Toronto and continued to paint and hold solo shows. In 1963, he showed at the Isaacs Gallery and in 1965, at the Blue Barn Gallery and then at the Isaacs Gallery again (1967, 1969). In these years, he developed brightly coloured dynamic canvases. Seeker, a triptych, in the collection of the Art Gallery of Ontario, is possibly his most major work. He developed from a study of coloured inks on paper which is also in the gallery collection. Meredith painted it with his parents in mind, thinking of them as spiritual beings, and it took him four months to paint.

There were more changes to come. Over a period of years, Meredith recalled the calligraphy of Oriental art, his symbolic imagery changed into abstract imagery, and he used colour to explore space, enriching his palette to include pinks, purples and greens, then staining his canvas in the manner of other artists of the period.

In these years too, he was given major recognition for his work and included in many group shows, both in Canada and abroad. Moreover, in 1986, in his home town of Brampton, the Peel Art Gallery, Museum and Archives held a 30-year survey of his work. By the end of the 1990s, the work of Meredith, often painted with Expressionist brio, offered the public a more dramatic vision of the artist, but in reinstating colour and using the palette knife in his work, Meredith reflected more overtly than ever before the rich allocations of pigment to canvas so characteristic of Ronald and especially apparent in Ronald's late works with their thick layers of dripped and splashed paint. But Ronald was ill (he died in 1998) and Meredith may have felt that a tribute was in order.

Meredith died of pneumonia on September 9, 2000, in Toronto.

== Selected public collections ==
- Agnes Etherington Art Centre, Kingston
- Art Gallery of Ontario, Toronto
- Art Windsor-Essex
- The Canada Council Collection
- MacKenzie Art Gallery, Regina
- Montreal Museum of Fine Arts
- National Gallery of Canada, Ottawa
- The Robert McLaughlin Gallery, Oshawa
- Vancouver Art Gallery
- Museum London, London, Ontario

== Awards ==
- 1971 Victor Martyn Lynch-Staunton Award from the Canada Council.
