= David Mirvish =

Canadian art collector, businessman (b. 1944)

David Mirvish CM OOnt
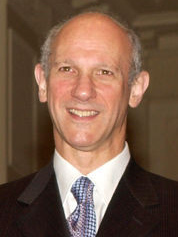
- Mirvish in 2004
- Born: August 29, 1944 (age 82); Toronto, Ontario
- Occupations: Theatrical producer, Business owner, Art collector
- Spouse: Audrey Mirvish (m. 1967)
- Children: 3
- Parent(s): Ed Mirvish, Anne Macklin

8th Chancellor of the University of Guelph
- In office February 13, 2012 – c. 2017
- Preceded by: Pamela Wallin
- Succeeded by: Martha Billes

David Mirvish, CM OOnt (born August 29, 1944) is a Canadian theatre producer, impresario, and art collector. He owns and operates Toronto-based theatrical production company Mirvish Productions, which he founded with his father in 1986. He has also produced and presented several productions on Broadway and in London's West End.

Mirvish is also a prominent art collector, having amassed a large collection of Canadian and international works, including from renowned artists Frank Stella and Jules Olitski. Between 1963 and 1978, he owned and ran a commercial art gallery, David Mirvish Gallery. He also owned an independent bookstore specializing in art and design between 1974 and 2009.

== Personal life ==
Mirvish is the only child of Anne Lazar Macklin, an artist, and "Honest" Ed Mirvish, who was a Toronto businessman and owner of the discount department store, Honest Ed's. He is Jewish.

Mirvish married his high-school sweetheart Audrey in 1967. They have three children, Jacob, Hannah, and Rachael.

He has contributed to, and partnered with, many non-profit organizations, charities and other philanthropic organizations, including the Toronto Public Library, the Toronto Arts Foundation, and Kids Up Front. In 2023, he worked with The Thirty Birds Foundation to provide Kabul school girls who had fled Afghanistan with access to tickets to shows, including the Canadian production of Harry Potter and the Cursed Child.

== Theatre career ==
=== Mirvish Productions ===
In 1986, Mirvish co-founded Mirvish Productions with his father, with the purpose of producing and presenting large-scale original works at the Royal Alexandra Theatre, and, in 1993, the newly built Princess of Wales Theatre. Following his father's retirement, Mirvish took over control of the Royal Alexandra Theatre, which was initially purchased as a temporary venue for touring productions.

Mirvish experienced early success with Canadian productions, such as Les Misérables (1989-1990), Miss Saigon (1993-1995), Crazy for You (1993-1995), and Beauty and the Beast (1995-1997). After productions of Tommy (1995) and Jane Eyre (1996-1997) were less successful, Mirvish once again found continued success with other large-scale musicals. In 1999, Mirvish announced they would be launching a Canadian sit-down production of The Lion King, which premiered at the Princess of Wales Theatre in March 2000. Also that same year, Mamma Mia! made its North American premiere at the Royal Alexandra Theatre. After its success, Mirvish opened a Canadian sit-down production of the musical which ran for five years. After declining theatre attendance because of the SARS outbreak, The Lion King closed in January 2004 and Mamma Mia closed in May 2005.

In 2005, he partnered with Kevin Wallace, Saul Zaentz, and Michael Cohl to produce The Lord of the Rings, a stage musical adaptation based on J. R. R. Tolkien's novels of the same name. The world premiere production opened in March 2005, and cost an estimated $30 million. The musical closed on September 3, 2006, following poor sales and negative reviews. The musical, which was advertised as the most expensive stage production in North American history, was unable to fully repay its investors.

In 2008, Mirvish finalized a deal to acquire both the Canon Theatre and the Panasonic Theatre. The sale was challenged by Aubrey Dan, but Mirvish ultimately prevailed, giving him two Yonge Street theatres. The Canon Theatre was later renamed the Ed Mirvish Theatre in honour of his father.

In 2018, Mirvish mounted a sit-down production of the Canadian musical Come from Away at the Royal Alexandra Theatre. As a result of the production's success, the production was relocated to the Elgin Theatre in 2019 to accommodate the new Canadian sit-down production of Dear Evan Hansen, which was promised the Royal Alexandra Theatre. Come from Away later returned to the Royal Alexandra Theatre, and, after a hiatus because of the COVID-19 pandemic, returned in December 2021. However, the musical permanently closed after only a few performances amidst tightened pandemic restrictions that were re-introduced. Come from Away played 855 performances in Toronto, making it the longest-running Canadian show and musical.

In May 2022, a Canadian production of Harry Potter and the Cursed Child premiered at the Ed Mirvish Theatre. The theatre underwent an extensive $5 million renovation and set a Canadian weekly box office record for a non-musical play, grossing an estimated $2 million in sales. By the time the play closed, Harry Potter and the Cursed Child set a record for the longest running professional play in Canadian history.

In November 2023, Mirvish announced that The Lion King would return to Toronto for an open-ended run at the Princess of Wales Theatre. According to Mirvish, this would be the first time in North America that a city will host a second sit-down production of the musical, with the original Canadian production having run from 2000 to 2004.

=== The Old Vic ===
In 1982, Mirvish and his father purchased The Old Vic, a performing arts theatre when it was placed for sale. Mirvish's winning bid was approximately, £550,000, outbidding Andrew Lloyd Webber. They immediately began renovating and refurbishing the theater. The theatre reopened on October 31, 1983 with The Queen Mother in attendance.

In 1987, Mirvish installed Jonathan Miller as artistic director. They experienced a string of critical and commercial success, including winning an Olivier Award for a production of the musical Candide. However, after three consecutive years of mounting financial losses, Miller resigned in 1990. Sir Peter Hall was also appointed artistic director of The Old Vic. Under Hall's direction, the company experienced success with productions of The Master Builder and Waiting for Godot. Despite the successes, the financial losses continued. By 1998, Mirvish sold The Old Vic to a charitable trust, which has continued operating the theatre as a non-profit.

== Art collections ==
Mirvish began his career as an art collector in 1963, when he was 19 years old. That same year, he opened his first business, David Mirvish Gallery, to display contemporary Canadian, American and British art. In 1974, he opened David Mirvish Books, an independent bookstore dedicated to books on art and design. The bookstore closed in 2009.

Since the closure of the art gallery in 1978, Mirvish continues to buy and sell Canadian and international artwork as a private collector. In addition, he lends works to museums and occasionally puts them on display in his theatres.

=== David Mirvish Gallery ===
In 1963, at the age of 19, Mirvish opened an art gallery that specialized in American abstract painters of the 1960s and 1970s known as the Color Field school. The David Mirvish Gallery was one of the first businesses to open in the new Markham Street community, which later became known as Mirvish Village.

The gallery primarily showcased Color Field and Post-painterly Abstraction works. Over the next 15 years, through approximately 130 exhibitions, the gallery became a focal point of Toronto's cultural life and was considered a pillar in the establishment of the abstract art movement in Canada. By the mid-1970s, Mirvish found that much of the artwork that interested him and that he wanted to display had decreased in popularity. Despite this, the gallery continued to provide both inventory and expertise to a number of commercial art dealers worldwide and to lend works to scholarly exhibitions even after closing public exhibitions in the summer of 1978.

=== David Mirvish Books ===
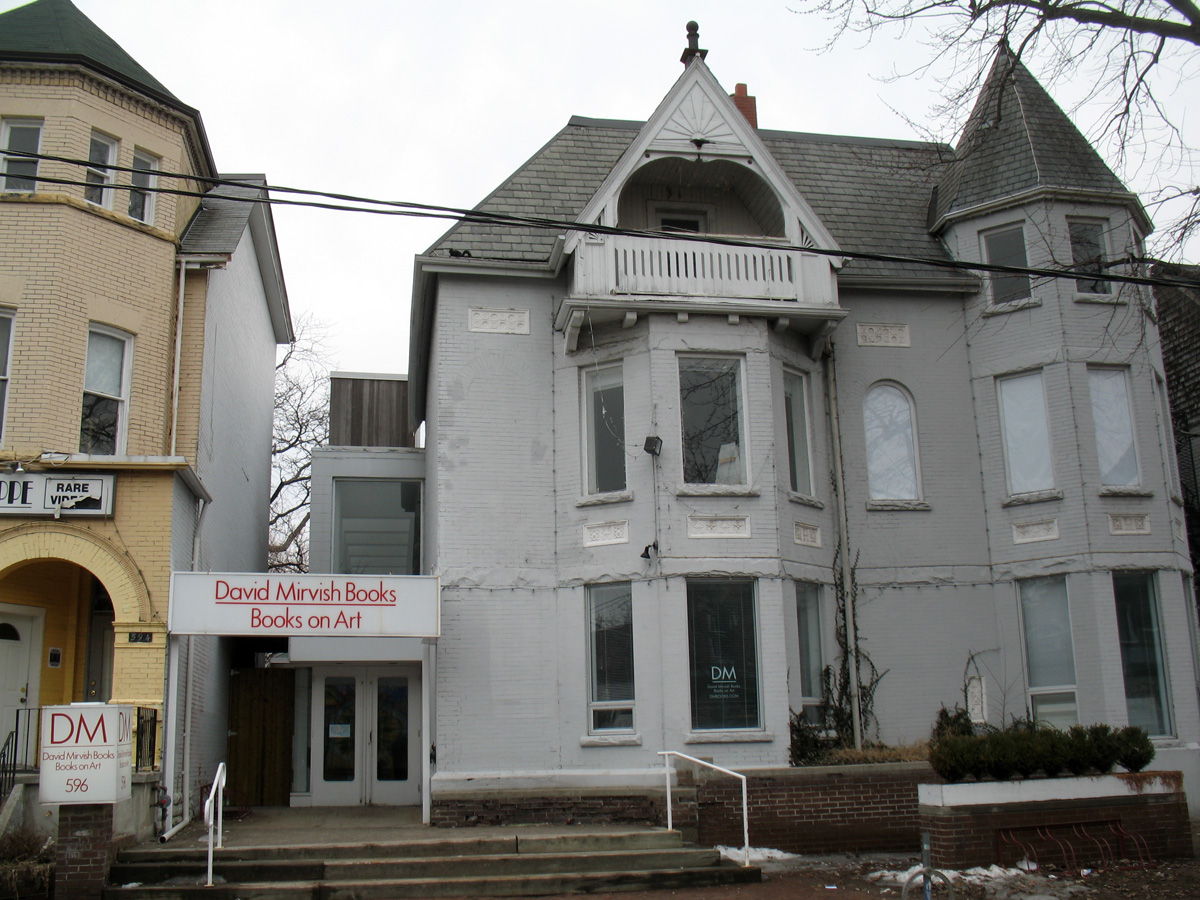
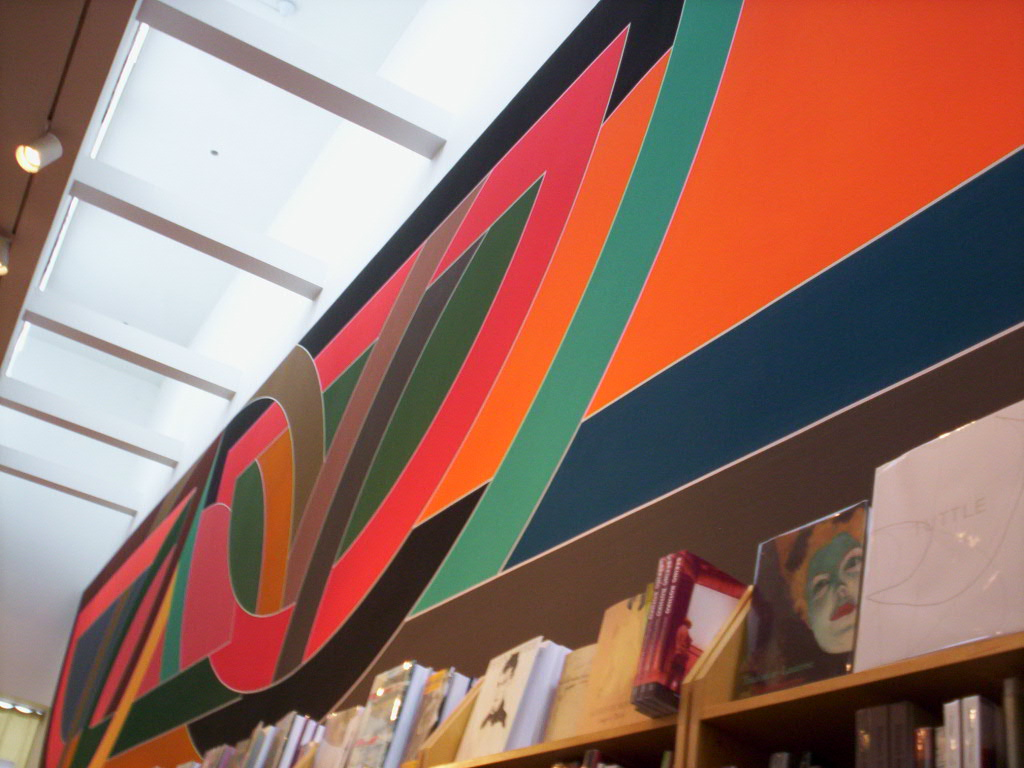
David Mirvish Books in 2009 (left), and the Frank Stella painting on display (right)

In 1974, Mirvish opened an independent bookstore, David Mirvish Books, which specialized in books on visual arts, architecture, photography, design and film. The bookstore was originally located directly across the street from his art gallery, and located near Honest Ed's. However, upon closure of his art gallery in 1978, the bookstore relocated into its premises. It featured a 50-foot wall painting by Frank Stella, Damascus Gate, Stretch Variation. The bookstore developed a cult following, and was popular among arts students and researchers since it offered many out-of-print books on art and design.

The store closed in 2009, citing the changing retail market for small independent bookstores and uncertain economic market at the time.

== Real estate ventures ==
In 1999, Mirvish worked with Toronto real-estate developer Harry Stinson to purchase the building at 1 King Street West in downtown Toronto, and transform it into a mixed-use development featuring luxury condominiums, hotel suites, and commercial office space. The property became known as One King West. The redevelopment and renovation project began in 2000, and cost an estimated $95 million. The luxury condos opened in 2006, however, later that year, Mirvish dissolved the partnership with Stinson. Mirvish accused Stinson of owing him $11.8 million that was overdue. In response to Mirvish's demand for payment, Stinson filed for bankruptcy protection. This dispute led to Mirvish retaining some of the more valuable parts of the property, which included three penthouses and ownership of unsold units. Mirvish eventually ended up selling off these assets.

In August 2010, Mirvish announced that he would provide a 9,765 square foot space to Theatre Museum Canada. This provided the mostly online museum with its first permanent space for exhibition.

In September 2012, Mirvish unveiled plans to demolish the Princess of Wales Theatre, where it would be replaced as part of a development project designed by renowned architect Frank Gehry. The plan included the construction of three condominium towers, referred to as "sculptures", and a large public gallery called the Mirvish Collection, which would showcase Mirvish's extensive art collection. Additionally, the project aimed to create a new campus for OCAD University, which would integrate cultural and educational elements into the residential complex. Although admitting he was hesitant to destroy the theatre, Mirvish still believed that this project would combine residential spaces with significant cultural amenities, and improve Toronto's reputation as a global cultural destination.

This plan faced significant criticism and was ultimately rejected by Toronto Council due to concerns about over-densification, the towers' height, and the area's historical value as a cultural hub. In response to these objections, Mirvish substantially revised his plans. In May 2014, he unveiled a new proposal that retained the Princess of Wales Theatre while still pursuing a major development project. The revised plan reduced the number of towers from three to two, with heights of 92 and 82 storeys, respectively. This modification decreased the overall density by 25-30% and reduced the number of residential units by 600. The new design also incorporated a public square between the towers at street level and maintained space for art exhibitions. This compromise addressed many of the city's concerns while still allowing for significant development. This received support from the city's planning department, with Chief Planner Jennifer Keesmaat stating they were "substantively towards agreement".

== Other ventures ==
Between 2002 and 2005, Mirvish was a member of the Board of Trustees of the Royal Ontario Museum and the National Gallery of Canada.

In February 2012, Mirvish was appointed the 8th Chancellor of the University of Guelph and was installed as Chancellor at the June 2012 convocation ceremonies. Mirvish's appointment as Chancellor was extended in 2014. However, in September 2016, Mirvish resigned as Chancellor citing increased personal and work responsibilities.

== Theatre credits ==
=== Toronto ===
Mirvish presents several shows specifically for Toronto that play for either a limited engagement or an extended run, of which Mirvish was a producer or co-producer on:

- Les Misérables (1989)
- Dry Lips Oughta Move to Kapuskasing (1991)
- Miss Saigon (1993)
- Crazy for You (1993)
- Beauty and the Beast (1995)
- Jane Eyre (1996)
- Rent (1997)
- Two Pianos Four Hands (1998)
- The Lion King (2000)
- Mamma Mia! (2000)
- The Drowsy Chaperone (2001)
- The Producers (2003)
- Hairspray (2004)
- Lord of the Rings (2006)
- We Will Rock You (2007)
- Dirty Dancing (2007)
- The Sound of Music (2008)
- The Harder They Come (2009)
- The Boys in the Photograph (2009)
- My Mother's Lesbian Jewish Wiccan Wedding (2009)
- Fiddler on the Roof (2009)
- Rent (2010)
- Cloud 9 (2010)
- A Jew Grows in Brooklyn (2010)
- Rock of Ages (2010)
- How Now Mrs Brown Cow (2010)
- Priscilla, Queen of the Desert (2010)
- A Funny Thing Happened on the Way to the Forum (2010)
- Billy Elliot the Musical (2011)
- Calendar Girls (2011)
- Ghost Stories (2011)
- The Railway Children (2011)
- Chess (2011)
- Private Lives (2011)
- War Horse (2012)
- Terminus (2012)
- The Wizard of Oz (2012)
- Without You (2012)
- Clybourne Park (2013)
- Mary Walsh's Dancing with Rage (2013)
- Cats (2013)
- Les Misérables (2013)
- God of Carnage (2013)
- The Last Confession (2014)
- Dead Metaphor (2014)
- The Heart of Robin Hood (2014)
- Blades on Stage (2014)
- Blithe Spirit (2015)
- Once (2015)
- Vanya and Sonia and Masha and Spike (2015)
- Kinky Boots (2015)
- Seminar (2015)
- The Judas Kiss (2016)
- Disgraced (2016)
- Matilda (2016)
- Cuisine & Confessions (2016)
- Come from Away (2016)
- The Audience (2017)
- The Bodyguard (2017)
- My Night With Reg (2017)
- Mrs Henderson Presents (2017)
- Strictly Ballroom (2017)
- Beautiful: The Carole King Musical (2017)
- North by Northwest (2017)
- The Curious Incident of the Dog in the Night-Time (2017)
- Salt-Water Moon (2017)
- Come from Away (2018)
- Fun Home (2018)
- Ain't Too Proud (2018)
- Oslo (2019)
- Dear Evan Hansen (2019)
- Next to Normal (2019)
- Girl from the North Country (2019)
- Piaf/Dietrich (2019)
- Room (2022)
- Harry Potter and the Cursed Child (2022)
- Two Pianos Four Hands (2022)
- Indecent (2022)
- Fisherman's Friends (2022)
- Joseph and the Amazing Technicolor Dreamcoat (2022)
- Things I Know to Be True (2023)
- In Dreams (2023)
- SIX (2023)
- Uncle Vanya (2024)
- Rosencrantz and Guildenstern Are Dead (2024)
- Come from Away (2024)
- The Lion King (2024)
- Titanique (2024)
- Just for One Day (2025)
- Life After (2025)
- Tell Tale Harbour (2025)
- Bright Star (2025)
- & Juliet (2025)
- Kimberly Akimbo (2026)

=== Broadway / West End ===
- The Mikado (1987 - Broadway)
- H.M.S. Pinafore (1987 - North American tour)
- Into the Woods (1990 - West End)
- Spoils of War (1988 - Broadway)
- Buddy: The Buddy Holly Story (1990 - Broadway)
- Buddy: The Buddy Holly Story (1991 - North American tour)
- Mamma Mia! (2000 - North American tour)
- Stones in His Pockets (2001 - Broadway)
- Stones in His Pockets (2002 - North American tour)
- Legends! (2006 - North American tour)
- Macbeth (2008 - Broadway)
- Guys and Dolls (2009 - Broadway)
- Looped (2010 - Broadway)
- Elling (2010 - Broadway)
- Priscilla, Queen of the Desert (2011 - Broadway)
- High (2011 - Broadway)
- Private Lives (2011 - Broadway)
- Seminar (2011 - Broadway)
- Dead Accounts (2012 - Broadway)
- Lucky Guy (2013 - Broadway)
- The Wizard of Oz (2013 - North American tour)
- Violet (2014 - Broadway)
- The Audience (2015 - Broadway)
- Skylight (2015 - Broadway)
- An Act of God (2015 - Broadway)
- Dear Evan Hansen (2016 - Broadway)
- Come from Away (2017 - Broadway)
- Amélie (2017 - Broadway)
- Anastasia (2017 - Broadway)
- The Band's Visit (2017 - Broadway)
- Heisenberg: The Uncertainty Principle (2017 - West End)
- Angels in America (2018 - Broadway)
- Three Tall Women (2018 - Broadway)
- The Iceman Cometh (2018 - Broadway)
- The Waverly Gallery (2018 - Broadway)
- Dear Evan Hansen (2018 - North American tour)
- Come from Away (2018 - North American tour)
- Anastasia (2018 - North American tour)
- Company (2018 - West End)
- Torch Song (2018 - Broadway)
- Network (2018 - Broadway)
- To Kill a Mockingbird (2018 - Broadway)
- Come from Away (2019 - West End)
- Ain't Too Proud (2019 - Broadway)
- Oklahoma! (2019 - Broadway)
- The Band's Visit (2019 - North American tour)
- Derren Brown: Secret (2019 - Broadway)
- Tina (2019 - Broadway)
- Jagged Little Pill (2019 - Broadway)
- Girl from the North Country (2019 - West End)
- Girl from the North Country (2020 - Broadway)
- Joseph and the Amazing Technicolor Dreamcoat (2021 - West End)
- Oklahoma! (2021 - North American tour)
- Ain't Too Proud (2021 - North American tour)
- Girl from the North Country (2022 - UK tour)
- Joseph and the Amazing Technicolor Dreamcoat (2022 - UK tour)
- To Kill a Mockingbird (2022 - North American tour)
- Hangmen (2022 - Broadway)
- Fisherman's Friends (2022 - UK tour)
- Tina (2022 - North American tour)
- Death of a Salesman (2022 - Broadway)
- Bleak Expectations (2023 - West End)
- The Wizard of Oz (2023 - West End)
- In Dreams (2023 - Leeds Playhouse, England)
- Sunset Boulevard (2023 - West End)
- The Wizard of Oz (2023 - UK tour)
- Just for One Day (2024 - The Old Vic, England)
- Come from Away (2024 - UK tour)
- Player Kings (2024 - West End)
- Starlight Express (2024 - London)
- Swept Away (2024 - Broadway)

== Honours and awards ==
=== Distinguished awards ===
- 1995: Received an Honorary Fellowship from the Royal Conservatory of Music.
- 1996: Invested as a Member of the Order of Canada.
- 1996: Received an Honorary Doctor of Letters from Ryerson University
- 1998: Awarded the Laurence Olivier Award for Society of London Theatre Special Award for his achievements in British theatre (also awarded to his father, Ed Mirvish)
- 1998: Received an Honorary Doctor of Laws from Queen's University
- 2001: Awarded the Order of Ontario.
- 2002: Received an Honorary Doctor of Letters from York University
- 2004: Received an Honorary Doctor of Laws from the University of Toronto, for his service to the community and the university.
- 2012: Received an Honorary Bachelor of Applied Studies from Sheridan College.

=== Tony Awards ===
As a producer, Mirvish has been nominated for 19 Tony Awards, winning 5 times.

Year	Nominated work	Category	Result
2008	Macbeth	Best Revival of a Play	Nominated
2009	Guys and Dolls	Best Revival of a Musical	Nominated
2013	Lucky Guy	Best Play	Nominated
2014	Violet	Best Revival of a Musical	Nominated
2015	Skylight	Best Revival of a Play	Won
2017	Dear Evan Hansen	Best Musical	Won
2017	Come from Away	Best Musical	Nominated
2018	The Band's Visit	Best Musical	Won
2018	Angels in America	Best Revival of a Play	Won
2018	Three Tall Women	Best Revival of a Play	Nominated
2018	The Iceman Cometh	Best Revival of a Play	Nominated
2019	Ain't Too Proud	Best Musical	Nominated
2019	Oklahoma!	Best Revival of a Musical	Won
2019	Torch Song	Best Revival of a Play	Nominated
2019	The Waverly Gallery	Best Revival of a Play	Nominated
2020	Jagged Little Pill	Best Musical	Nominated
2020	Tina: The Tina Turner Musical	Best Musical	Nominated
2022	Girl from the North Country	Best Musical	Nominated
2022	Hangmen	Best Play	Nominated

== See also ==
- Mirvish Productions
- David Mirvish Gallery
- Mirvish+Gehry
