= Robert Markle =

Canadian artist (1936–1990)

- Born: Robert Nelson Markle; August 25, 1936; Hamilton, Ontario
- Died: July 5, 1990 (aged 53); Mount Forest, Ontario
- Education: Ontario College of Art
- Known for: Painting
- Spouse: Marlene Shuster (m. 1958)

Robert Markle (August 25, 1936 – July 5, 1990) was a Canadian painter of the female nude.

== Early life and career ==
Markle was born in Hamilton, Ontario, in 1936. In 1954, he began attending the Ontario College of Art in Toronto, where he met his wife, Marlene Shuster.

Since his wife worked at the Isaacs Gallery in Toronto, his work came to the attention of Avrom Isaacs, and he held his first solo exhibition at the Gallery in 1963. He is considered one of the "Isaacs Group" of artists. In 1965, he participated in a group show called Eros '65 at the Dorothy Cameron Gallery in Toronto. A police raid on the show led to an obscenity trial which Cameron lost. She had to close the gallery but the media attention brought Markle celebrity status.

In 1968, a retrospective of his work was held at the McIntosh Memorial Art Gallery at the University of Western Ontario. In 1989, the Thunder Bay Art Gallery curated The Painter and his Model: Markle since '85. The Durham Art Gallery organized Markle retrospectives in 1990 and 2002. In 2003, Anna Hudson for the Art Gallery of Ontario, Toronto, organized an exhibition entitled Woman as Goddess: Liberated Nudes by Robert Markle and Joyce Wieland, in which Markle's work was sharply criticized, and Markle called a misogynist by the Toronto Globe and Mail. In 2011, Blazing Figures: A Retrospective of Robert Markle opened at the Gallery de Boer in Owen Sound.

Markle's work has been collected by public institutions such as the National Gallery of Art, the Art Gallery of Ontario, and the Philadelphia Museum of Art. The Robert Markle fonds (SC076) in the Edward P. Taylor Library & Archives, Art Gallery of Ontario, documents his life and work. There is also a J.A. Wainwright – Robert Markle collection in this repository.

Markle taught at The New School of Art (founded in 1965) from around 1966 to 1976. In 1977, he was a founding member of Art's Sake Inc., an artist-run post-secondary art school in Toronto, where he also taught. In addition, Markle taught at the University of Guelph.

== Commissions ==
In 1980, he won a commission to decorate a hamburger restaurant in the city, named Markleangelo's in his honour. Markle used acrylic, neon tubing, electrical wiring, mirrored panels, and Plexiglas on wood for the panels in the restaurant which had depictions of angels. When the restaurant closed, Markle's works there were given to the Robert McLaughlin Gallery in Oshawa. (The Art Gallery of Ontario in its "Close-Looking" series discusses one of the angels.) Markle also did wall-sculptures for the Ellen Fairclough Building in Hamilton (1981) and the Metro Toronto Convention Centre (c. 1984), and painted outdoor murals in Mount Forest (1986) and Owen Sound, Ontario (1987).

Markle based the mural in the Metro Centre on Mohawk symbols.

== Personal life and death ==
An accident while riding his motor bike in 1969 left him with two broken arms and internal injuries. After recovering from his accident, he moved with his wife to a farm at Holstein, Ontario, near Mount Forest. About then, he began to examine his Mohawk heritage, followed by a trip to the Caughnawaga reserve.

In 1990, Markle's truck hit a tractor in Mount Forest, Ontario, near the farm that he and his wife shared. He died of his injuries, at the age of 53.
