= Avrom Isaacs =

Canadian art dealer (1926-2016)

- Born: March 19, 1926; Winnipeg, Manitoba, Canada
- Died: January 15, 2016 (aged 89); Toronto, Ontario, Canada
- Known for: Art dealer
- Spouse(s): Norma Renault (m. 1956-1987); Donnalu Wigmore (m. 2012-2016)
- Awards: Order of Canada

Avrom Isaacs, CM D.F.A. (March 19, 1926 – January 15, 2016) was a Canadian art dealer and tastemaker.

== Career ==
Avrom Isaacovitch, known as Av Isaacs, was born in Winnipeg, Manitoba, and moved to Toronto with his family in 1941. Isaacs graduated with a bachelor's degree in Political Science and Economics from the University of Toronto in 1950.

He began his career in the arts in 1950 when he opened the Greenwich Art Shop, a small framing store on Hayter Street in Toronto. In 1955, when he shared a room with artist Graham Coughtry, Coughtry, along with Michael Snow, persuaded him to open the Greenwich Gallery. The inaugural show, understandably, had paintings by Coughtry and Snow. The gallery was renamed the Isaacs Gallery in 1959 and moved to a new location at 832 Yonge Street in 1961. In it he represented numerous Canadian artists, including Coughtry, Snow, William Kurelek, Gordon Rayner, Jack Chambers, Joyce Wieland, Mark Prent, Richard Gorman, John Meredith, Dennis Burton, Robert Markle, Gathie Falk and Christiane Pflug, many of whom stayed with the gallery for all or most of their careers. The Isaacs Gallery was noted for the broad range of work it showed, running from contemporary art to the art of New Guinea and west-coast Indian artists and even to Asian costumes but his efforts went beyond helping his artists and their markets, wrote the Globe and Mail in 2005. Isaacs also was famous for his "young talent" shows. The Art Gallery of Ontario described him in 2016 as both curator and agitator, challenging both his artists and the community to be progressive. He was more than just an art dealer, he was a champion for modern Canadian art and Toronto.

He opened the Innuit Gallery in Toronto in 1970, where he gave solo exhibitions to such distinguished artists as Karoo Ashevak and Jessie Oonark. In August 1991 Isaacs consolidated his two galleries to form the Isaacs/Innuit Gallery. The gallery closed in 2001.

He was awarded an honorary doctorate by York University in 1992, and was made a Member of the Order of Canada. Av Isaacs died on January 15, 2016. He was 89 years old.

== Legacy ==
The key role of the Isaacs Gallery and the artists associated with Av Isaacs was revisited in a joint exhibition titled Isaacs Seen at the University of Toronto Art Centre, Hart House, the Art Gallery of Ontario (AGO), and the Textile Museum of Canada (2003-2005). In 2016, the AGO did a second show about Isaacs, Av Isaacs: Shaping the Scene which exhibited 19 works from the AGO's collection, donated by Av Isaacs or acquired from the Isaacs and Innuit Galleries through purchase and from local collectors.

== Bibliography ==
- Wigmore, Donnalu (compiler) (2005). Isaacs Seen: 50 Years On The Art Front: A Gallery Scrapbook. Toronto: University of Toronto Art Centre, Textile Museum of Canada and the Art Gallery of Ontario. ISBN 9780969438267. OCLC 58729238.
