= Jack Bush =

Canadian artist (1909–1977)

Jack Bush OC RCA
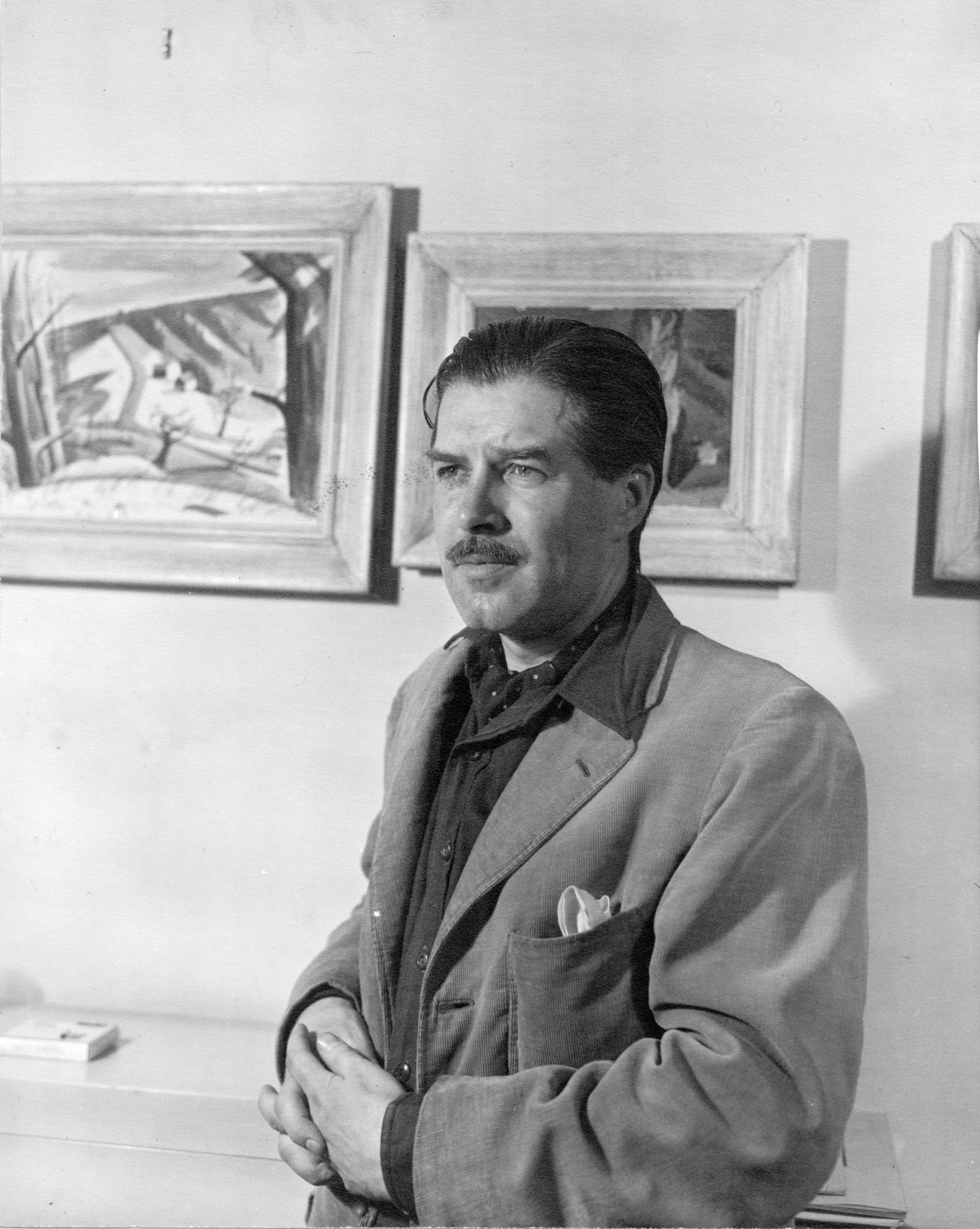
- Portrait of Jack Bush, 1946
- Born: March 20, 1909; Toronto, Ontario, Canada
- Died: January 24, 1977 (aged 67); Toronto, Ontario, Canada
- Known for: Abstract Expressionist
- Movement: Painters Eleven, Abstract Expressionism, Color Field painting, Lyrical Abstraction
- Spouse: Mabel Mills Teakle
- Children: Terry Bush, Charles Robert Bush, Jack Bush Jr.

Jack Hamilton Bush OC RCA (March 20, 1909 – January 24, 1977) was a Canadian abstract painter. A member of Painters Eleven, his paintings are associated with the Colour Field movement and Post-painterly Abstraction. Inspired by Henri Matisse and American abstract expressionist painters such as Helen Frankenthaler and Morris Louis, Bush encapsulated joyful yet emotional feelings in his vibrant paintings, comparing them to jazz music. Clement Greenberg described him as a "supreme colorist", along with Kenneth Noland in 1984. Bush explained that capturing the feeling of a subject rather than its likeness was

a hard step for the art loving public to take, not to have the red look like a side of a barn but to let it be the red for its own sake and how it exists in the environment of that canvas.

== Early life and commercial work ==
Bush was born in Toronto, Ontario. As a young man, he attended the Royal Canadian Academy school in Montreal, Quebec, where he studied with Adam Sheriff Scott and Edmond Dyonnet.

In his early stages, Bush was influenced by the work of Charles Comfort and the Group of Seven. He began his professional career as a landscape artist and focused on painting them. He also attended Charles Comfort's weekly life model drawing sessions, hosted in Comfort's studio in Toronto. During the 1940s, he worked as one of the principals at the commercial art business of Wookie, Bush and Winter, founded in 1942, and, by night, furthered his studies at the Ontario College of Art. In his early work, Bush, like other Canadian artists of the time, was sheltered from major European influences. For 41 years he was a commercial artist, retiring in 1968, years after he had achieved success as an abstract artist.

Bush, Big A, acrylic on canvas, 1968

== Painters Eleven and after ==
Bush developed his work and approach to abstraction through the 1950s. He was a member of Painters Eleven, an influential group founded by William Ronald in 1954 to promote abstract painting in Canada and was soon encouraged in his art by the American art critic Clement Greenberg. Critical at first, Greenberg became a mentor to Bush and encouraged him to refine his palette, technique, and approach. He told Bush to seek in his oil painting the thinness and clarity of colour and the simplicity of his works on paper. As a result of Greenberg's guidance, Bush became closely tied with Color Field Painting and Lyrical Abstraction. Bush's work is based on an abstract record of his perception. Rather than expecting the audience to recognize his subject or experience the use of forms in his paintings, he shares the emotion of that experience by slabs and streaks of color. Bush became friends with artists associated with colour-field like Jules Olitski, Kenneth Noland and Anthony Caro. As Painters Eleven disbanded in 1960, Bush moved on, and in the end became one of the most successful artists to come from this group.

In 1962, he had his first solo exhibition in New York City on Madison Avenue, and from that point on his career as a major abstract painter began. In 1964, he decided to stop having solo shows in Toronto because he felt that art scene abroad would see him as provincial and he needed to concentrate on establishing a reputation outside of Canada.

Bush permanently switched from using oil paint which he had used for forty years, thinned with turpentine in his large abstract work to allow the pigment to be absorbed by the unprimed canvas, to water-based acrylic paints in March 1966. He represented Canada at the 1967 São Paulo Art Biennial, and in 1976 the Art Gallery of Ontario toured a large retrospective of his work. He died in Toronto at the age of 67 on 24 January 1977. In 1979, two years later, the National Film Board of Canada released a one-hour documentary Jack Bush, directed by Murray Battle.

== Influences ==
One of his most important influences was Henri Matisse (1869–1954), a French artist who led the Fauvist movement about 1900 by pursuing expressive color throughout his career.

Bush once said to his peer and friend Kenneth Noland:

What I'd really like to do is hit Matisse's ball out of the park.

and Noland replied:

Go ahead, Matisse won't mind at all.

== Honours ==
- Guggenheim Fellowship, 1968
- The Order of Canada, January 1976
- Royal Canadian Academy of Arts
- Canada Post honoured Jack Bush with a Canadian postage stamp and a souvenir sheet released on March 20, 2009. The stamps featured his 1964 painting, Striped Column and his 1977 painting Chopsticks.

== Selected collections ==
- National Gallery of Canada, Ottawa;
- Art Gallery of Ontario, Toronto;
- Montreal Museum of Fine Arts;
- Museum of Fine Arts, Boston;
- Tate Gallery, London;
- Masterworks Museum of Bermuda Art;
- Boca Raton Museum of Art, Florida;

== Personal life ==
Bush's son Terry is a jingle writer, best known for singing and co-writing "Maybe Tomorrow", the theme for The Littlest Hobo.

== Bibliography and filmography ==
- Boyanoski, Christine. Jack Bush: Early Work [exhibition catalogue]. Toronto: Art Gallery of Ontario, 1985.
- Carpenter, Ken. The Heritage of Jack Bush: A Tribute. Oshawa, Ont.: Robert McLaughlin Gallery, 1981.
- Jack Bush, Paintings & Drawings, 1955-1976 [exhibition catalogue]. London: Arts Council of Great Britain, 1980.
- Jack Bush [exhibition catalogue]. Boston: Museum of Fine Arts, 1972.
- Mayer, Marc and Stanners, Sarah. Jack Bush [exhibition catalogue]. Ottawa: National Gallery of Canada, 2014.
- Stanners, Sarah (2024). Jack Bush Paintings: A Catalogue Raisonné. Toronto: David Mirvish Books and Coach House Press, Toronto. ISBN 1738955702.
- Wilkin, Karen (ed.). Jack Bush. Toronto: McClelland & Stewart, 1984.
- "Jack Bush", documentary director Murray Battle, producer Rudy Buttignol (Cinema Productions for the National Film Board of Canada, 1979) 56 minutes.
